= Pudding (disambiguation) =

Pudding is a dessert or a savory dish.

Pudding may also refer to:

== Food ==
- Dessert generally, a usage seen in the United Kingdom and some other Commonwealth countries

=== Dessert puddings ===
- Banana pudding
- Bread pudding
- Bread and butter pudding
- Butterscotch, pudding
- Cabinet pudding
- Chocolate pudding
- Christmas pudding
  - Plum pudding
- Clootie dumpling
- Cottage pudding
- Figgy duff (pudding)
- Figgy pudding
- Fruit pudding
- Hasty pudding
- Indian pudding
- Instant pudding
- Jell-O Pudding, a dessert
- Lemon delicious pudding
- Mango pudding
- Persimmon pudding
- Pistachio pudding
- Pudding Pops, frosty ice pop treats originally made and marketed by Jell-O
- Rice pudding
- Sago pudding
- Sticky toffee pudding
- Summer pudding
- Sussex pond pudding
- Sweet potato, pudding
- Tapioca pudding
- Treacle sponge pudding
- Vanilla pudding, flavored blancmange

=== Savory puddings ===
- Black pudding
- Cheese pudding
- Corn pudding
- Groaty pudding
- Liver pudding (liver mush)
- Moin moin, a Nigerian steamed bean pudding
- Pease pudding
- Red pudding
- Steak and kidney pudding
- Tavuk göğsü, a Turkish milk pudding made with shredded chicken
- White pudding
- Yorkshire pudding

=== Other puddings ===
- List of puddings, sweet and savory
- Semolina pudding, or semolina porridge, a porridge-type pudding

== Places ==
- Pudding Butte, Oates Land, Antarctica
- Pudding Lane, a street in London
- Pudding Mill Lane DLR station
- Pudding River, Oregon, a tributary of the Molalla River

== Other uses ==
- Pudding, a recurring character from the Space Channel 5 video game series
- Pudding cloth, a reusable culinary utensil, similar to a cheesecloth or muslin, used for boiling a wide range of puddings
- Pudding Shop, the nickname for the Lale Restaurant in Sultanahmet, Istanbul, Turkey
- Plum pudding model, one of several scientific models of the atom
- "The proof of the pudding, is in the eating", a proverb widely attributed to the Spanish author Miguel de Cervantes in his novel The Ingenious Gentleman Don Quixote

== See also ==
- Pudd'nhead Wilson
- Puddingstone (rock)
- Puddingstone Reservoir
- Puddingwife wrasse
