= Suet pudding =

Pudding made with wheat flour and suet

- Type: Pudding
- Place of origin: United Kingdom
- Main ingredients: Wheat flour and Suet
- Variations: Spotted dick, Christmas pudding, Treacle pudding, Clootie dumpling, Jam Roly-Poly, Paignton, Sussex pond pudding

A suet pudding is a boiled, steamed or baked pudding made with wheat flour and suet (raw, hard fat of beef or mutton found around the kidneys). It often contains breadcrumbs, dried fruits such as raisins, other preserved fruits, and spices. The British term "pudding" usually refers to a dessert or sweet course, but suet puddings may be savoury.

Many variations are strongly associated with British cuisine. Recipes vary greatly and can be desserts or savoury courses. They are typically boiled or steamed, though some baked variations and recipes adapted for microwave ovens exist. Modern recipes may substitute butter or vegetable shortening for the eponymous suet.

Examples include spotted dick, Christmas pudding, treacle pudding, clootie dumpling, jam roly-poly and many others. Savoury versions include rabbit, chicken, game and steak and kidney pudding.

The Sussex pond pudding and the Paignton pudding are local variations of suet puddings.

== History ==
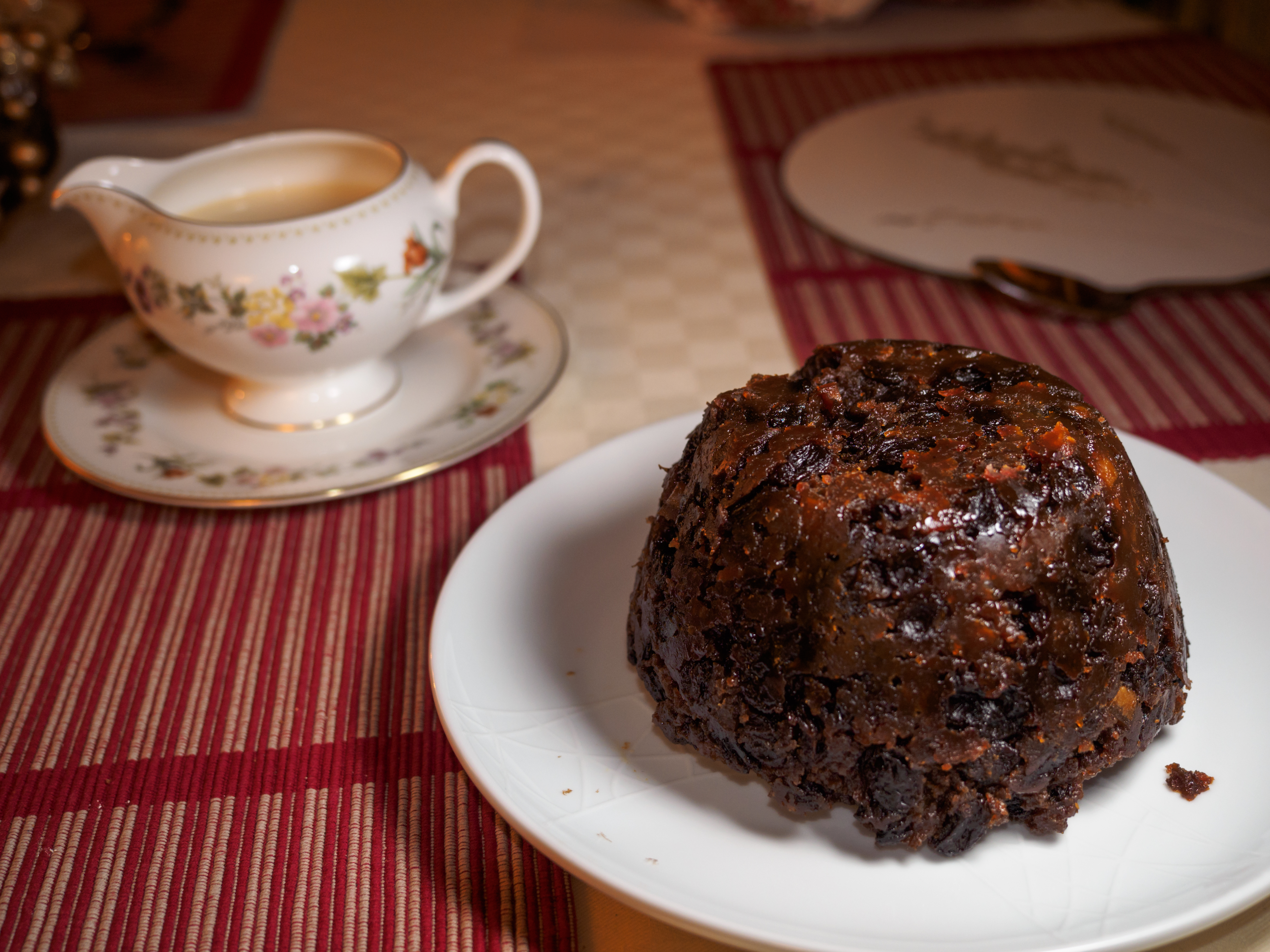
Christmas pudding, a type of suet pudding

The suet pudding dates back to at least the start of the 18th century. Mary Kettilby's 1714 A Collection of above Three Hundred Receipts in Cookery, Physick and Surgery gives a recipe for "An excellent Plumb-Pudding", which calls for "one pound of Suet, shred very small and sifted" along with raisins, flour, sugar, eggs, and a little salt; these were to be boiled for "four hours at least".

Christmas pudding developed from a meat dish. The ancestor of the suet pudding was pottage, a meat and vegetable stew originating in Roman times. This was prepared in a large cauldron, the ingredients being slow cooked, with dried fruits, sugar and spices added. In the 15th century, plum pottage was a mixture of meat, vegetables and fruit served at the beginning of a meal.

The name suet pudding refers to the fat mixed with the flour; it is the fat from around the kidneys of mammals. Pudding is a British term often used for steamed dishes, both sweet and savoury, but also for Yorkshire Pudding (a batter dish) and Bread and Butter Pudding (a custard dessert).

== Advantages ==
Suet has a melting point of between 45 and 50 °C (113 and 122 °F). Butter, by comparison, melts between 32 and 35 °C (90 and 95 °F). As a result, suet fat is less likely to melt into the flour when making the pastry. When the pudding is cooked, the suet melts after the pastry has had a chance to set, leaving behind holes. This structure allows the pastry to better stand up to wet fillings and gives a lighter, fluffier texture.

== Cultural references ==
George Orwell wrote of the position of suet in English society. He stated in his 1947 essay "Such, Such Were the Joys," that in the late Victorian era, St Cyprian's School, his preparatory school, had reportedly saved money by starting off boarders' dinners

"...with a slab of unsweetened suet pudding, which, it was frankly said, ‘broke the boys appetites.’"

In his 1941 essay "England Your England" Orwell recounted,

"In left-wing circles it is always felt that there is something slightly disgraceful in being an Englishman and that it is a duty to snigger at every English institution, from horse racing to suet puddings."

== See also ==
- English cuisine
- List of steamed foods
