= Poutchine au sac =

Métis bag pudding

- Main ingredients: Beef suet, flour, brown sugar, raisins, Zante currant, milk

Poutchine au sac (lit. 'pudding in a bag') is a Métis bag pudding dish made of beef suet, flour, brown sugar, raisins, currants, and milk. The ingredients are combined in a cotton bag or sealer jars, then steamed. The cooked dish is usually topped with a sauce made from sugar, cornstarch, vanilla, and nutmeg.

== See also ==
- Figgy duff (pudding), a bag pudding from Newfoundland
- Clootie dumpling, a similar Scottish traditional pudding
