= Upside-down cake =

Type of cake

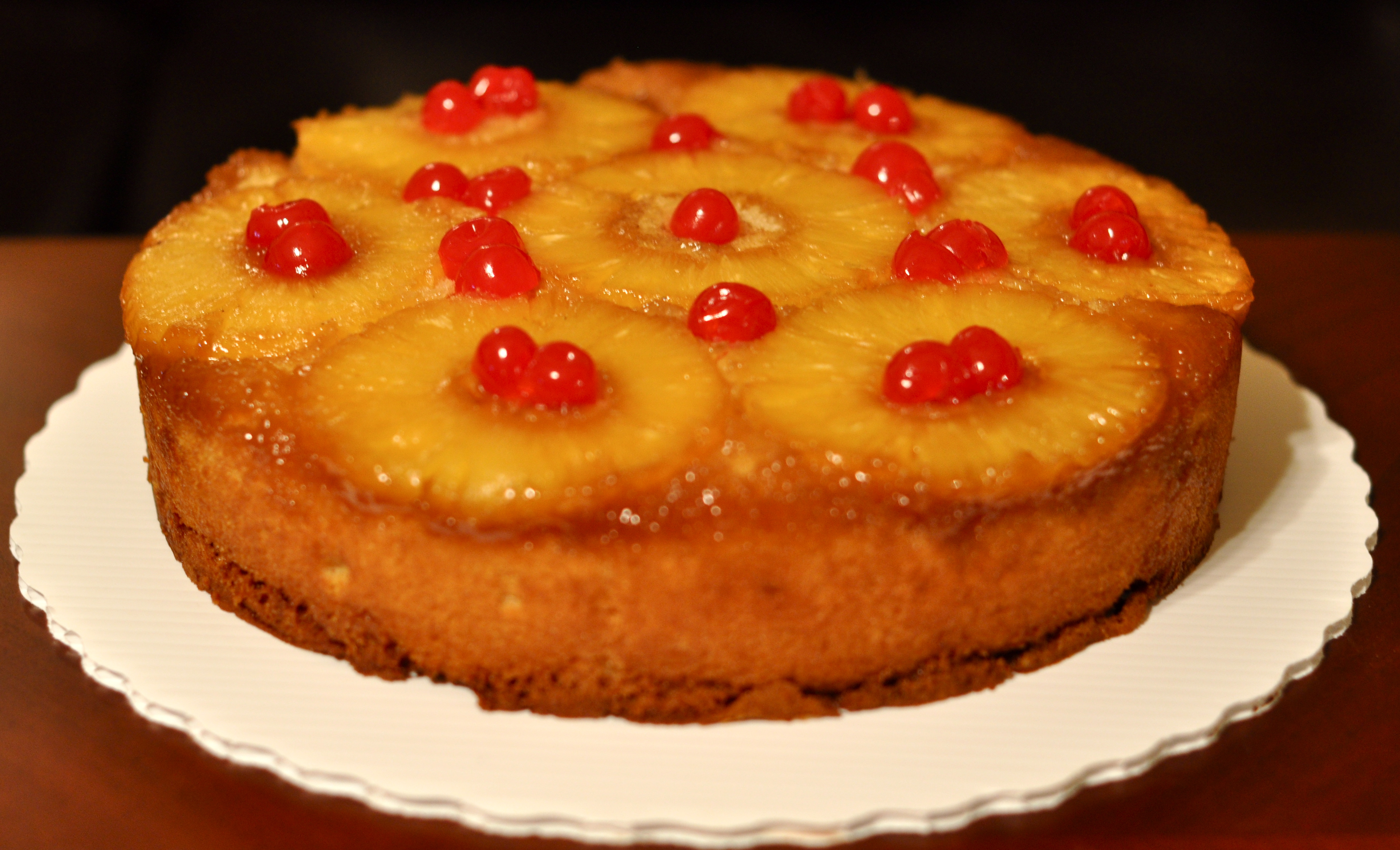
- Pineapple upside-down cake
- Type: Cake
- Main ingredients: Batter, fruit (apples, pineapples, cherries)

An upside-down cake is a cake that is baked "upside-down" in a single pan, with its toppings at the bottom of the pan. When it is removed from the oven, the finished upside-down preparation is turned over and de-panned onto a serving plate, thus flipping it and serving it right-side up.

== Recipe ==
An upside-down cake is a cake that is baked "upside-down" in a single pan—usually a skillet—with the eventual toppings placed in the bottom of the pan. When removed from the oven, the finished upside-down preparation is flipped over and de-panned onto a serving plate. Flipping the cake before serving puts the right-side up, so that the ingredients that were in the bottom of the pan are the toppings. Usually chopped or sliced fruits—such as apples, cherries, peaches, or pineapples—butter, and sugar are placed on the bottom of the pan before the batter is poured in, so that they form a baked-on topping after the cake is inverted. A simple cottage pudding cake batter may be used.

== History ==
Traditional upside-down preparations include the American pineapple upside-down cake, the French Tarte Tatin, and the Brazilian or Portuguese bolo de ananás (also known as bolo de abacaxi).

In the United States, the popularity of pineapple upside down cakes increased in the mid-1920s after Dole Pineapple Company sponsored a contest for pineapple recipes. They received over 2,500 various submissions for the inverted pineapple cake and ran an advertisement about it.

== Gallery ==
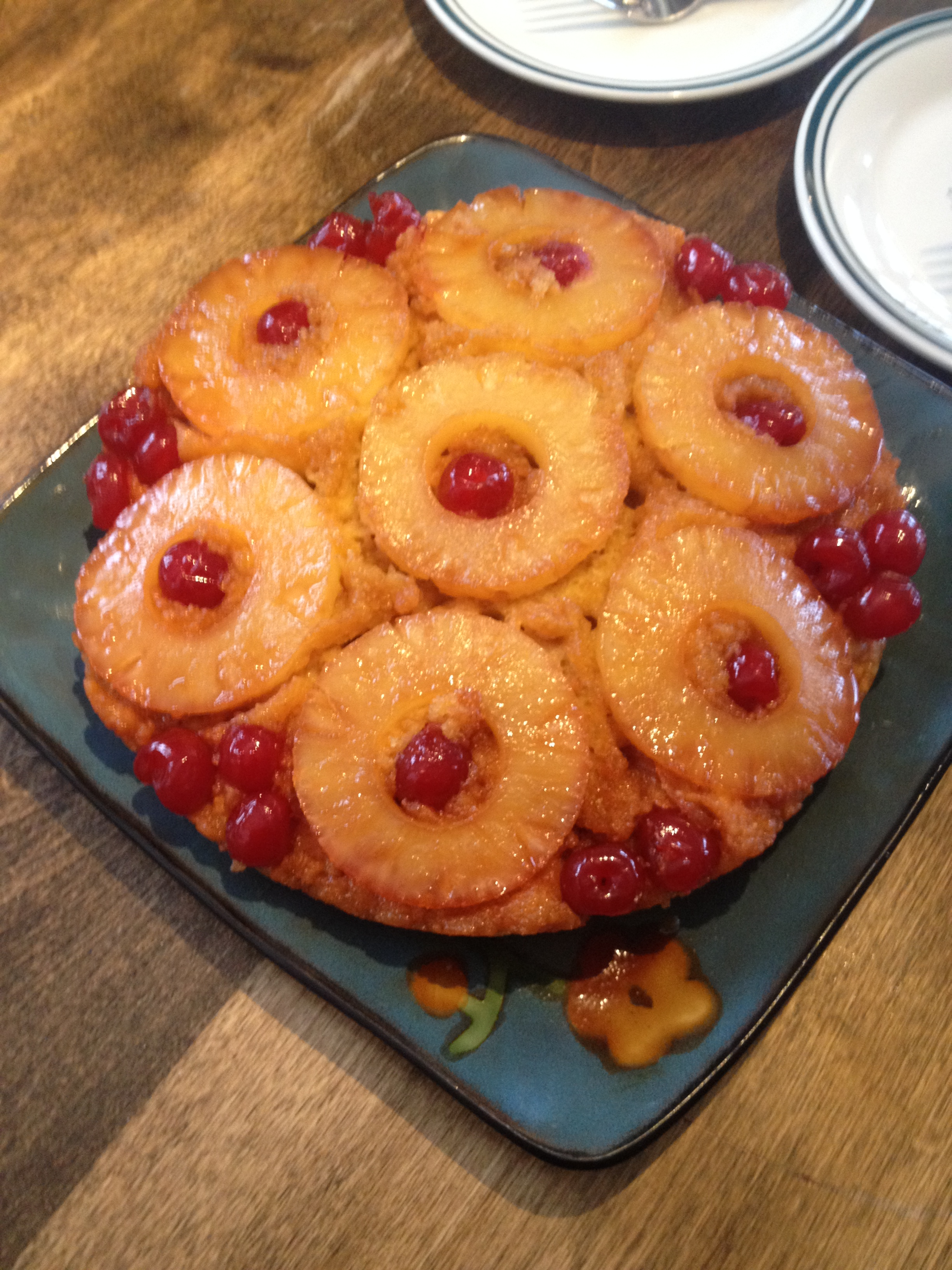
American pineapple upside-down cake

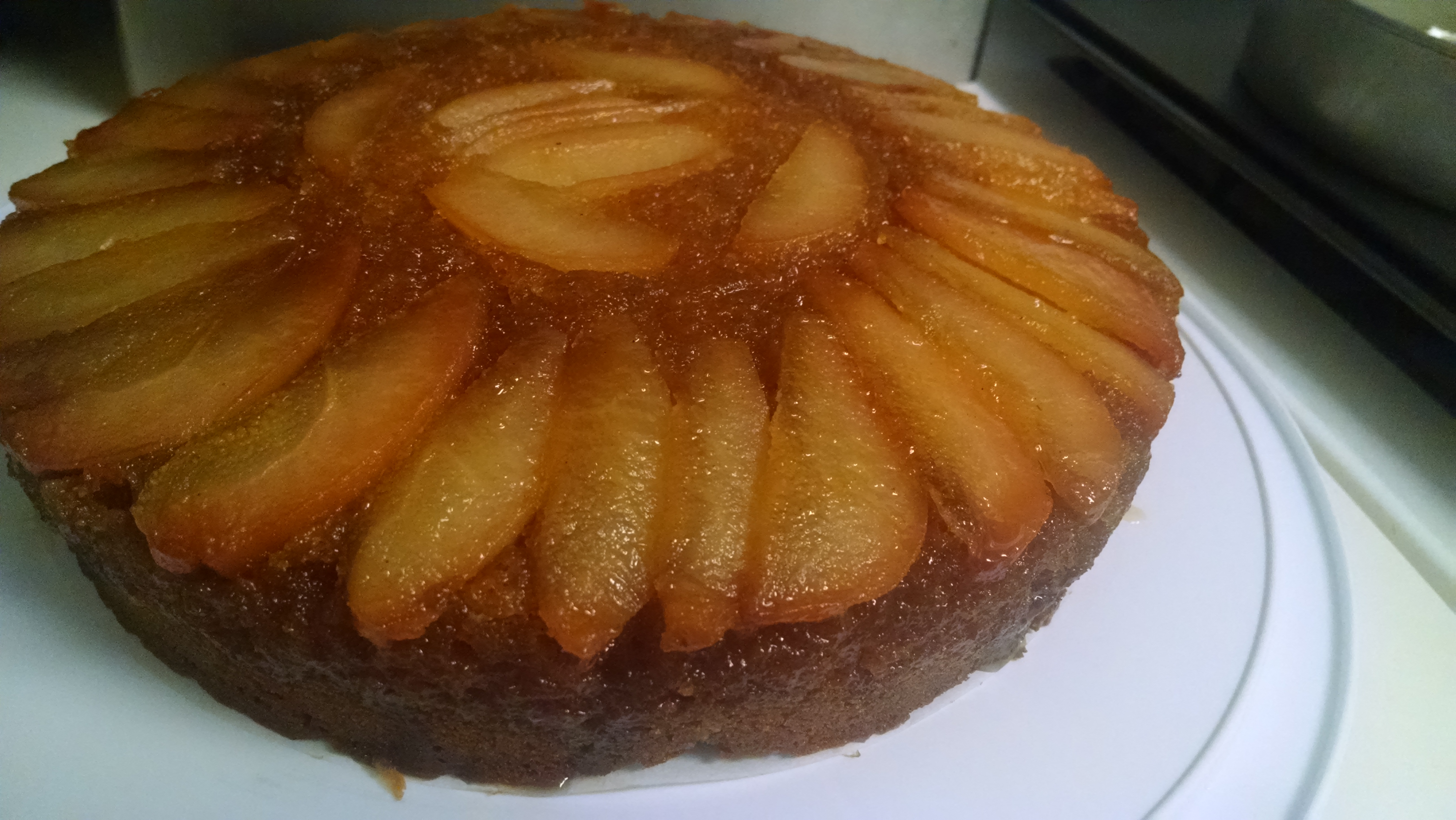
Pear upside-down cake

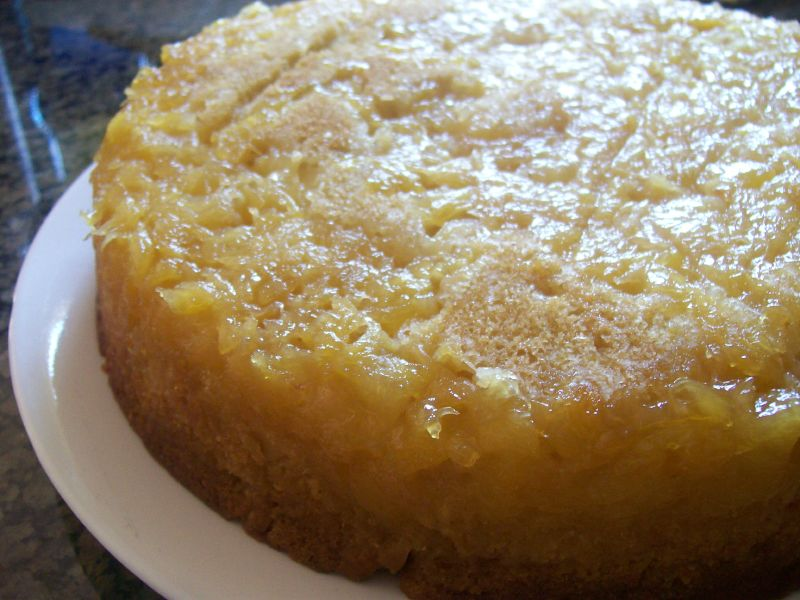
Crushed pineapple upside-down cake

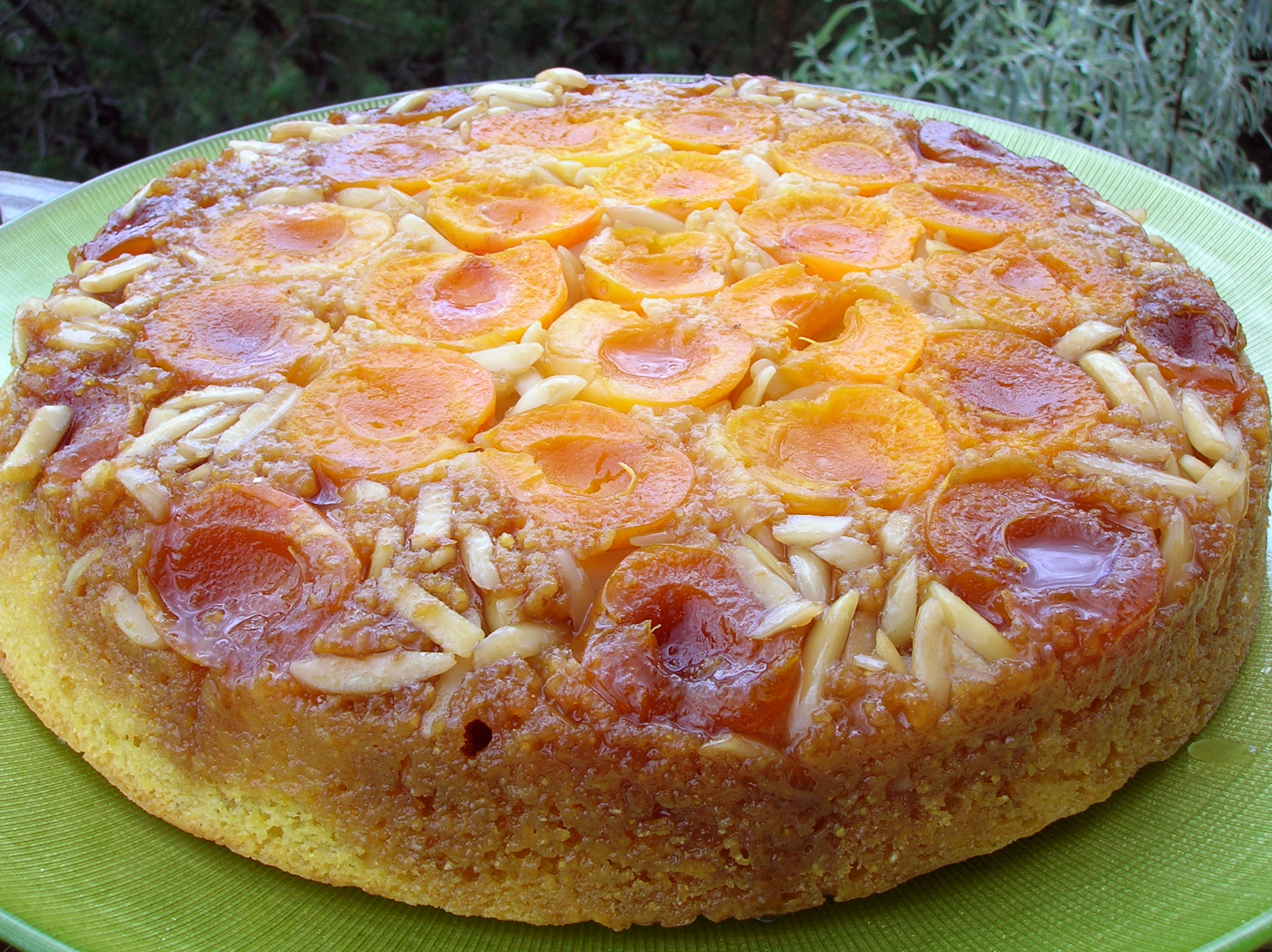
Apricot and cornmeal

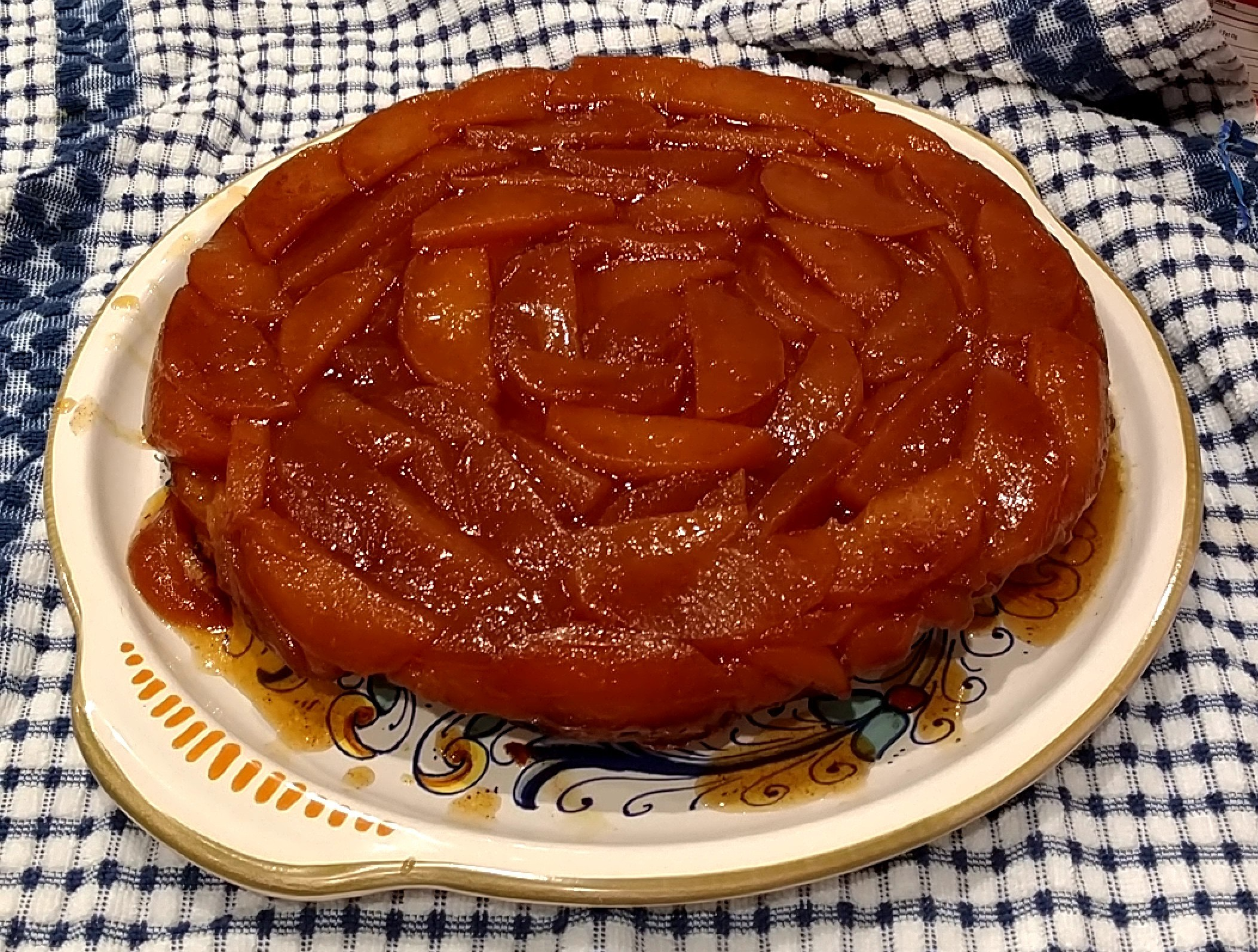
Tarte tatin

== See also ==
- Pineapple cake
