= Spotted dick =

Traditional British dessert

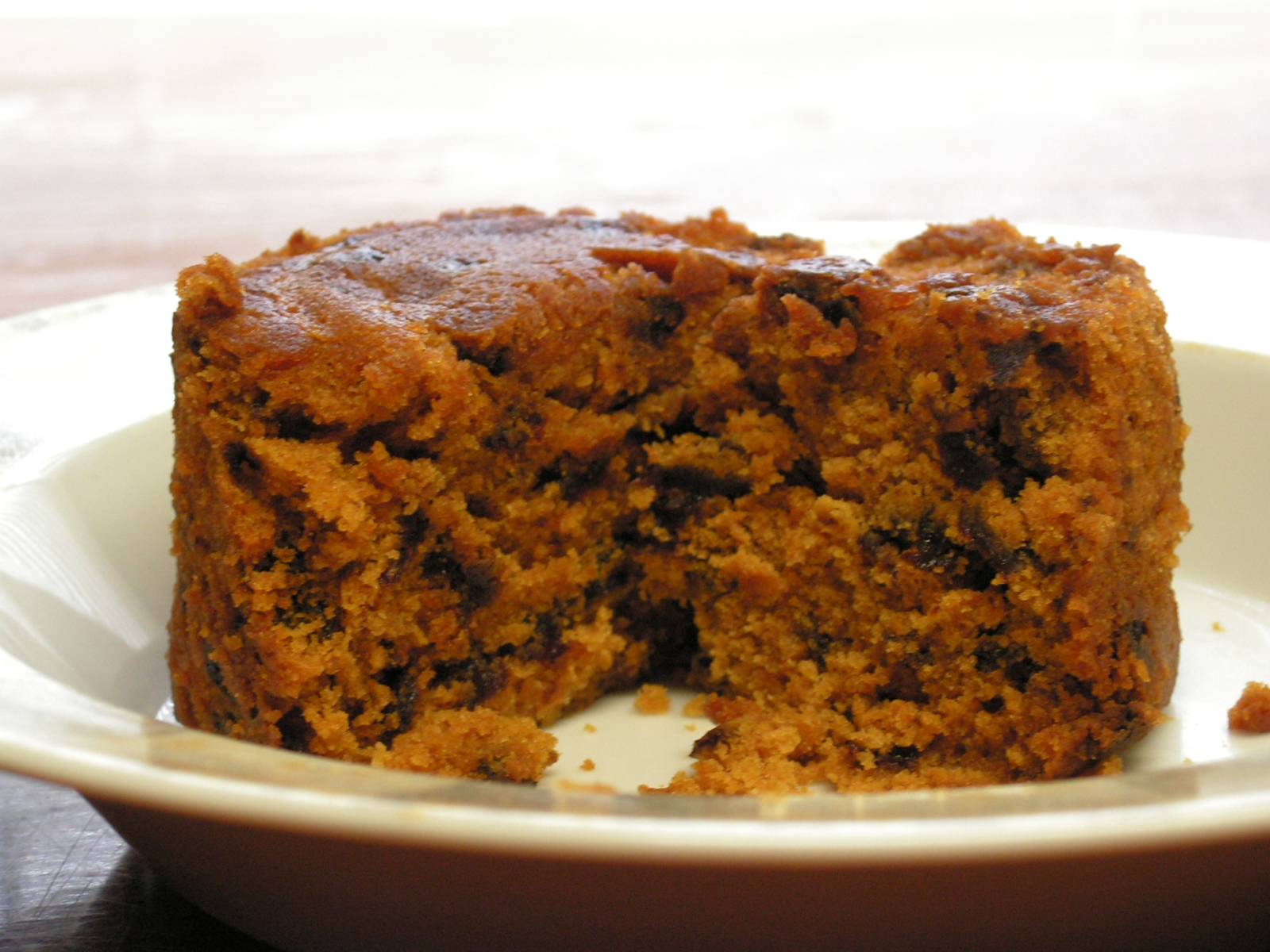
- Type: Pudding
- Place of origin: United Kingdom
- Main ingredients: Suet, dried fruit, flour, sugar, milk, baking powder

Spotted dick is a traditional British steamed pudding, historically made with suet and dried fruit (usually currants or raisins) and often served with custard.

Non-traditional variants include recipes that replace suet with other fats (such as butter), or that include eggs to make something similar to a sponge pudding or cake.

== Etymology ==
Spotted is a reference to the dried fruit in the pudding (which resembles spots). The word dick refers to pudding. In late 19th century Huddersfield, for instance, a glossary of local terms stated: "Dick, plain pudding. If with treacle sauce, treacle dick." This sense of dick may be related to the word dough. In the variant name spotted dog, dog is a variant form of dough.

== History ==
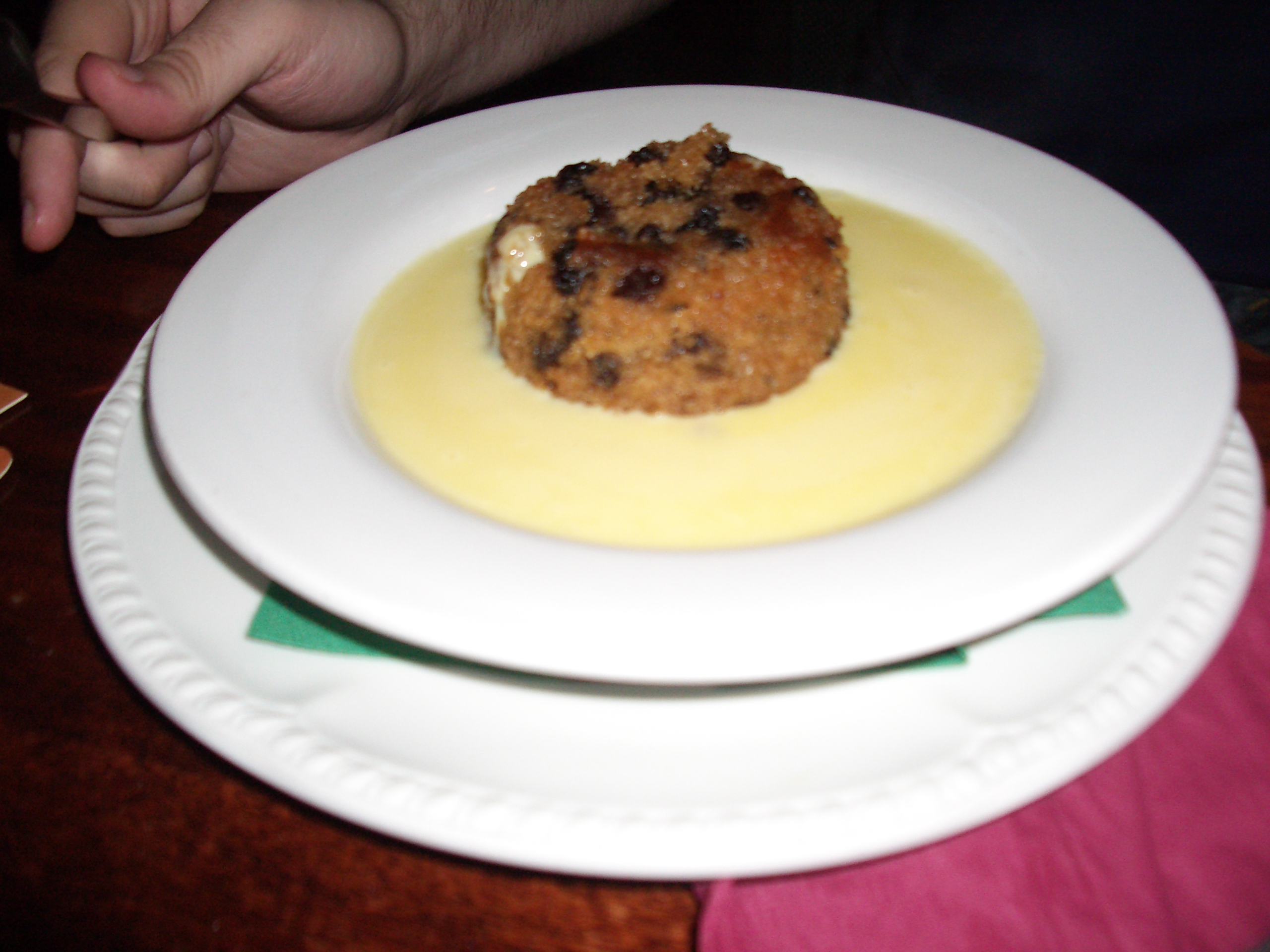
Spotted dick and custard

The dish is first attested in Alexis Soyer's The Modern Housewife or, Ménagère, published in 1849, in which he described a recipe for "Plum Bolster, or Spotted Dick – Roll out two pounds of paste [...] have some Smyrna raisins well washed".

The name "spotted dog" first appeared in 1855, in C.M. Smith's "Working-men's Way in the World" where it was described as a "very marly species of plum-pudding". This name, along with "railway cake", is most common in Ireland where it is made more similar to a soda bread loaf with the addition of currants.

The Pall Mall Gazette reported in 1892 that "the Kilburn Sisters [...] daily satisfied hundreds of dockers with soup and Spotted Dick".

== See also ==
- Clootie dumpling, a similar Scottish traditional pudding
- Figgy duff, a bag pudding from Newfoundland
- List of fruit dishes
- List of steamed foods
- Poutchine au sac, Métis bag pudding from Western Canada
