= Figgy duff (pudding) =

Newfoundland and Labradorer traditional bag pudding

- Type: Pudding
- Place of origin: Newfoundland and Labrador
- Region or state: North America
- Associated cuisine: Canadian cuisine
- Main ingredients: Flour, butter, sugar, molasses, raisins
- Food energy (per serving): 733 kcal (3,070 kJ)

Figgy duff is a traditional bag pudding from the province of Newfoundland and Labrador, most commonly served as a part of a Jiggs dinner. It is sometimes called a raisin duff. The word 'Figgy' (or figgie) is an old Cornish term for raisin; perhaps indicating the origin of the settlers who brought this dish to the area. It is very similar to the Scottish clootie dumpling.

One traditional recipe lists the ingredients as breadcrumbs, raisins, brown sugar, molasses, butter, flour, and spices. These are mixed and put in a pudding bag, wrapped in cheesecloth, or stuffed into an empty can and then boiled, usually along with the cooking vegetables of the Jiggs dinner.

== See also ==
- Poutchine au sac, Métis bag pudding from Western Canada
- Clootie dumpling, very similar Scottish Traditional Pudding
- Spotted dick, similar British raisin pudding
- Figgy pudding
- Duff, similar Bahamian dessert usually made with guava fruit
