= Pudding =

Dessert or savory dish

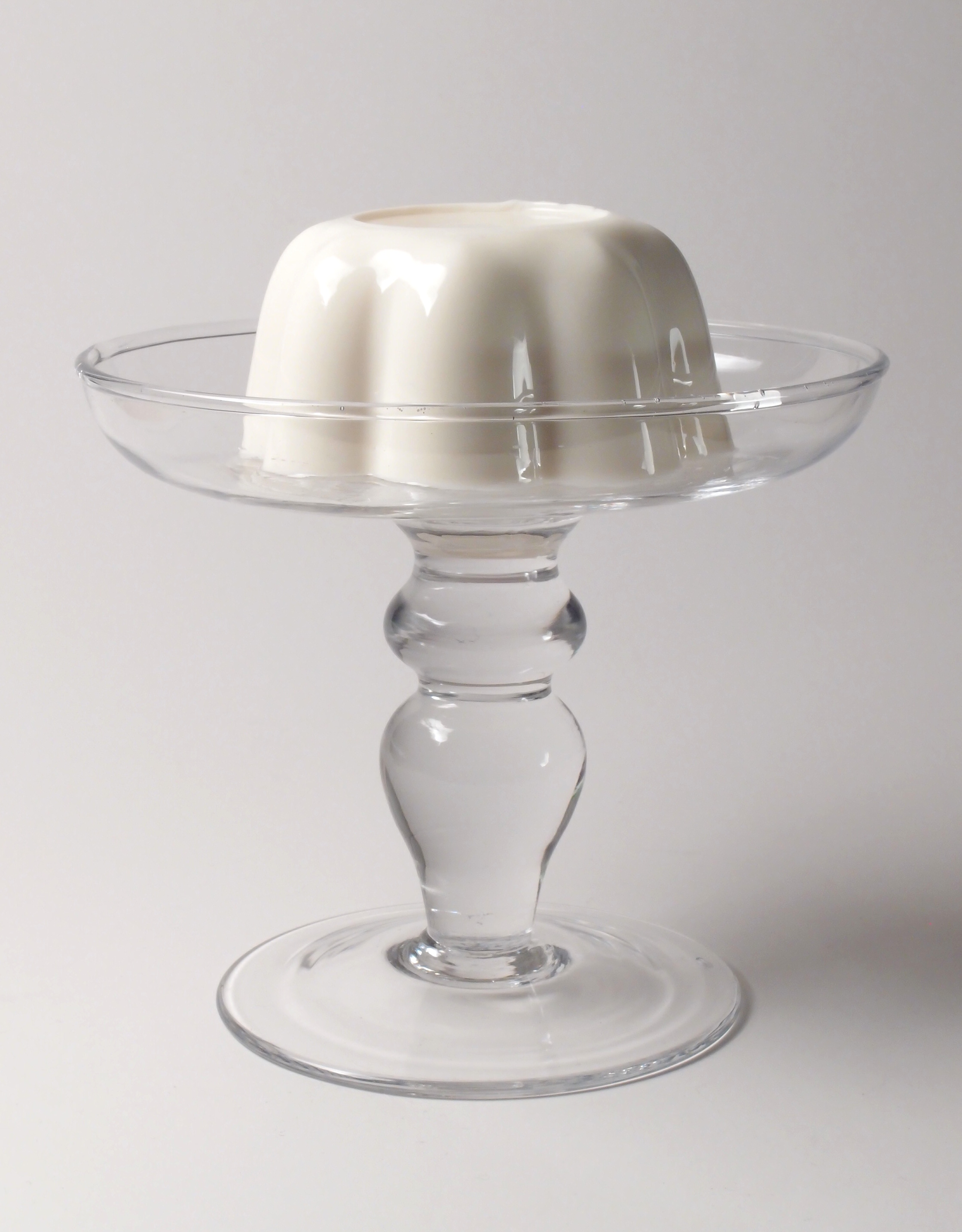
- Blancmange from France
- Type: Pudding

Pudding is a food that can either be a dessert or a savoury dish. In the United States, pudding means a sweet, milk-based dessert similar in consistency to egg-based custards, instant custards or a mousse, often set using cornstarch, gelatin or similar coagulating agent. These puddings are known in some Commonwealth countries as custards (or curds) if they are egg-thickened, as blancmange if starch-thickened, and as jelly if gelatin-based. Pudding in America may also refer to other dishes such as bread pudding and rice pudding, although typically these names derive from their origin as British dishes. The modern American meaning of pudding as dessert has evolved from the original almost exclusive use of the term to describe savoury dishes, specifically those created using a process similar to that used for sausages, in which meat and other ingredients in mostly liquid form are encased and then steamed or boiled to set the contents.

In the United Kingdom, Ireland and some Commonwealth countries, the word pudding is used to describe both sweet and savoury dishes. Savoury puddings include Yorkshire pudding, black pudding, suet pudding and steak and kidney pudding. Sweet puddings include bread pudding, sticky toffee pudding, tapioca pudding, and rice pudding. Unless qualified, however, pudding usually means dessert and in the United Kingdom, pudding is used as a synonym for dessert. Puddings made for dessert can be boiled and steamed puddings, baked puddings, bread puddings, batter puddings, milk puddings or jellies.

== Etymology ==
The word pudding is believed to come from the French boudin, which may derive from the Latin botellus, meaning "small sausage", referring to encased meats used in medieval European puddings. Another proposed etymology is from the West German pud, meaning 'to swell'.

According to the Oxford English Dictionary the word pudding dates to the 13th century. It refers to the entrails or stomach of a sheep, pig or other animal stuffed with meat, offal, suet, oatmeal and seasonings. By the 1500s, the word was used to refer to the guts or entrails or the contents of other people's stomachs especially when pierced with a sword, as in battle. The Oxford English Dictionary describes puddings also as 'a boiled, steamed or baked dish made with various sweet (or sometimes) savoury ingredients added to the mixture, typically including milk, eggs, and flour (or other starchy ingredients such as suet, rice, semolina, etc.), enclosed within a crust made from such a mixture'.

== Savoury and sweet ==
=== Savoury puddings ===
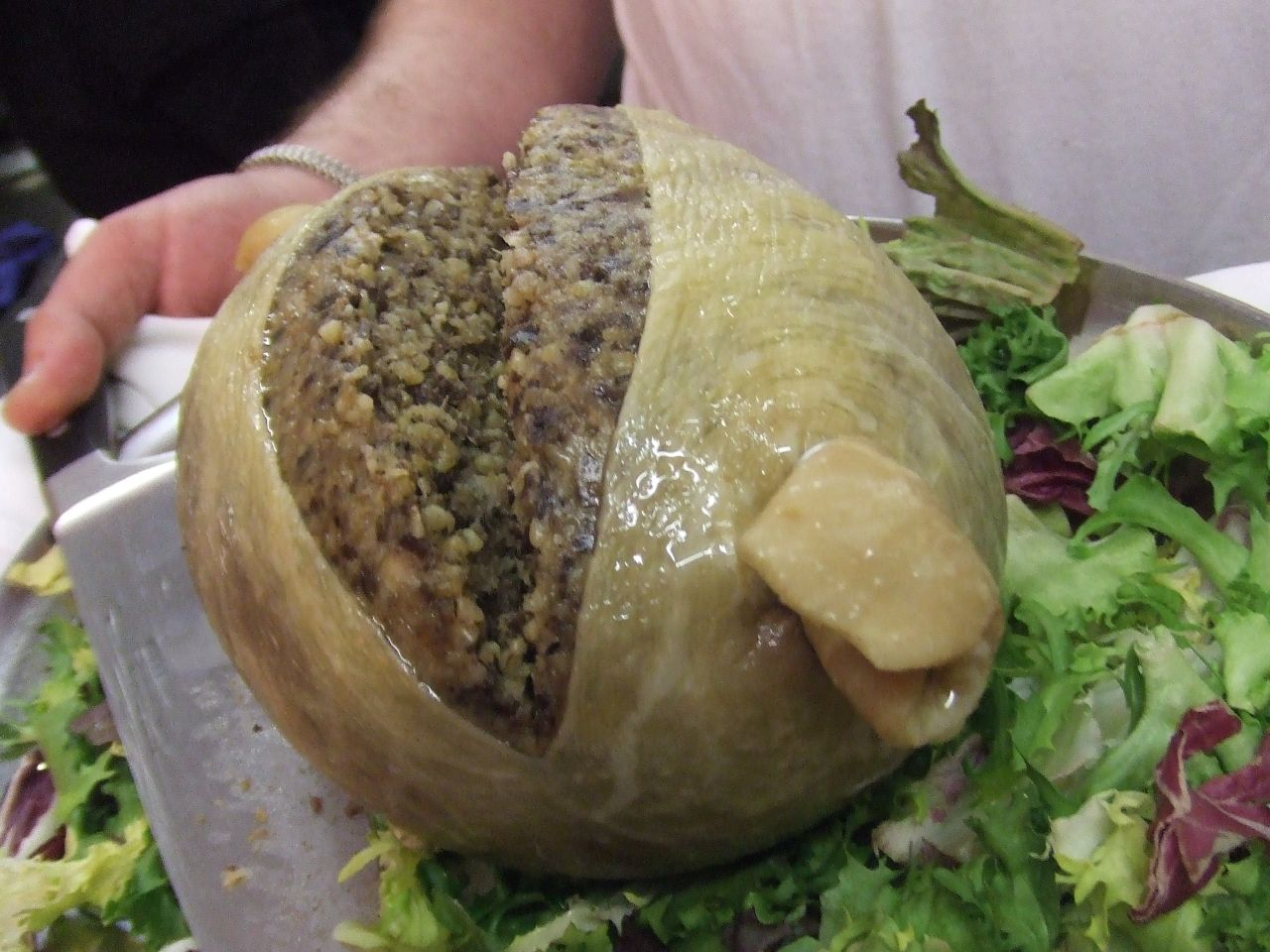
Haggis, a savoury pudding

The modern usage of the word pudding to mean a dessert has evolved from the almost exclusive use of the term to describe a savoury dish, specifically those created using a process similar to sausages, where meat and other ingredients in a mostly liquid form are encased and then steamed or boiled to set the contents. The most famous examples still surviving are black pudding and haggis. Other savoury dishes include steak and kidney pudding and some kinds of suet pudding. Boiled or steamed pudding was a common main course aboard ships in the Royal Navy during the 18th and 19th centuries; pudding was used as the primary dish in which daily rations of flour and suet were employed.

=== Dessert puddings ===
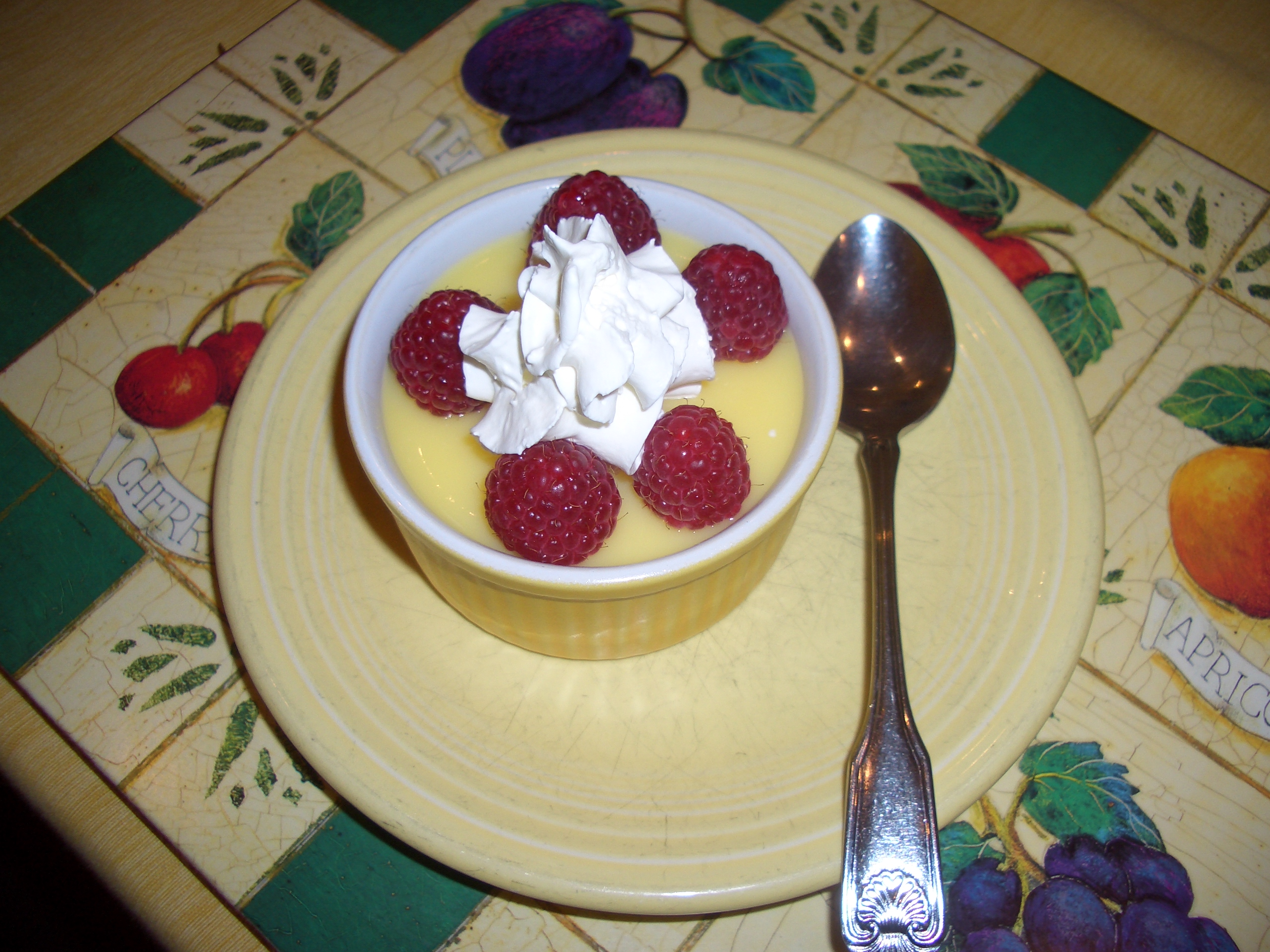
Pudding of the dessert type may be served with toppings such as fresh fruit and whipped cream.

Commonwealth dessert puddings are rich, fairly homogeneous starch- or dairy-based desserts such as rice pudding or steamed cake mixtures such as treacle sponge pudding (with or without the addition of ingredients such as dried fruits as in a Christmas pudding).

In the United States and some parts of Canada, pudding characteristically denotes a sweet milk-based dessert similar in consistency to egg-based custards, instant custards or a mousse, often commercially set using cornstarch, tapioca, gelatin, or similar coagulating agent. In Commonwealth countries (other than some Canadian regions), these foods are known as custards (or curds) if they are egg-thickened, blancmange if starch-thickened, and jelly if gelatin-based. Pudding may also refer to other dishes such as bread pudding and rice pudding in North America, although typically these names derive from their origin as British dishes.

== History ==
One of the first documented mentions of pudding can be found in Homer's Odyssey where a blood pudding roasted in a pig's stomach is described. This original meaning of a pudding as a sausage is retained in black pudding, which is a blood sausage originating in the United Kingdom and Ireland made from pork or beef blood, with pork fat or beef suet, and a cereal.

Another early documented recipe for pudding is a reference to asida is found in a 10th-century Arabic cookbook by Ibn Sayyar al-Warraq called Kitab al-Ṭabīḫ (Arabic: كتاب الطبيخ, The Book of Dishes). It was described as a thick pudding of dates cooked with clarified butter (samn). A recipe for asida was also mentioned in an anonymous Hispano-Muslim cookbook dating to the 13th century. In the 13th and 14th centuries, in the mountainous region of the Rif along the Mediterranean coast of Morocco, flour made from lightly grilled barley was used in place of wheat flour. A recipe for asida that adds argan seed oil was documented by Leo Africanus (c. 1465–1550), the Arab explorer known as Hasan al-Wazan in the Arab world. According to the French scholar Maxime Rodinson, asida were typical foods among the Bedouin of pre-Islamic and, probably, later times.

In the United Kingdom and some of the Commonwealth countries, the word pudding can be used to describe both sweet and savoury dishes. Unless qualified, however, the term in everyday usage typically denotes a dessert; in the United Kingdom, pudding is used as a synonym for a dessert course.

Puddings had their 'real heyday...', according to food historian Annie Gray, '...from the seventeenth century onward'. It is argued that 'the future of the boiled suet pudding as one of England's national dishes was assured only when the pudding cloth came into use' and although puddings boiled in cloths may have been mentioned in the medieval era one of the earliest mentions is in 1617 in a recipe for the Cambridge pudding, a pudding cloth is indicated; 'throw your pudding in, being tied in a fair cloth; when it is boiled enough, cut it in the midst, and so serve it in'.

The pudding cloth is said, according to food historian C. Anne Wilson, to have revolutionised puddings. 'The invention of the pudding-cloth or bag finally severed the link between puddings and animal guts. Puddings could now be made at any time, and they became a regular part of the daily fare of almost all classes. Recipes for them proliferated.'

== Types ==
=== Baked, steamed, and boiled puddings ===
The original pudding was formed by mixing various ingredients with a grain product or other binder such as butter, flour, cereal, eggs or suet, resulting in a solid mass. These puddings are baked, steamed, or boiled. Depending on its ingredients, such a pudding may be served as a part of the main course or as a dessert.

Steamed pies consisting of a filling completely enclosed by suet pastry are also known as puddings. These may be sweet or savoury and include such dishes as steak and kidney pudding.

==== Savoury ====
- Batter puddings
  - Yorkshire pudding
  - Popovers
- Black pudding
- Boudin
- Cheese pudding
- Chireta
- Corn pudding
- Dock pudding
- Goetta
- Groaty pudding
- Haggis
- Kishke
- Kugel
- Livermush
- Moin moin
- Pease pudding
- Pennsylvania Dutch hog maw
- Polenta (mămăligă, cornmeal mush)
- Red pudding
- Scrapple
- Spoon bread
- Steak and kidney pudding
- Toad in the hole
- White pudding
- Yorkshire pudding

==== Dessert ====
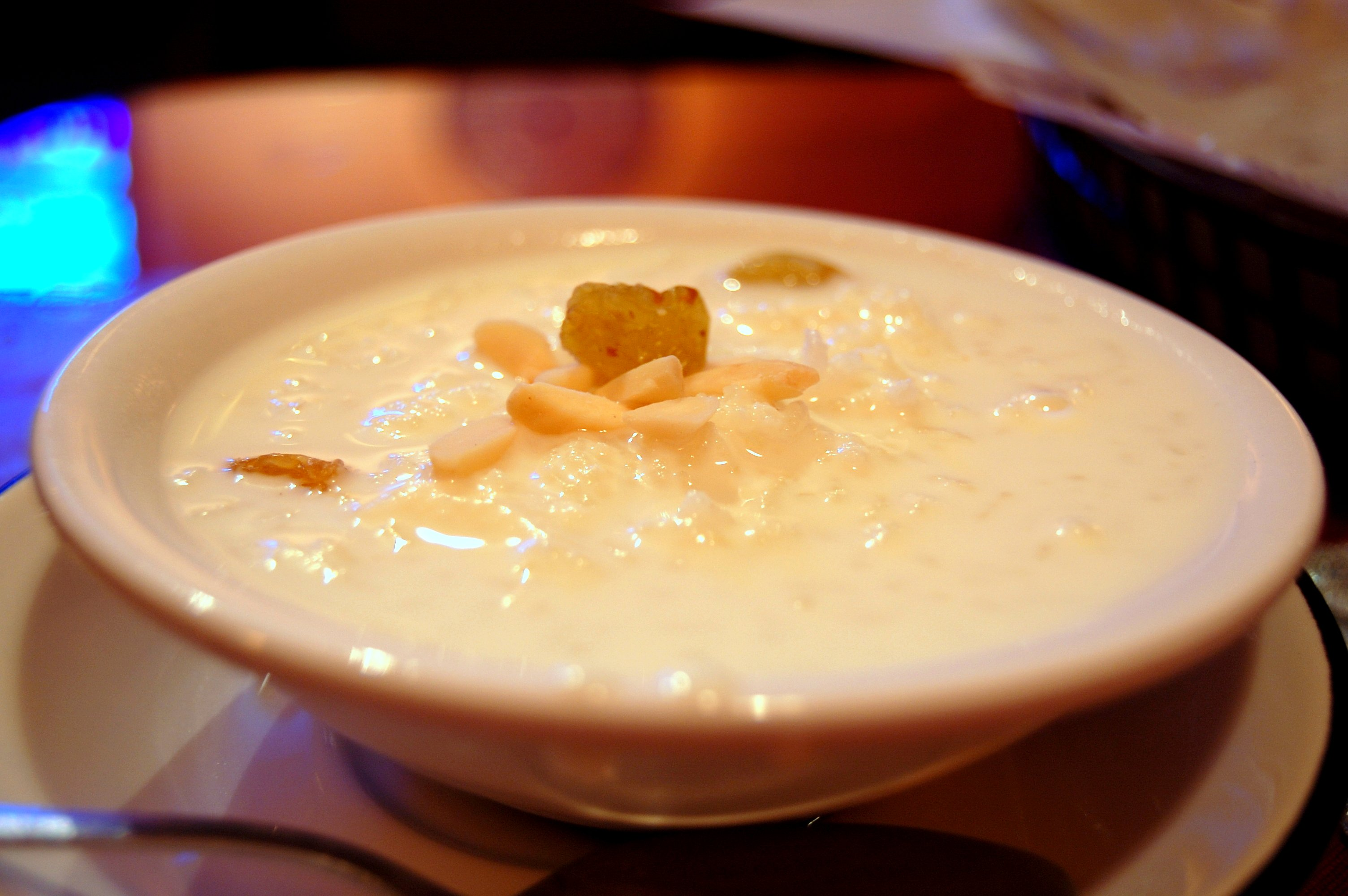
Kheer, from India, here made with rice

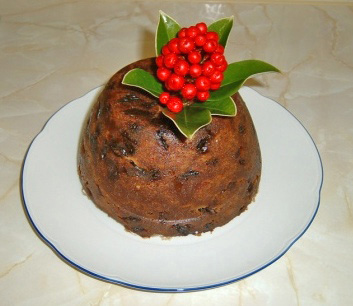
Christmas pudding

- Bread pudding
- Bread and butter pudding
- Butterscotch pudding, flavoured blancmange
- Cabinet pudding
- Cambridge pudding
- Chestnut pudding
- Chè
- Crème caramel
- Chicken pudding
- Chocolate pudding
- Christmas pudding (plum pudding)
- Clootie dumpling
- Cottage pudding
- Indian pudding
- Figgy duff (pudding)
- Figgy pudding
- Fruit pudding
- Hasty pudding
- Jam roly-poly
- Kentish cherry batter pudding
- Lemon delicious pudding
- Muhallebi
- Persimmon pudding
- Rice pudding
- Sago pudding
- Semolina pudding
- Spotted dick
- Sticky toffee pudding
- Summer pudding
- Sussex pond pudding
- Sweet potato pudding
- Tapioca pudding
- Tembleque
- Treacle sponge pudding
- Vanilla pudding, flavoured blancmange

=== Creamy puddings ===
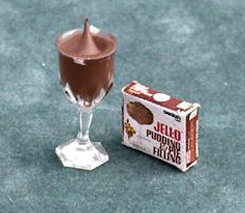
Instant dessert pudding

The second and newer type of pudding consists of sugar, milk, and a thickening agent such as cornstarch, gelatin, eggs, rice or tapioca to create a sweet, creamy dessert. These puddings are made either by simmering on top of the stove in a saucepan or double boiler or by baking in an oven, often in a bain-marie. These puddings are easily scorched on the fire, which is why a double boiler is often used; microwave ovens are also now often used to avoid this problem and to reduce stirring.

Creamy puddings are typically served chilled, but a few, such as zabaglione and rice pudding, may be served warm. Instant puddings do not require boiling and can therefore be prepared more quickly.

This pudding terminology is common in North America and some European countries such as the Netherlands, whilst in Britain, egg-thickened puddings are considered custards and starch-thickened puddings called blancmange.

Table cream is a dessert, similar to blancmange. The dessert was popularized by English manufacturer Symington's Ltd in the early 20th century. It is still produced under the Symington's brand name, but no longer made by the original company.

==== Savory ====
- Rice pudding

==== Dessert ====
- Abbeville Gypsy
- Angel Delight
- Banana pudding
- Bavarian cream
- Blancmange
- Budino
- Chinese flan
- Crema catalana
- Crème anglaise
- Crème brûlée
- Crème caramel
- Custard
- Flan
- Fruit fool
- Haupia
- Junket
- Jell-O
- Muhallebi
- Mango pudding
- Mousse
- Ogi
- Panna cotta
- Pistachio pudding
- Pot de crème
- Quesillo
- Rice pudding including kheer
- Semolina pudding
- Syllabub
- Tocino de cielo
- Trifle
- Vla
- Zabaione

== Cultural references ==
- The proverb "The proof of the pudding is in the eating" dates back to at least the 14th century. The phrase is widely attributed to the Spanish author Miguel de Cervantes in his novel The Ingenious Gentleman Don Quixote. The phrase is often incorrectly stated as "the proof is in the pudding."
- Pudd'nhead Wilson, (1894) written by Mark Twain, reflects the term's use as a metaphor for someone with the mind of a fool.
- The Magic Pudding is a classic Australian children's novel first published in 1918, written and illustrated by author Norman Lindsay. It tells of a bad-tempered, anthropomorphic pudding named Albert who, no matter how often he is eaten, always reforms in order to be eaten again. He is owned by three companions who must defend him against Pudding Thieves who want Albert for themselves.
- Pink Floyd's Another Brick in the Wall, part 2 (1979) ends with the voice of a Scottish-accented schoolmaster, actor Alex McAvoy (1928–2005) shouting, "If you don't eat your meat, you can't have any pudding! How can you have any pudding if you don't eat your meat?!" over and over again.
- A website dedicated to the dessert, online since the mid-1990s and consisting only of a low-quality image of it, became famous in Brazil for its humorous and longstanding nature. In 2015, it was hacked by the Islamic State.

== See also ==
- List of baked goods
- List of desserts
- List of savoury puddings
- List of sweet puddings
- Mousse
- The Pudding Club

== Sources ==
- Chisholm, Hugh, ed. (1911). "Pudding" . Encyclopædia Britannica (11th ed.). Cambridge University Press.
