= We Wish You a Merry Christmas =

English Christmas carol

- Genre: Christmas
- Language: English

"We Wish You a Merry Christmas" is an English Christmas carol, listed as numbers 230 and 9681 in the Roud Folk Song Index. The famous version of the carol is from the English West Country.

== Popular version ==
The Bristol-based composer, conductor and organist Arthur Warrell (1883–1939) is responsible for the popularity of the carol. Warrell, a lecturer at the University of Bristol from 1909, arranged the tune for his own University of Bristol Madrigal Singers as an elaborate four-part arrangement, which he performed with them in concert on December 6, 1935. His composition was published by Oxford University Press the same year under the title "A Merry Christmas: West Country traditional song".

Warrell's arrangement is notable for using "I" instead of "we" in the words; the first line is "I wish you a Merry Christmas". It was subsequently republished in the collection Carols for Choirs (1961), and remains widely performed.

Many traditional versions of the song have been recorded, some of which replace the last line with "Good tidings for Christmas and a happy new year". In 1971, Roy Palmer recorded George Dunn of Quarry Bank, Staffordshire singing a version close to the famous one, which had a familiar version of the chorus, but used the song "Christmas Is Coming" as the verses; this recording can be heard on the Vaughan Williams Memorial Library website. Amy Ford of Low Ham, Somerset sang a version called "The Singers Make Bold" to Bob and Jacqueline Patten in 1973 which again used a similar chorus to the famous version and can be heard via the British Library Sound Archive. There are several supposedly traditional recordings which follow the famous version exactly, but these are almost certainly derived from Arthur Warrell's arrangement.

== History ==
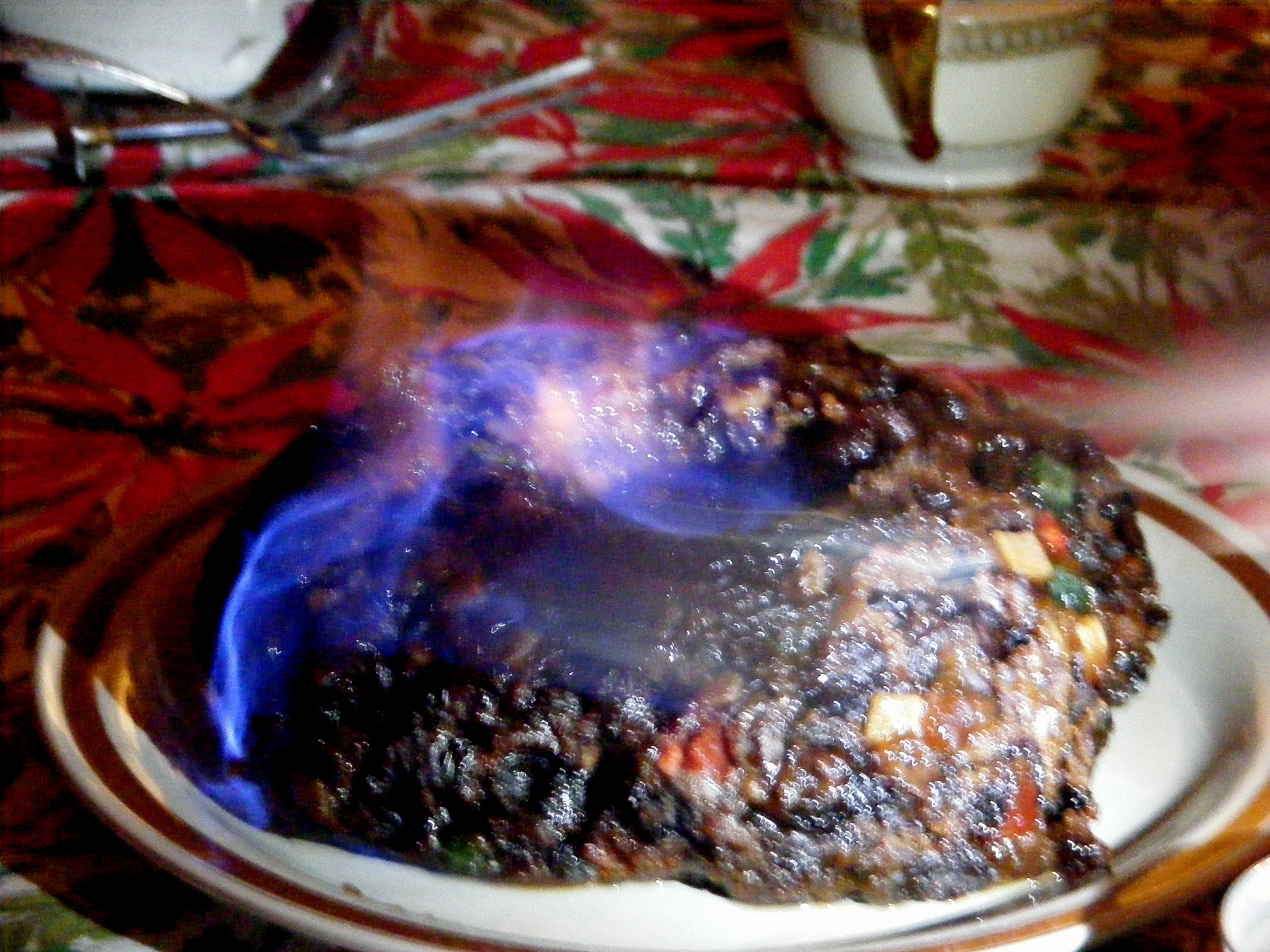
Figgy pudding is referenced in the latter verses of the carol

The greeting "A merry Christmas and a happy New Year" is recorded from the early 18th century; however, the history of the carol itself has yet to be clarified at the moment. Its origin probably lies in the English tradition wherein wealthy people of the community gave Christmas treats to carolers on Christmas Eve, such as "figgy pudding" that was very much like modern-day Christmas puddings; in the West Country of England, "figgy pudding" referred to a raisin or plum pudding, not necessarily one containing figs. In the famous version of the song, the singer demands figgy pudding from the audience, threatening to not "go until we get some."

The song is absent from the collections of West-countrymen Davies Gilbert (1822 and 1823) and William Sandys (1833), as well as from the great anthologies of Sylvester (1861) and Husk (1864), and The Oxford Book of Carols (1928). In the comprehensive New Oxford Book of Carols (1992), editors Hugh Keyte and Andrew Parrott describe it as "English traditional" and "[t]he remnant of an envoie much used by wassailers and other luck visitors"; no source or date is given. The famous version of the song was completely unknown outside the West Country before Arthur Warrell popularised it.

== "Cellar full of beer" variant ==
A closely related verse, dating from the 1830s, runs:

We wish you a merry Christmas
And a happy new year;
A pocket full of money,
And a cellar full of beer.

It was sung by mummers – townsfolk who would go about singing from door to door to request gifts. An example is given in the short story The Christmas Mummers (1858) by Charlotte Yonge:

When at last they were all ready, off they marched, with all the little boys and girls running behind them; and went straight to Farmer Buller’s door, where they knew they should find a welcome. They all stood in a row, and began to sing as loud as they were able:

I wish you a merry Christmas
And a happy New Year,
A pantryful of good roast-beef,
And barrels full of beer.

After they are allowed in and perform a Mummers play, the boys are served beer by the farmer's maid.

Various sources place this version of the song in different parts of England during the nineteenth century. Several versions survived into the twentieth century and were recorded by folk song collectors in England, such as those of George Dunn and Mary Evans of Quarry Bank, Staffordshire (both recorded in 1971), as well as Miss J. Howman of Stow-on-the-Wold, Gloucestershire (1966), all of which are publicly available online courtesy of the Vaughan Williams Memorial Library. These versions use completely different tunes to the now famous West Country variant.

== See also ==
- List of Christmas carols
- Christmas music
