= Pudding cloth =

Culinary utensil

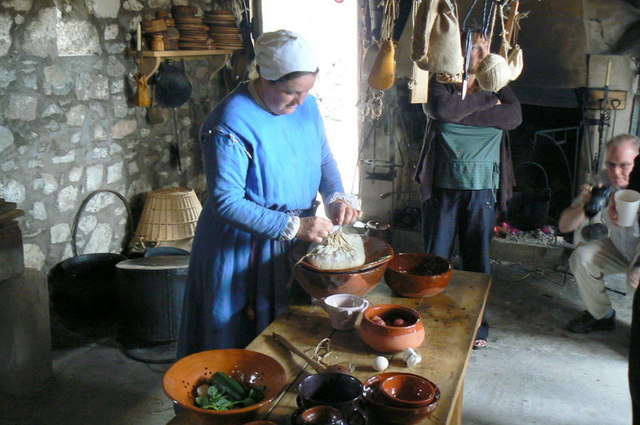
Preparation of a pudding with a pudding cloth

A pudding cloth is a culinary utensil similar to a cheesecloth or muslin. It is a reusable alternative to cooking in skins made of animal intestines and became popular in England in the seventeenth century for boiling a wide range of puddings.

== Typical uses ==
=== Sweet ===
Prior to the 19th century, the English Christmas pudding was boiled in a pudding cloth. Clootie dumpling, a traditional Scottish dessert, is boiled in a pudding cloth. The traditional way to cook jam roly poly is using a pudding cloth.

=== Savoury ===
Pease pudding was first made possible at the beginning of the 17th century with the advent of the pudding cloth.
