= Jam roly-poly =

Traditional British pudding

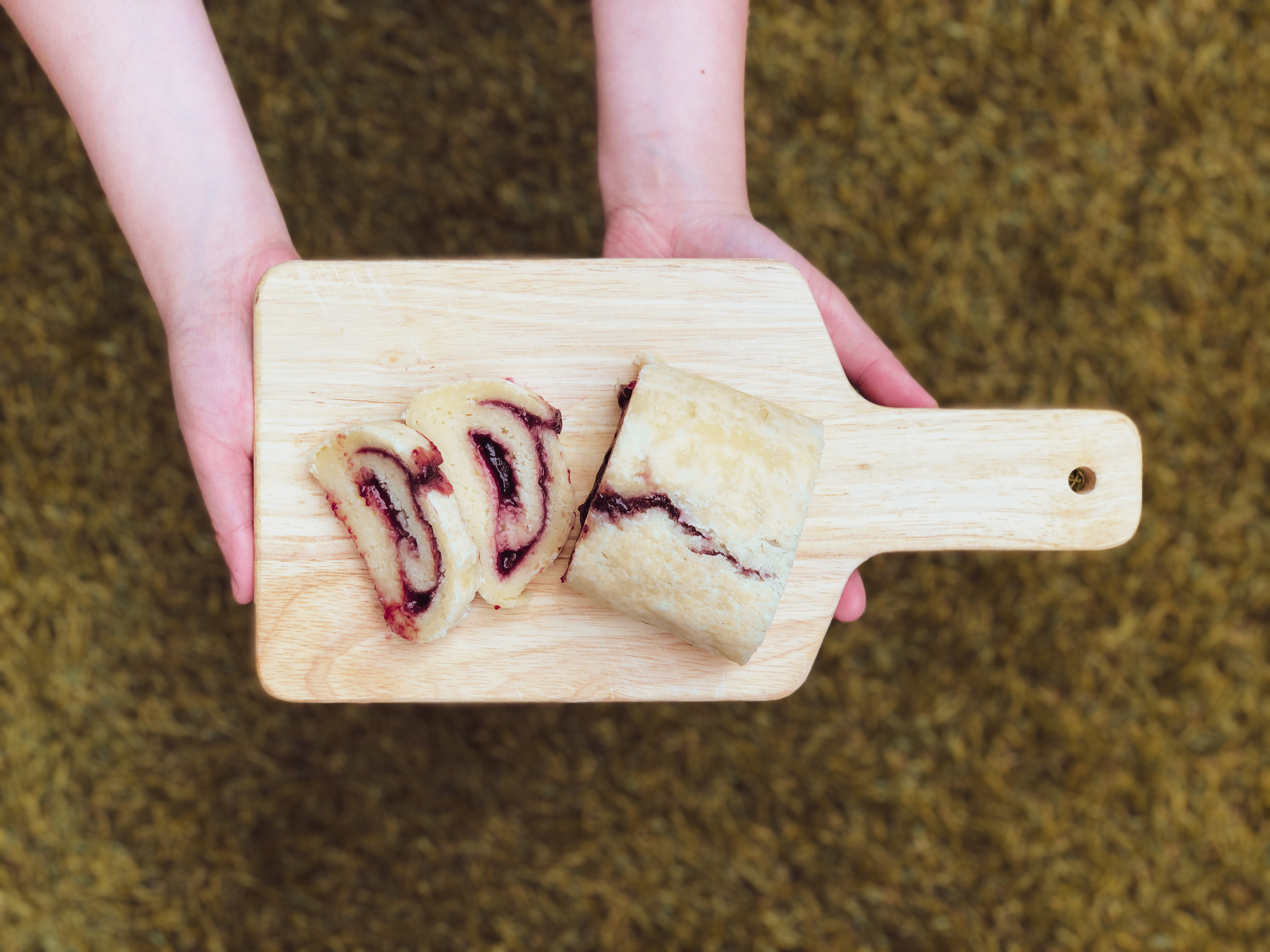
- Jam roly-poly
- Alternative names: Dead Man's Arm, Dead Man's Leg, Roly poly pudding
- Type: Pudding
- Place of origin: United Kingdom
- Main ingredients: Suet, jam

Jam roly-poly, shirt-sleeve pudding, dead man's arm or dead man's leg is a traditional British pudding probably first created in the early 19th century. It is a flat-rolled suet pudding, which is spread with jam and rolled up, similar to a Swiss roll, then steamed or baked and traditionally served with custard. In days past, jam roly-poly was also known as shirt-sleeve pudding, because it was often steamed and served in an old shirt-sleeve, leading to the nicknames of dead-man's arm and dead man's leg. In the past it was known as roly poly pudding.

== Description ==
The first printed recipe for a rolled suet pudding with jam, marmalade or mincemeat appeared in Eliza Acton's book Modern Cookery for Private Families in 1845. William Makepeace Thackeray writing in his Notes of a journey from Cornhill to Grand Cairo in 1846, stated "That lady I fancied I was looking at her, though, as far as I could see, she had the figure and complexion of a roly-poly pudding", while the word Roly-Poly appeared in James Orchard Halliwell-Phillips, A dictionary of archaic and provincial words, Volume II in 1847. The same recipe featured in Mrs Beeton's cookery book, as roly-poly jam pudding. It is one of a range of puddings that are now considered part of the classic desserts of the mid 20th century British school dinners. Jam roly-poly is considered a modern British classic, alongside sticky toffee pudding and spotted dick. In Beatrix Potter's 1908 book The Tale of Samuel Whiskers or, The Roly-Poly Pudding, the character Tom Kitten is rolled into a pudding by the invading rats.

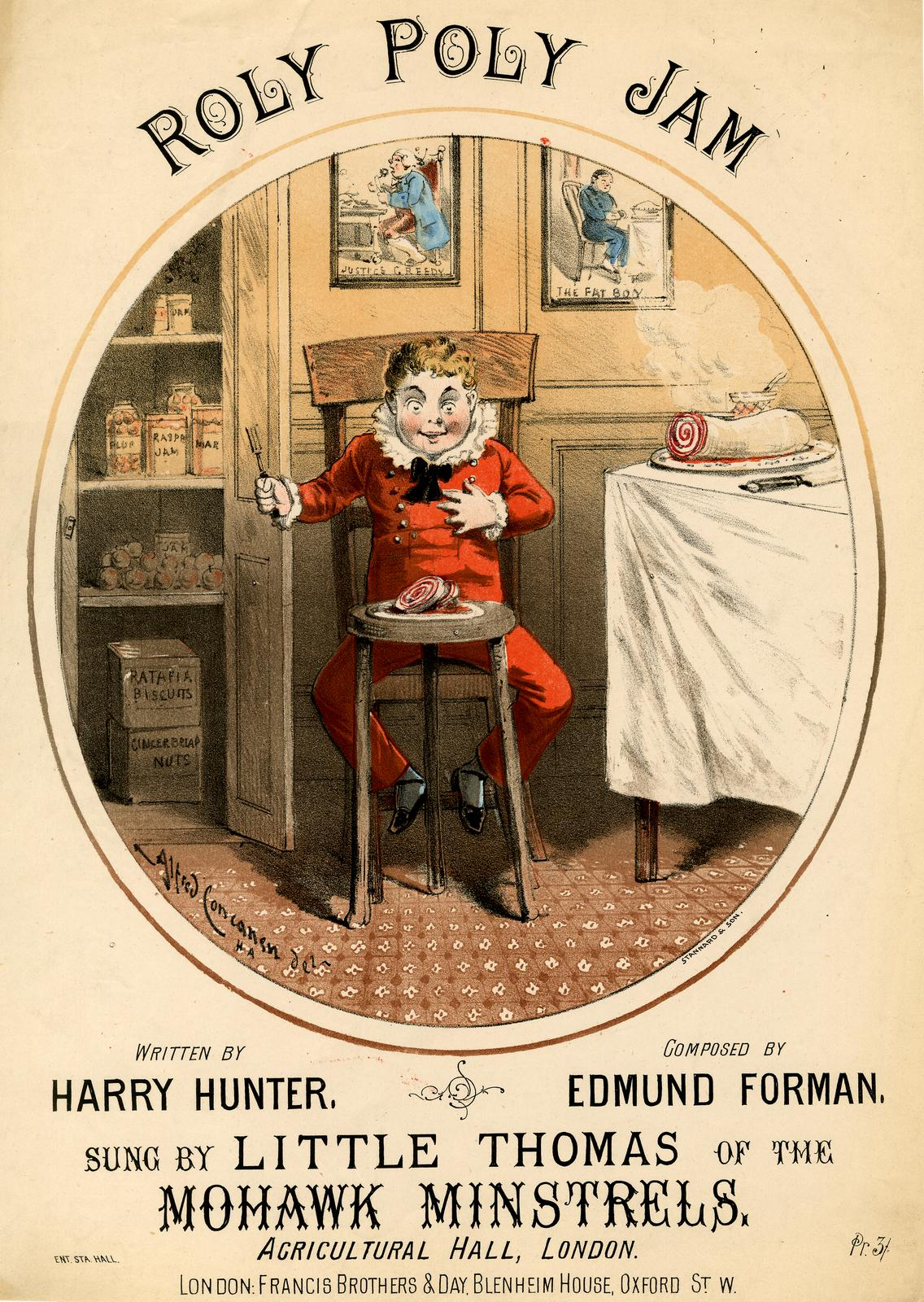
Greedy boy with roly poly pudding, 19th century

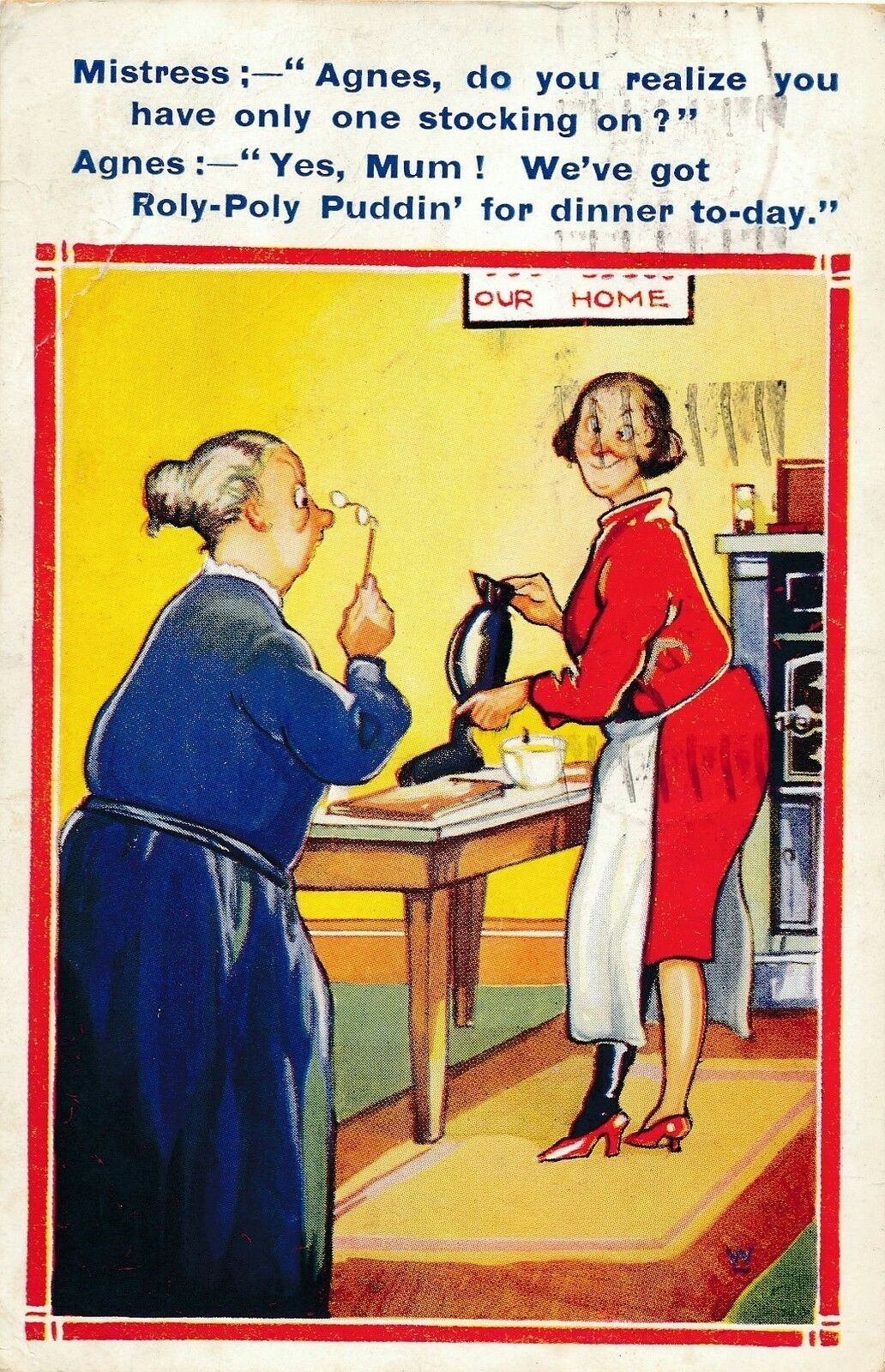
Joke about cooking roly poly pudding in a stocking, 1934

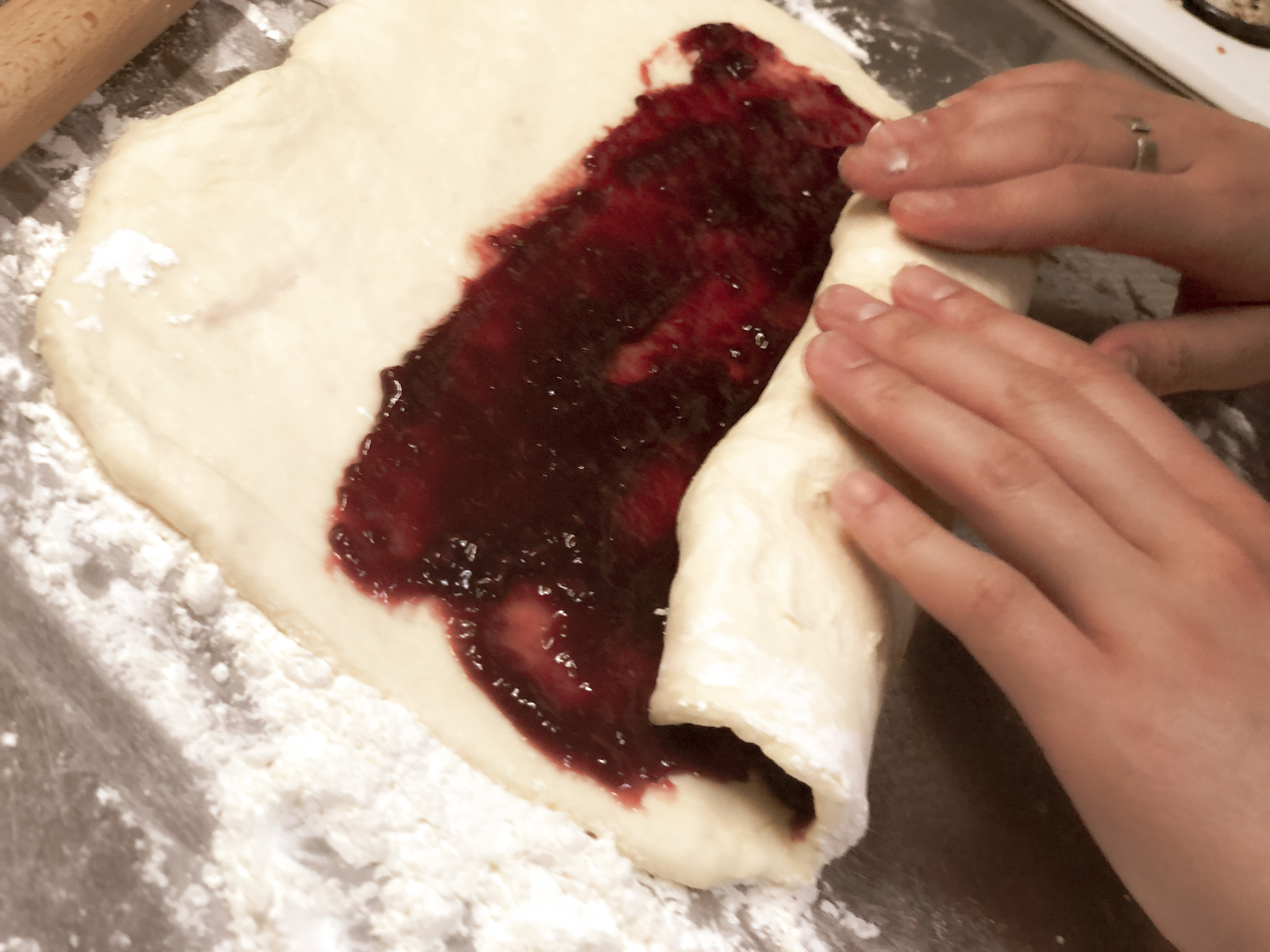
Jam roly poly preparation, 2021

== See also ==
- List of steamed foods
- Comfort food
