= Fruit pudding =

Scottish dish in the form of large sausage

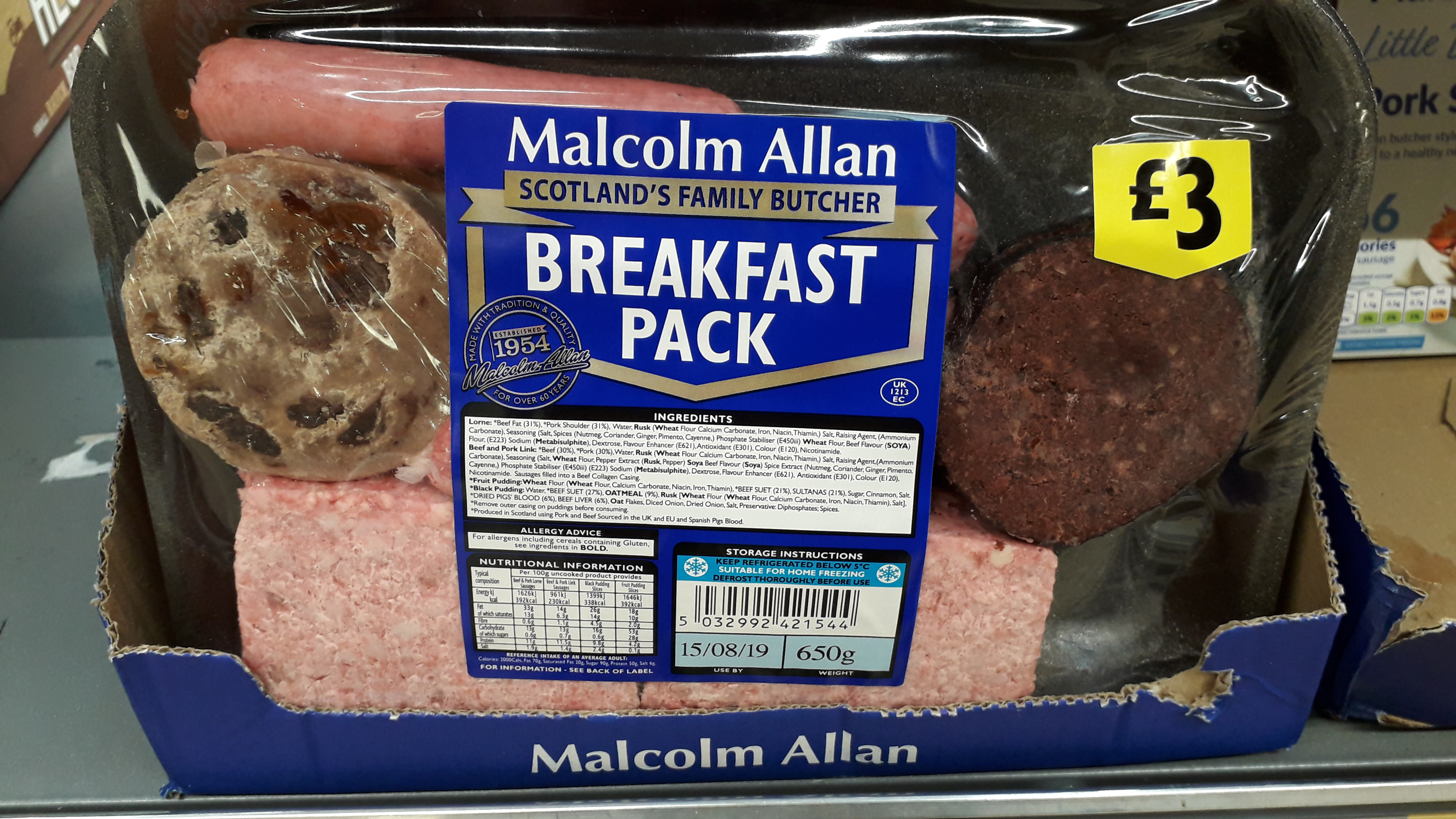
- Scottish breakfast pack showing sliced discs of fruit pudding on the left
- Type: Pudding
- Place of origin: Scotland
- Main ingredients: Oatmeal or wheat flour, beef suet, brown sugar, currants, raisins, sultanas, cinnamon

Fruit pudding is a Scottish dish which is a mixture of wheat or oatmeal flour or breadcrumbs, beef suet, brown sugar, currants, raisins, sultanas, salt and cinnamon, formed into the shape of a large sausage.

Normally cut into slices and fried, it is an optional feature of the traditional Scottish breakfast. Although served in this context as part of a savoury meal, its close relationship to clootie dumpling means it may also be served as a dessert.

Many Scottish producers of sausage, sliced sausage, black pudding, white pudding and haggis also make fruit pudding. It is not uncommon to find a "breakfast pack" consisting of sausage, sliced sausage, black pudding and fruit pudding on sale in Scottish shops.
