= Cabinet pudding =

Steamed sweet moulded pudding

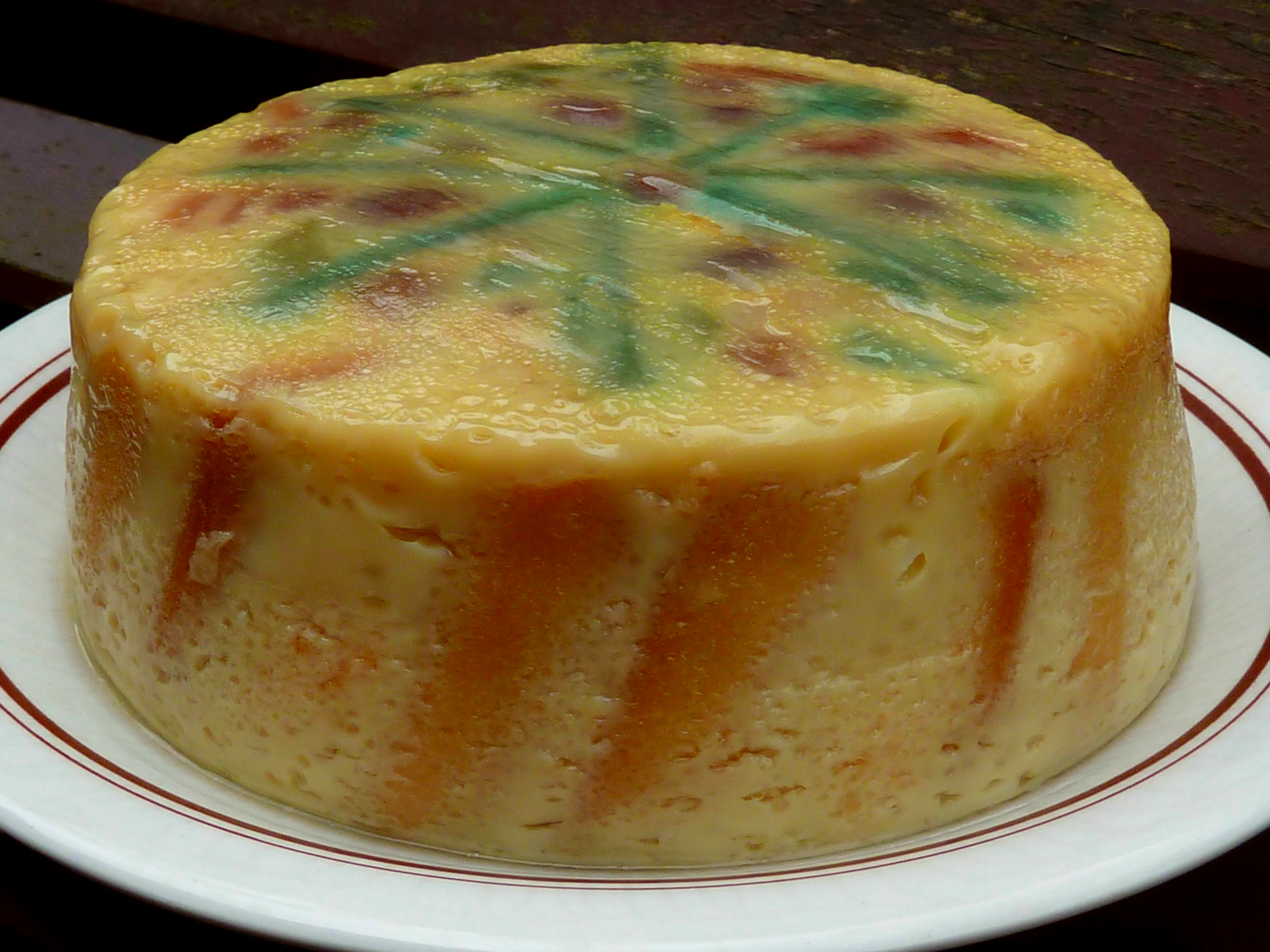
- Cabinet pudding (from a 1963 recipe)
- Alternative names: Chancellor’s pudding Newcastle pudding
- Type: Pudding
- Place of origin: United Kingdom
- Main ingredients: Bread or sponge cake, dried fruits

Cabinet pudding, also known as chancellor's pudding or Newcastle pudding, is a traditional English steamed, sweet, moulded pudding made from some combination of bread or sponge cake or similar ingredients in custard, cooked in a mould faced with decorative fruit pieces such as cherries or raisins, served with some form of sweet sauce. Other versions of cabinet pudding might use gelatin and whipped cream.

== Early recipes ==
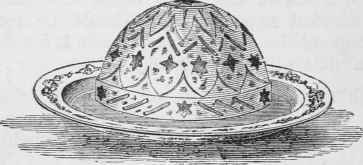
Engraving of cabinet pudding, 1882

One of the earliest recorded recipes can be found in John Mollard's 1836 work The Art of Cookery New edition.

Boil a pint of cream or milk, with a stick of cinnamon, and some lemon peel, for ten minutes, pour it over a quarter of a pound of Savoy cake, or of sponge biscuits, and, when cold, add two ounces of Jordan almonds scalded and chopped fine. Rub a mould with butter, line it with buttered paper, lay on the bottom and round the sides some dried cherries, pour in the mixture with six whites of eggs well beaten up added to it, and set the mould in a stewpan of boiling water, for three quarters of an hour. On serving put round a sauce made with fresh butter flour a little white wine and brandy, and some lemon juice.

== In literature ==
A reference appears in Benjamin Disraeli's first novel of 1826, Vivian Grey, where the title character teaches the Marquess of Carabas how to eat cabinet pudding with curacao sauce. In Josephine Tey's detective novel A Shilling for Candles, the "hard boiled but buoyant" hack journalist Jammy Hopkins bemoans a meal because "the potatoes were soapy, the cabinet pudding had tasted of baking soda". In London Belongs to Me Mr Josser complains when his cabinet pudding is served with custard rather than white sauce. In From the Terrace by John O'Hara (1958), the protagonist Alfred Eaton is served cabinet pudding for dessert after being offered an important job at James D. MacHardie's firm. Cabinet pudding is also mentioned in Julian Rathbone's novel A Spy of the Old School.

== See also ==
- List of steamed foods
