= Lemon delicious pudding =

Australian and New Zealand dessert

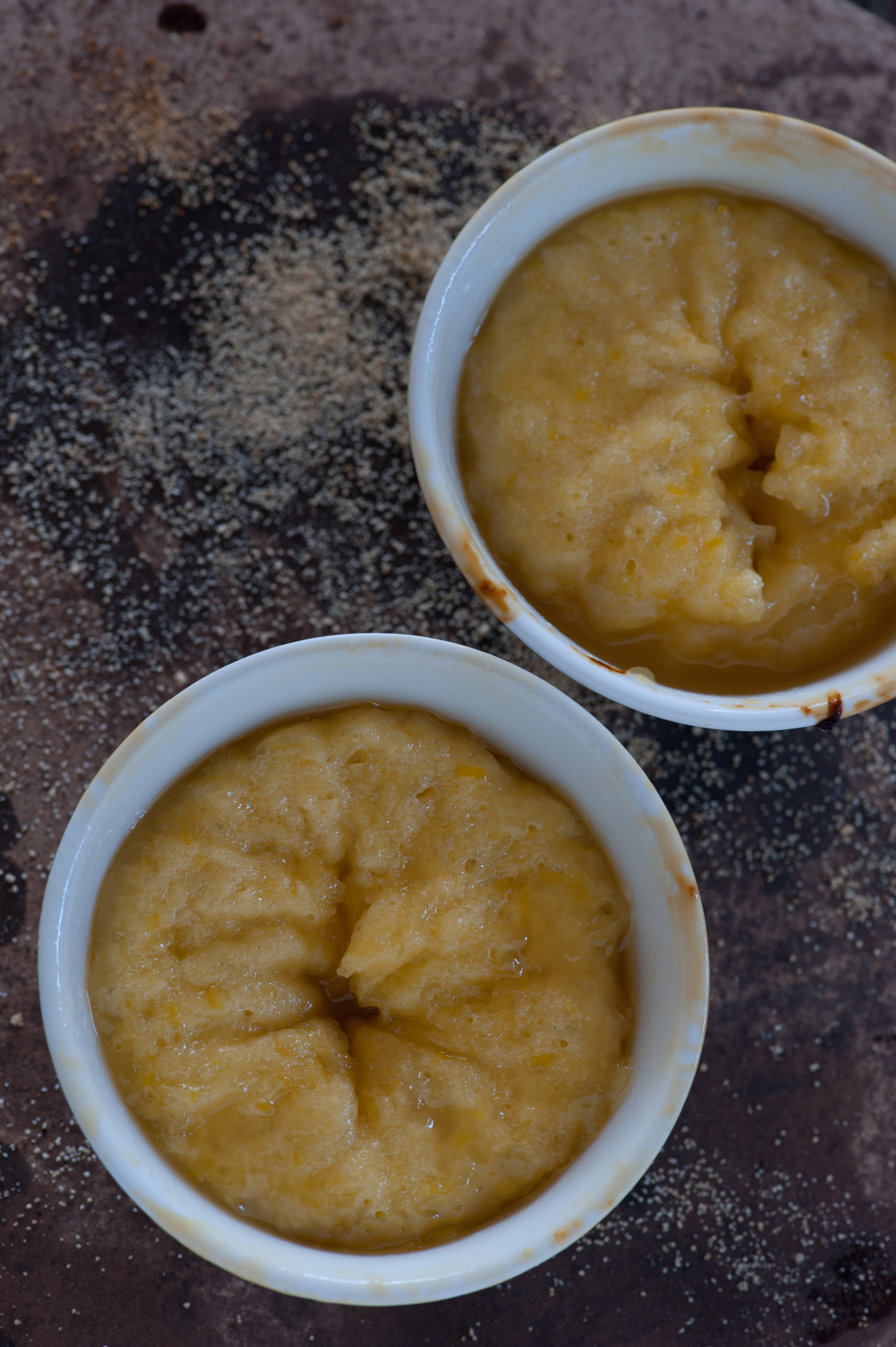
- Lemon delicious pudding
- Type: Pudding
- Course: Dessert
- Place of origin: United Kingdom, Australia, New Zealand
- Main ingredients: Lemon juice, lemon rind, sugar, milk, butter, eggs, flour

Lemon delicious pudding is an Australian and New Zealand dessert. As the pudding bakes, it separates, and the bottom remains a liquid lemony sauce while the top becomes fluffy and sponge-like. Similar recipes can be found in English cookbooks as far back as the 17th century.

A recipe from 1946 noted that while popular, the ingredients might be hard to come by under rationing and a letter to the editor in 1960 suggested that in times of economic prosperity it could be eaten weekly. There is a variant using orange in place of lemon.
