= Treacle =

Uncrystallized syrup

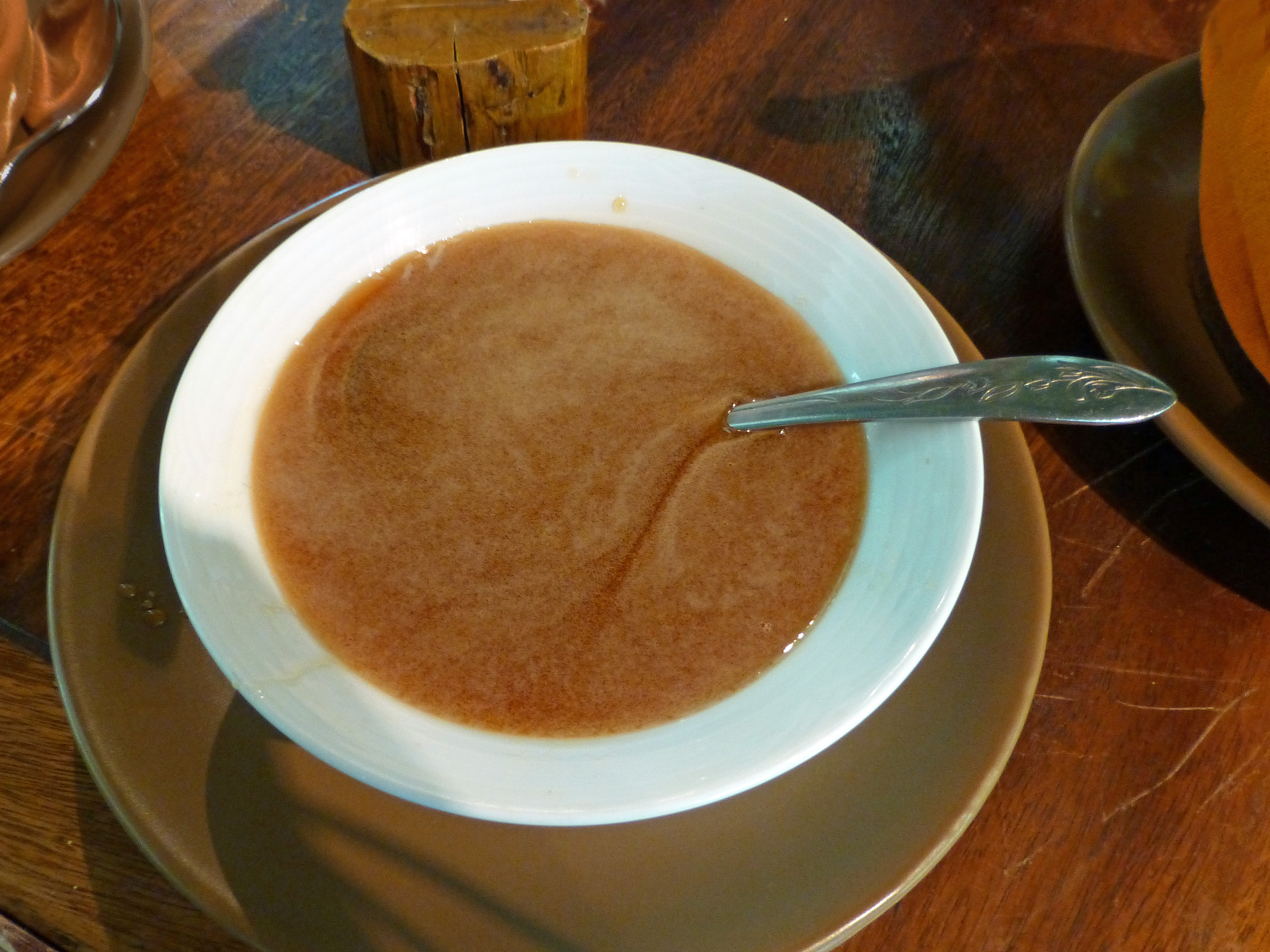
Treacle in a bowl

Treacle (/ˈtriːkəl/) is uncrystallised syrup made during the refining of sugar. The most common forms of treacle are golden syrup, a pale variety, and black treacle, a darker variety similar to molasses. Black treacle has a distinctively strong, slightly bitter flavour, and a richer colour than golden syrup. Golden syrup treacle is a common sweetener and condiment in British cuisine, found in such dishes as treacle tart and treacle sponge pudding.

== Etymology ==
Historically, the Middle English term treacle was used by herbalists and apothecaries to describe a medicine (also called theriac or theriaca), composed of many ingredients, that was used as an antidote for poisons, snakebites, and various other ailments. This use of treacle comes from the Old French triacle, in turn from (unattested and reconstructed) Vulgar Latin *triacula, which comes from Latin theriaca, the latinisation of the Greek θηριακή (thēriakē), the feminine of θηριακός (thēriakos), 'concerning venomous beasts', which comes from θηρίον (thērion), 'wild animal, beast'.

In Alice in Wonderland, by Lewis Carroll, during the mad tea party, the dormouse tells Alice a story about three sisters who lived at the bottom of a well filled with treacle instead of water. This is a reference to a real, ancient well at the Church of St Margaret in Binsey, just outside Oxford, playing on the historical, medicinal sense of the word treacle; according to legend, the water from St. Margaret's well has healing powers, and has been known by locals as the "treacle well". This allusion would have been immediately familiar to Carroll's readership in Victorian-era Oxford.

== Production ==
Treacle is made from the syrup that remains after sugar is refined. Raw sugars are first treated in a process called affination, wherein the raw sugar is mixed with warm syrup to remove the molasses coating from the sugar crystals; the crystals are then separated from the syrup via centrifuge and sprayed with water (or "washed") to remove any residual coating. The resulting liquor (made from the affined sugar dissolved in water) is then further refined by treatment with activated carbon or bone char. The dark-coloured "washings" (i.e. the syrup after being used to remove the molasses) are treated separately, without carbon or bone char. They are boiled to grain (i.e., until remaining sugar crystals precipitate out) in a vacuum pan, forming a low-grade masse cuite (boiled mass) which itself is centrifuged, yielding a brown sugar and a liquid by-product—treacle.

Black treacle (molasses) naturally contains relatively high levels of sulphite (>100 ppm, expressed in sulphur dioxide equivalent). These levels are deemed safe for the majority of the population. However, some allergic and respiratory reactions have been reported particularly amongst asthmatics, such that the United States Food and Drug Administration (FDA) requires that levels over 10ppm, i.e. >10 mg/kg, be declared on the ingredients label.

== See also ==
- Caramelisation
- List of syrups
- Stroopwafel
- Treacle mining
- Treacle protein
- Treacle sponge pudding
- Theriaca andromachi or "Treacle of Andromachu", also known as "Venice treacle" – an ancient medicinal preparation
