= White pudding =

Meat and grain dish

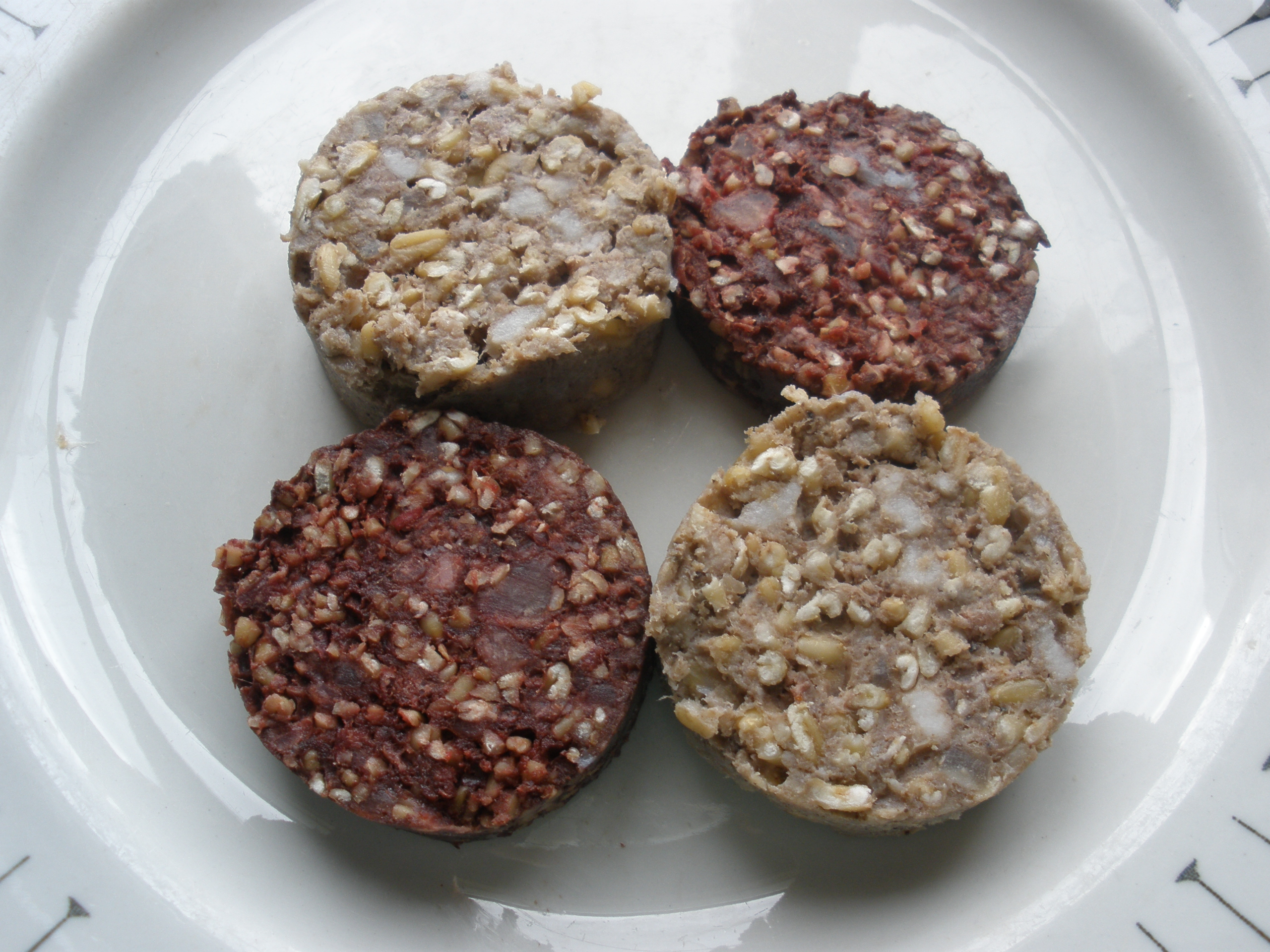
- Irish black and white pudding
- Alternative names: Irish: putóg bhán, marag gheal
- Type: Pudding
- Main ingredients: oatmeal or barley; suet; pork meat or liver
- Variations: Hog's pudding

White pudding, oatmeal pudding or (in Scotland) mealy pudding is a meat dish in Great Britain and Ireland.

White pudding is broadly similar to black pudding, but does not include blood. Modern recipes consist of suet or fat, oatmeal or barley, breadcrumbs, and in some cases, pork and pork liver, filled into a natural or cellulose sausage casing. Recipes in previous centuries included a wider range of ingredients.

== History and recipes ==
White pudding is often thought of as a very old dish that, like black pudding, was a traditional way of making use of offal following the annual slaughter of livestock. Whereas black pudding-type recipes appear in Roman sources, white pudding likely has specifically medieval origins, possibly as a culinary descendant of medieval sweetened blancmange-type recipes combining shredded chicken, rice and almonds, or as a way of lightening up offal with the addition of cream, eggs and breadcrumbs. Meatless versions were common, as they could be eaten during the Lenten period of abstinence. Many older recipes are sweetened: a 15th-century British pudding combined pork liver, cream, eggs, breadcrumbs, raisins and dates, while a 1588 recipe collection featured a white pudding made of beef suet, breadcrumbs, egg yolk and currants, flavoured with nutmeg, sugar and cinnamon. A similar recipe given in Woolley's 1670 book The Queen-Like Closet used hog's lights and was filled into intestine sausage-skins. By the mid-18th century, Elizabeth Raffald's white pudding recipe, "White Puddings in Skins", combined rice, lard, ground almonds, currants and egg, using sugar, nutmeg, cinnamon and mace as flavourings; by this period the inclusion of offal such as liver or lights, as well as sweet flavourings, was becoming rarer.

An oatmeal pudding recipe found in the 18th-century Compleat Housewife is made with beef suet and cream, thickened with oatmeal and mixed up with egg yolks, then baked in a dish with marrow.

Alongside these more refined and elaborate recipes, a simpler form of white pudding was popular in Ireland, Scotland, the West Country and some parts of Northern England, combining suet, oatmeal (or barley in Northumberland), seasoning and onions, in sheep's or cow's intestines. In Gaelic-speaking parts of Scotland and Ireland, they were referred to by the names marag gheal or putóg bhán. These oatmeal-based puddings survived into modern Irish and Scottish cuisine, although with significant regional differences. In Cornwall and Devon, these are either Hog's or Groats pudding depending on the fineness or coarseness of texture. Modern commercially made Scottish white puddings are generally based on oatmeal, onions and beef suet; the same mixture simply fried in a pan is known as skirlie. In Ireland, white puddings also include a substantial proportion of pork or pork liver and pork fat. Most modern white puddings are filled into a synthetic cellulose casing and boiled or steamed; typical spices used include white pepper, nutmeg and sage.

== Preparation ==
White pudding may be cooked whole, or cut into slices and fried or grilled. Irish white pudding is an important feature of the traditional Irish breakfast. Scottish white pudding is often served, like skirlie, with minced beef and potatoes, or is available deep fried in many chip shops.

== Regional variants ==
White puddings were once also associated with south-western England: Taylor, in the 17th century, mentions "the white puddings of Somersetshire". Hog's pudding, still made in Somerset, Cornwall and Devon, is very similar to other white puddings although is somewhat more highly spiced.

Another Scottish variant, fruit pudding, includes dried fruit in addition to beef suet and oatmeal.

== See also ==
- Boudin
- Goetta
- Haggis
- Red pudding
- Scrapple
- Weißwurst
- List of Irish dishes
