= Cottage pudding =

American dessert of cake with glaze or custard

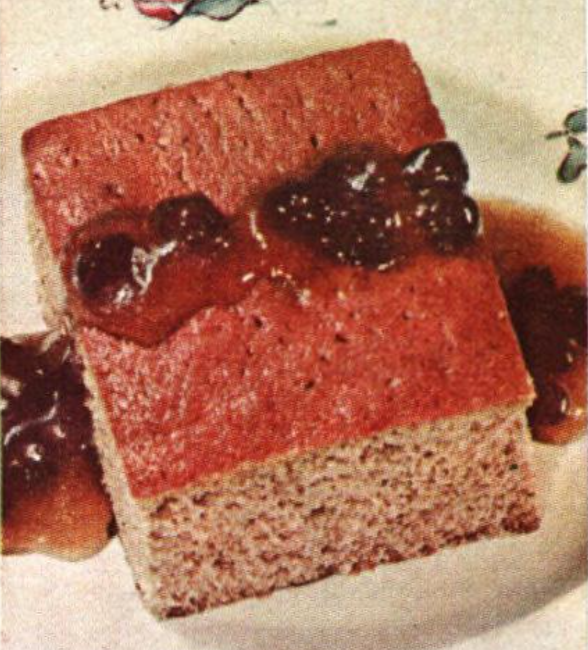
- Spiced cottage pudding, served with raisin sauce
- Type: Pudding
- Course: Dessert
- Place of origin: United States
- Main ingredients: Cake, glaze or custard

Cottage pudding is a traditional American dessert consisting of a plain, dense butter cake served with a sweet sauce, glaze, or custard poured over it.

The glaze is generally cornstarch based and flavored with sugar, vanilla, chocolate, butterscotch, or one of a variety of fruit flavors such as lemon or strawberry.

== History ==
One typical recipe is from Recipes Tried and True, a collection of recipes compiled in 1894 by the Ladies' Aid Society of the First Presbyterian Church in Marion, Ohio.

Cottage pudding can be baked over a fruit base, with a recipe from Fannie Farmer resulting in a dessert similar to a fruit cobbler, as in the recipe for Apple Pan Dowdy in The Fannie Farmer Cookbook.

== See also ==
- List of desserts
