= Red pudding =

Scottish meat dish

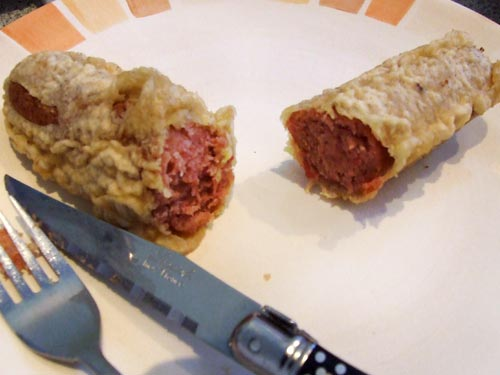
- A single battered deep-fried chip shop red pudding (approx. 8" long), sliced open
- Place of origin: Scotland
- Region or state: East Scotland, particularly Fife
- Main ingredients: Bacon, beef, pork, pork rind, suet, rusks, wheat flour, spices, beef fat

Red pudding is a meat dish served mainly at chip shops in some areas of Scotland. Red pudding is associated with the east of Scotland, particularly Fife, but has become less common in recent years. Its main ingredients are beef, pork, pork rind or bacon, suet, rusk, wheat flour, spices, salt, beef fat and colouring.

The mixture is formed into a sausage shape of roughly eight inches in length, similar to black and white pudding and the chip shop variant of haggis. The pudding is usually cooked by being coated in a batter, deep-fried, and served hot. Bought on its own, it is known as a "single red"; when accompanied by chips, it is known as a "red pudding supper".

== See also ==
- Boudin
- Scrapple
