= Treacle sponge pudding =

British dessert

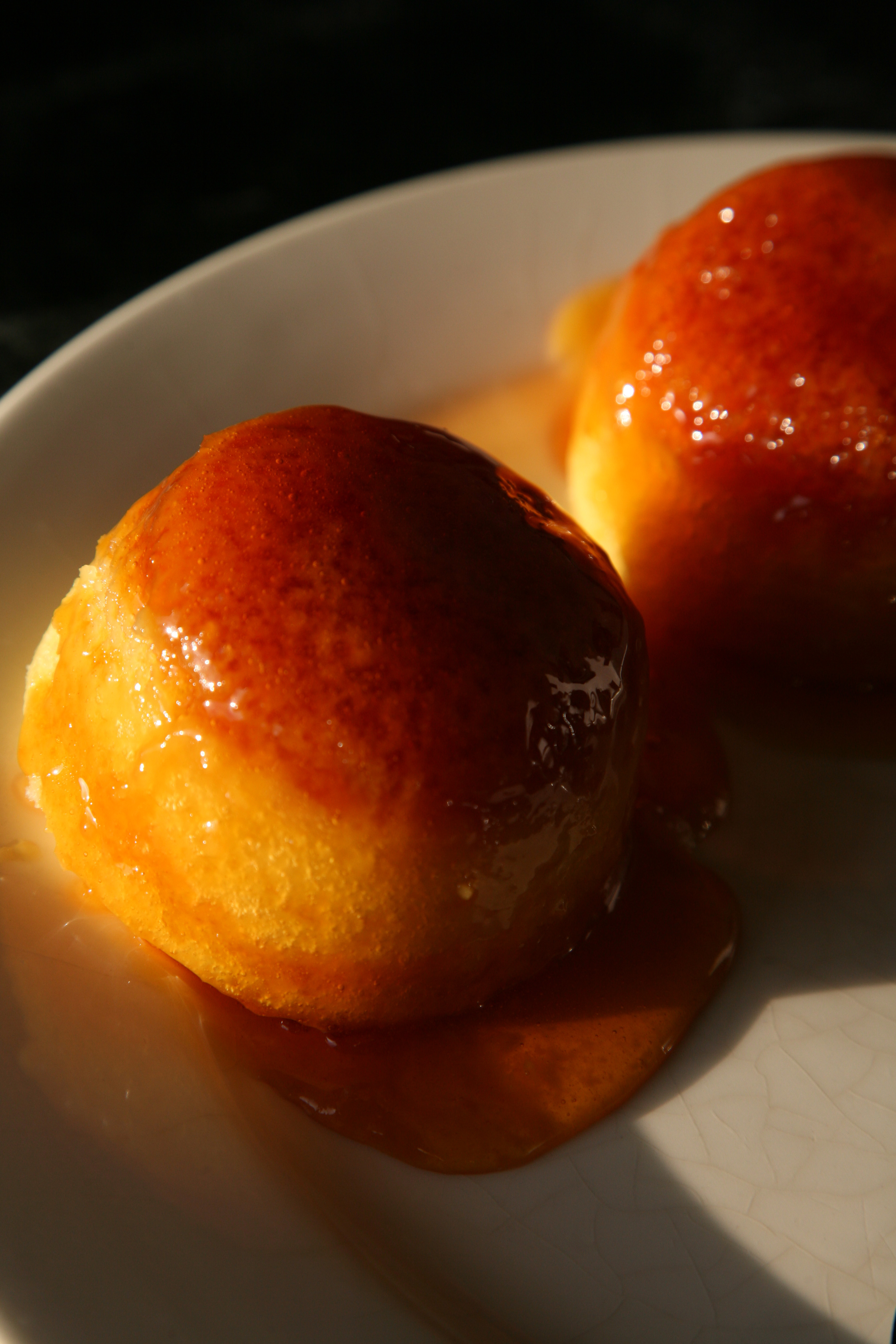
- Type: Pudding
- Course: Dessert
- Place of origin: United Kingdom
- Main ingredients: Sponge cake, Treacle

A treacle sponge pudding is a traditional British dessert dish consisting of a steamed sponge cake with treacle cooked on top of it, sometimes also poured over it and often served with hot custard.

The dish has been mass-produced and provided to consumers as a canned product that can be cooked in a microwave oven.

== See also ==
- List of steamed foods
