= Figgy pudding =

Christmas dish

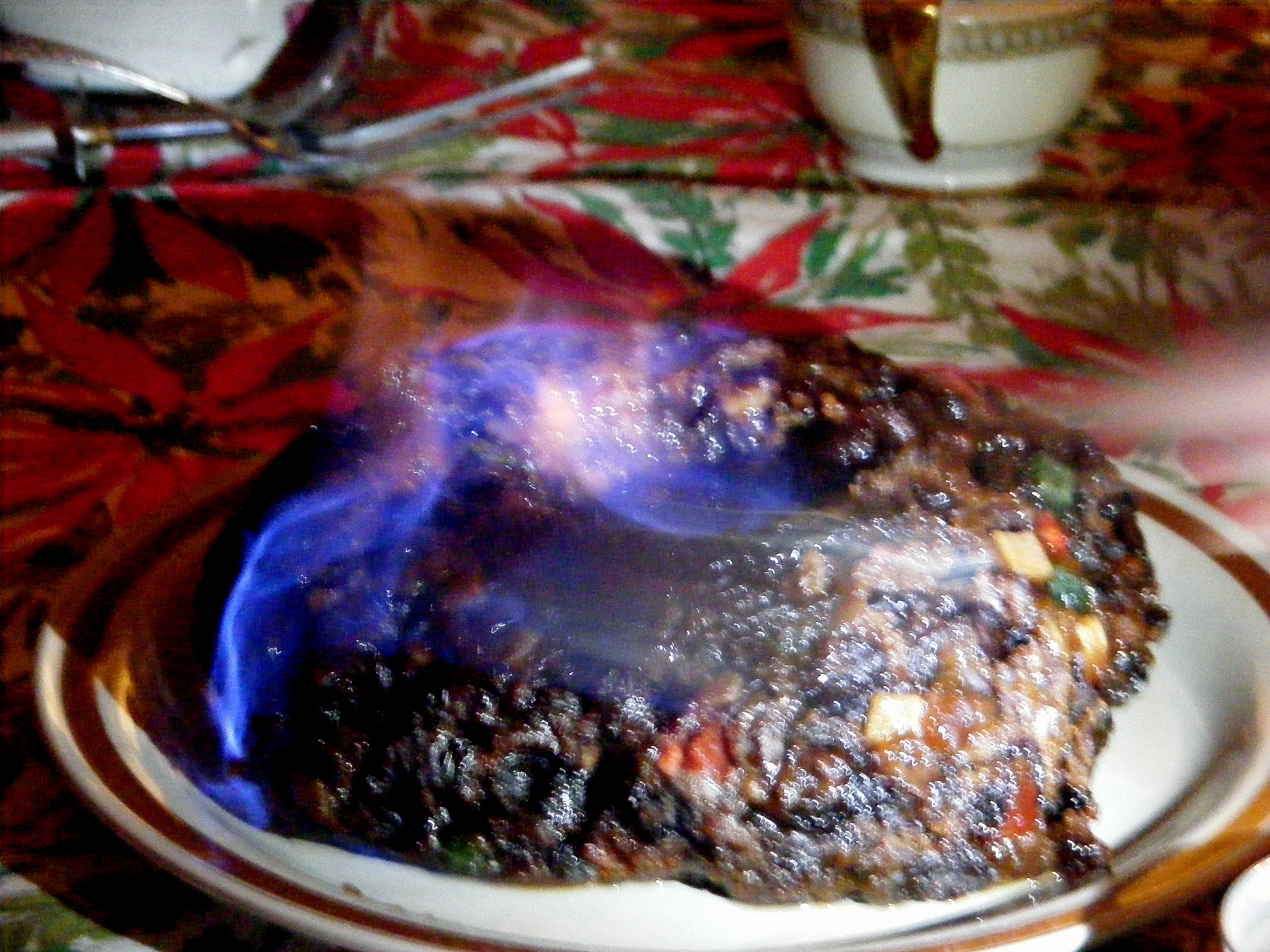
- Type: Pudding
- Place of origin: United Kingdom

Figgy pudding or fig pudding is any of many medieval Christmas dishes, usually sweet or savoury cakes containing honey, fruits and nuts. In later times, rum or other distilled alcohol was often added to enrich the fruitiness of the flavour.

== Etymology ==
Medieval cooking commonly employed figs in both sweet and savoury dishes. One such dish is fygey, in the 14th century cookbook The Forme of Cury.

Take Almaende blanched; grynde hem and drawe hem up with watr and wyne; quartr figs hole raisons. Cast þerto powdor gingr and hony clarified; seeþ it wel and salt it, and seve forth.

—The Forme of Cury recipe 118
Translation:

Take blanched almonds, grind them, mix with water and wine, quartered figs, whole raisins. Add in powdered ginger, clarified honey, boil it well and salt it, and serve.

The Middle English name had several spellings, including ffygey, fygeye, fygee, figge, and figee. The latter is a 15th-century conflation with a French dish of fish and curds called figé, meaning "curdled" in Old French. But it too came to mean a "figgy" dish, involving cooked figs, boiled in wine or otherwise. A turn of the 15th century herbal has a recipe for figee:

Nym figes, & boille hem in wyn, & bray hem in a morter with lied bred; tempre hit vp with goud wyn / boille it / do therto good spicere, & hole resons / dresse hit / florisshe it a-boue with pomme-garnetes.

—Laudian Manuscript 553, Bodleian Library
Translation:

Take figs and boil them in wine, and pound them in a mortar with bread. Mix it up with good wine; boil it. Add good spices and whole raisins. Dress it; decorate it with pomegranate seeds on top.

Liber Cure Cocorum has the recipe under the name "fignade" on page 42. Richard Warner's Antiquitates Culinariae has it under the name "fyge to potage". Mrs Beeton's Book of Household Management contains two different recipes for fig pudding that use suet, numbers 1275 and 1276.

== In popular culture ==
Often associated with the original traditions of Christmas, it is referred to in the Christmas carol "We Wish You a Merry Christmas" in the lines "Now bring us some figgy pudding," "We all love our figgy pudding," and "We won't go until we get some!" Figgy pudding is not plum pudding, although it can be considered a precursor to it. It is not as rich, nor as complex in its recipe.

== See also ==
- Figgy duff (pudding)
- Christmas pudding
