= Clootie dumpling =

Scottish suet pudding

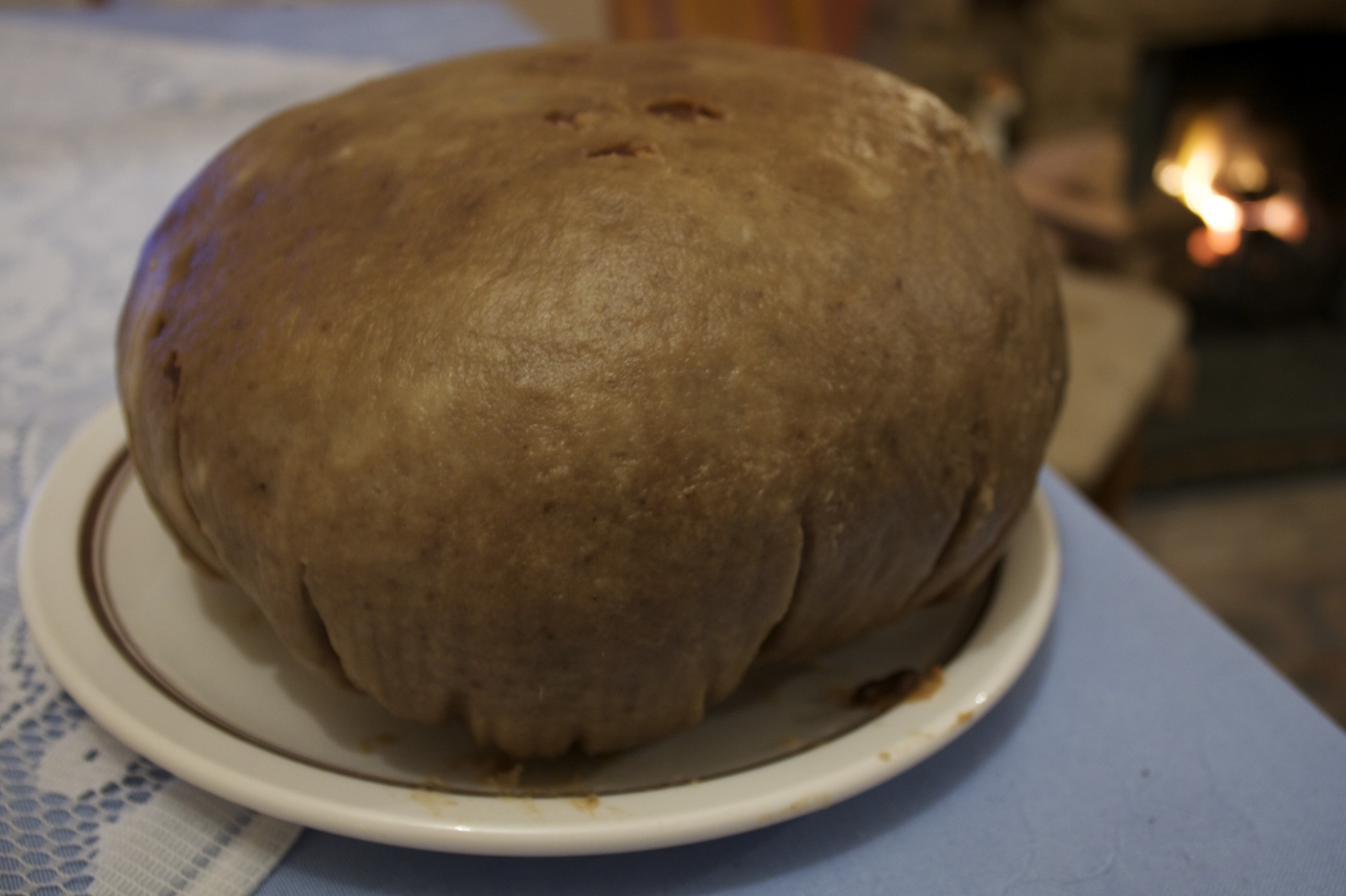
- Clootie dumpling
- Type: Pudding
- Place of origin: Scotland
- Main ingredients: Flour, dried fruit (currants, raisins, sultanas), suet, sugar, spices, milk

A clootie dumpling is a traditional Scottish pudding made with flour, breadcrumbs, dried fruit (currants, raisins, sultanas), suet, sugar and spices with some milk to bind it. Ingredients are mixed well into a dough, then wrapped up in a floured cloth (the clootie), placed in a large pan of boiling water and simmered for a few hours before being lifted out and dried near the fire or in an oven. Recipes vary from region to region.

"Clootie dumpling" has also been used as a nickname for the logo of the Scottish National Party.
