= List of British desserts =

This is a list of British desserts, i.e. desserts characteristic of British cuisine, the culinary tradition of the United Kingdom. The British kitchen has a long tradition of noted sweet-making, particularly with puddings, custards, and creams; custard sauce is called crème anglaise (English cream) in French cuisine.

== English desserts ==
=== A ===
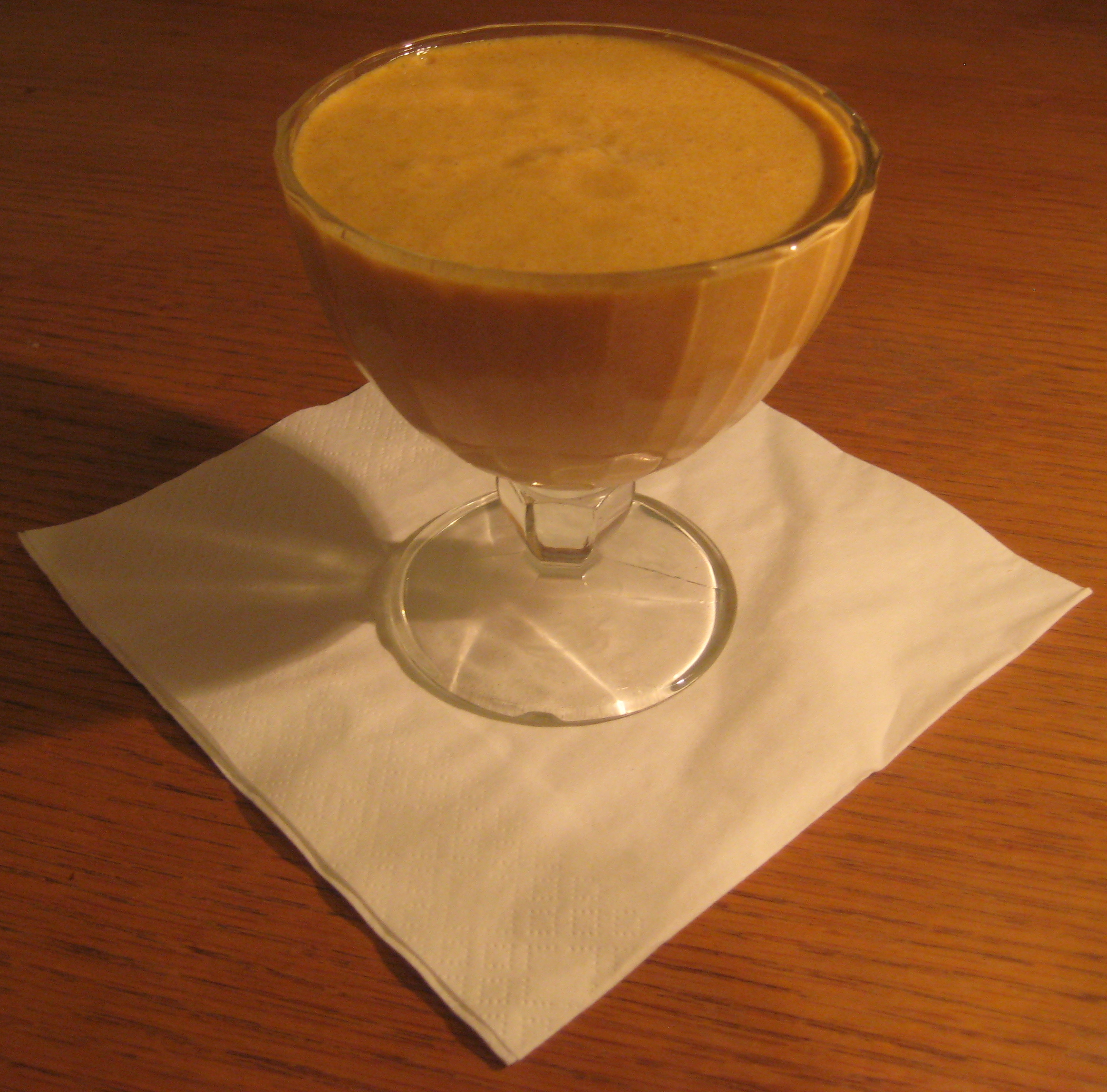
Butterscotch Angel Delight instant dessert

- Apple dumpling
- Apple pie
- Apple crumble
- Arctic roll

=== B ===
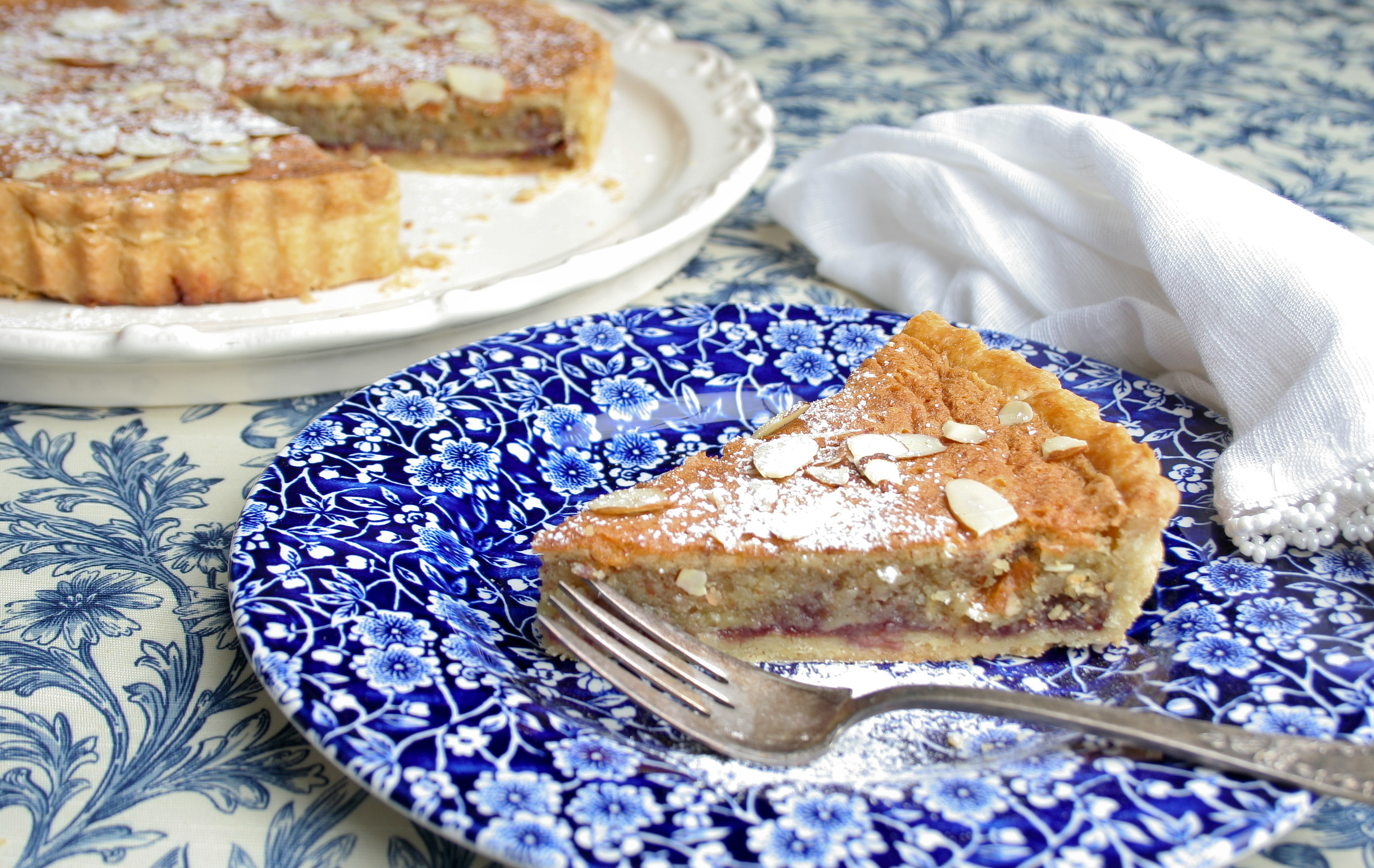
The Bakewell tart is an English confection consisting of a shortcrust pastry with a layer of jam and a sponge using ground almonds.

- Bakewell Pudding
- Bakewell tart
- Banoffee pie
- Blackberry pie
- Blackberry cobbler
- Bread and butter pudding
- Brandy snaps
- Biscuits
- Battenburg Cake

=== C ===
- Carrot cake
- Cherry pie
- Cherries jubilee
- Chestnut pudding
- Christmas pudding
- Cobbler
- Coconut ice
- Crumble
- Custard tart

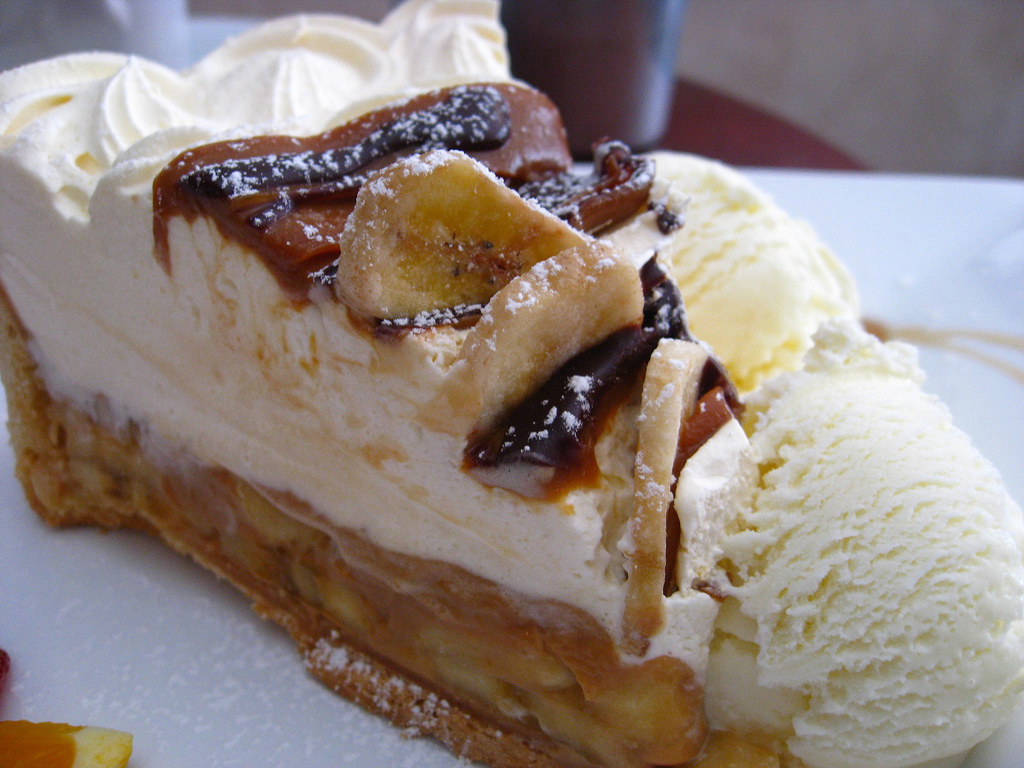
Banoffee pie is an English dessert pie made from bananas, cream and toffee from boiled condensed milk (or dulce de leche), either on a pastry base or one made from crumbled biscuits and butter.

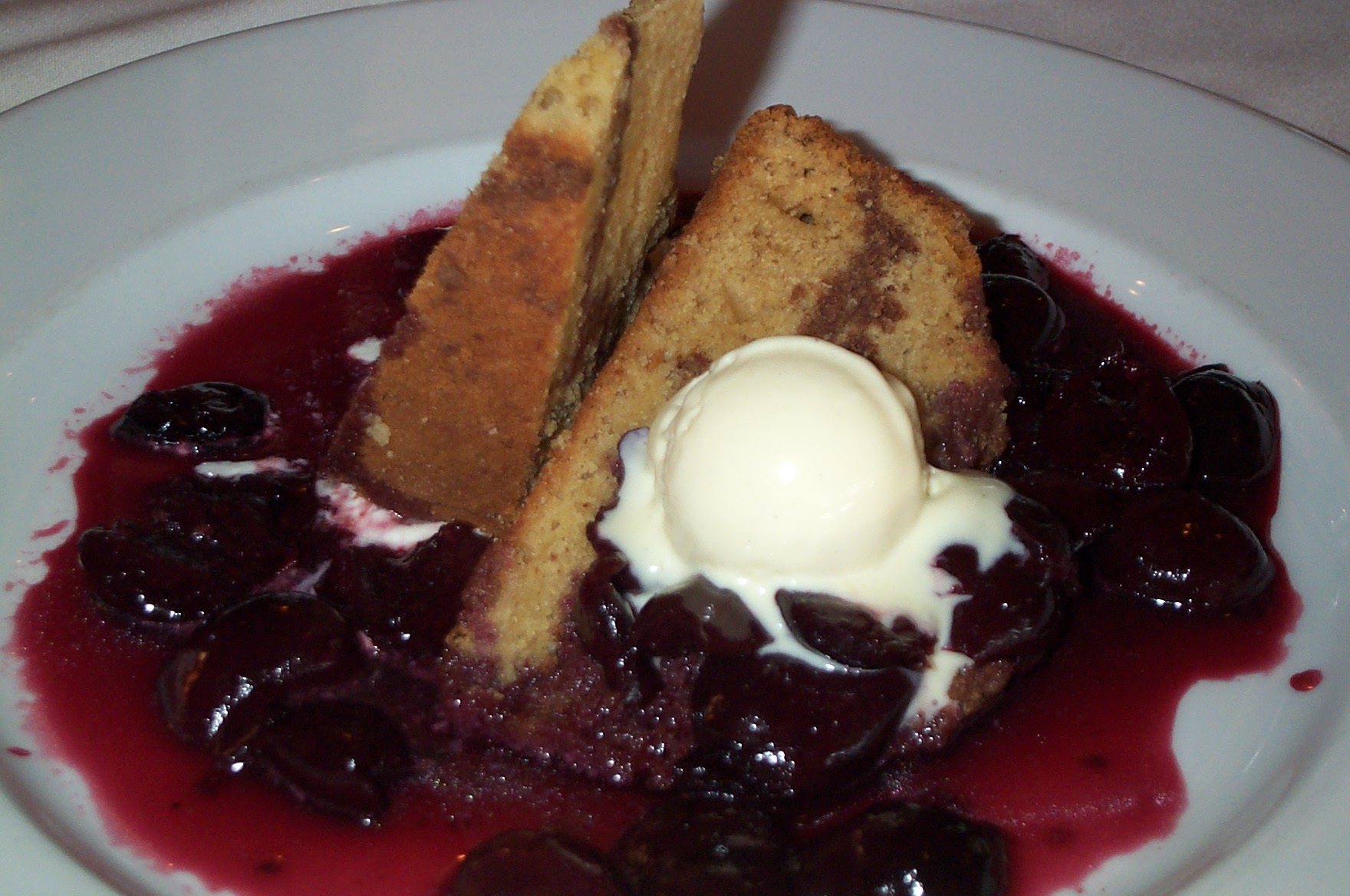
Cherries jubilee is prepared with cherries and liqueur (typically Kirschwasser), which is subsequently flambéed, and commonly served as a sauce over vanilla ice cream.

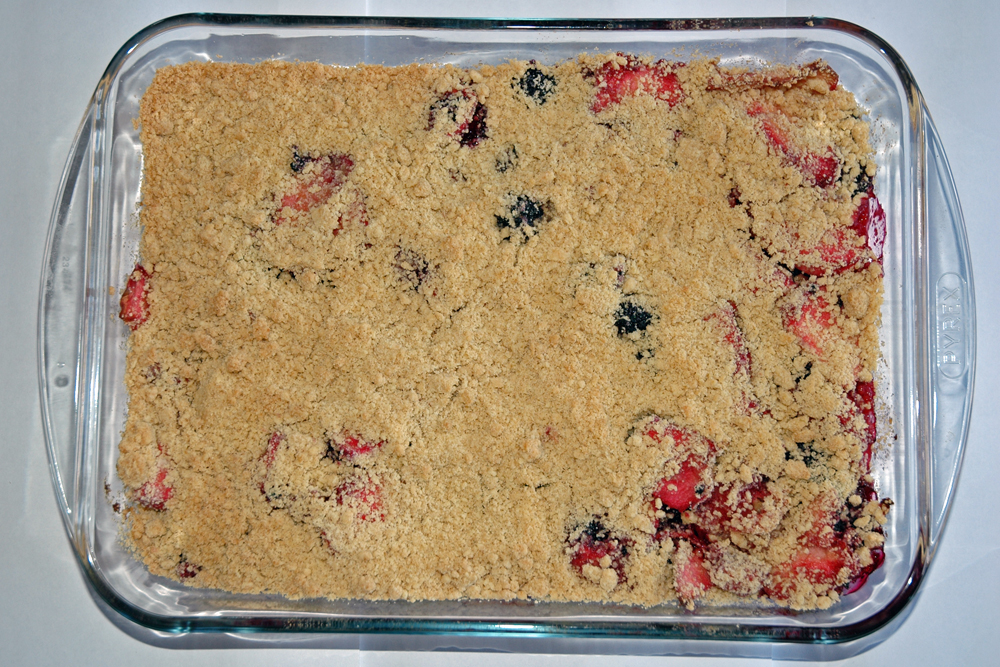
A blackberry and apple crumble

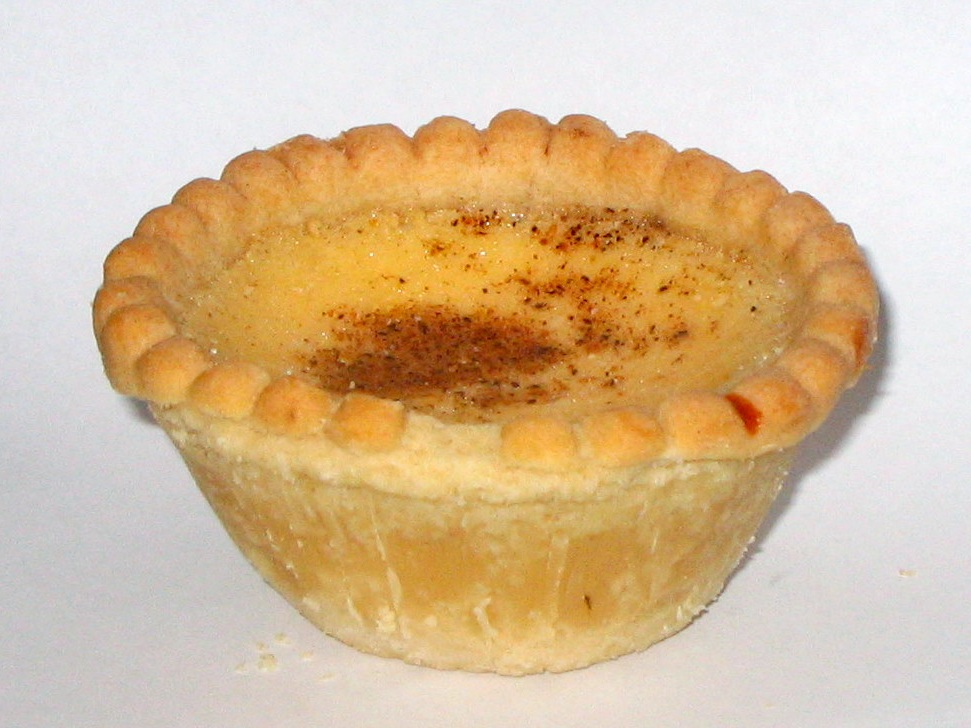
A custard tart is a pastry consisting of an outer pastry crust filled with egg custard and baked.

=== E ===
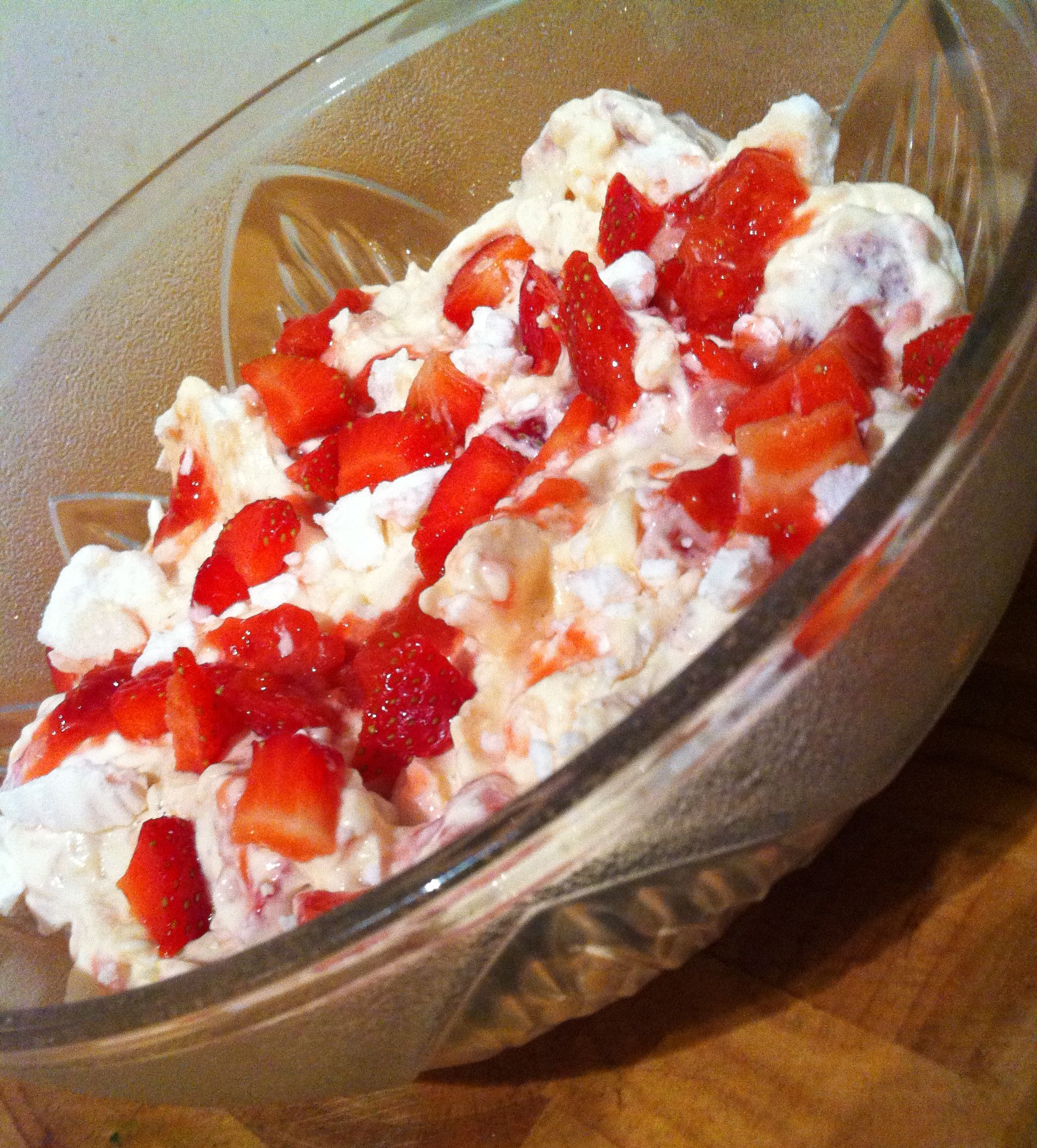
Eton mess

- Ecclefechan tart
- Eton mess
- Eve's pudding
- English cake

=== F ===
- Flapjack
- Flies graveyard
- Flummery
- Fruit fool
- Fudge

=== G ===
- Gypsy tart
- Gingerbread

=== H ===
- Hot cross bun

=== K ===
- Knickerbocker glory

=== L ===
- Lardy cake

=== M ===
- Manchester tart
- Maids of honour tart
- Mince pie
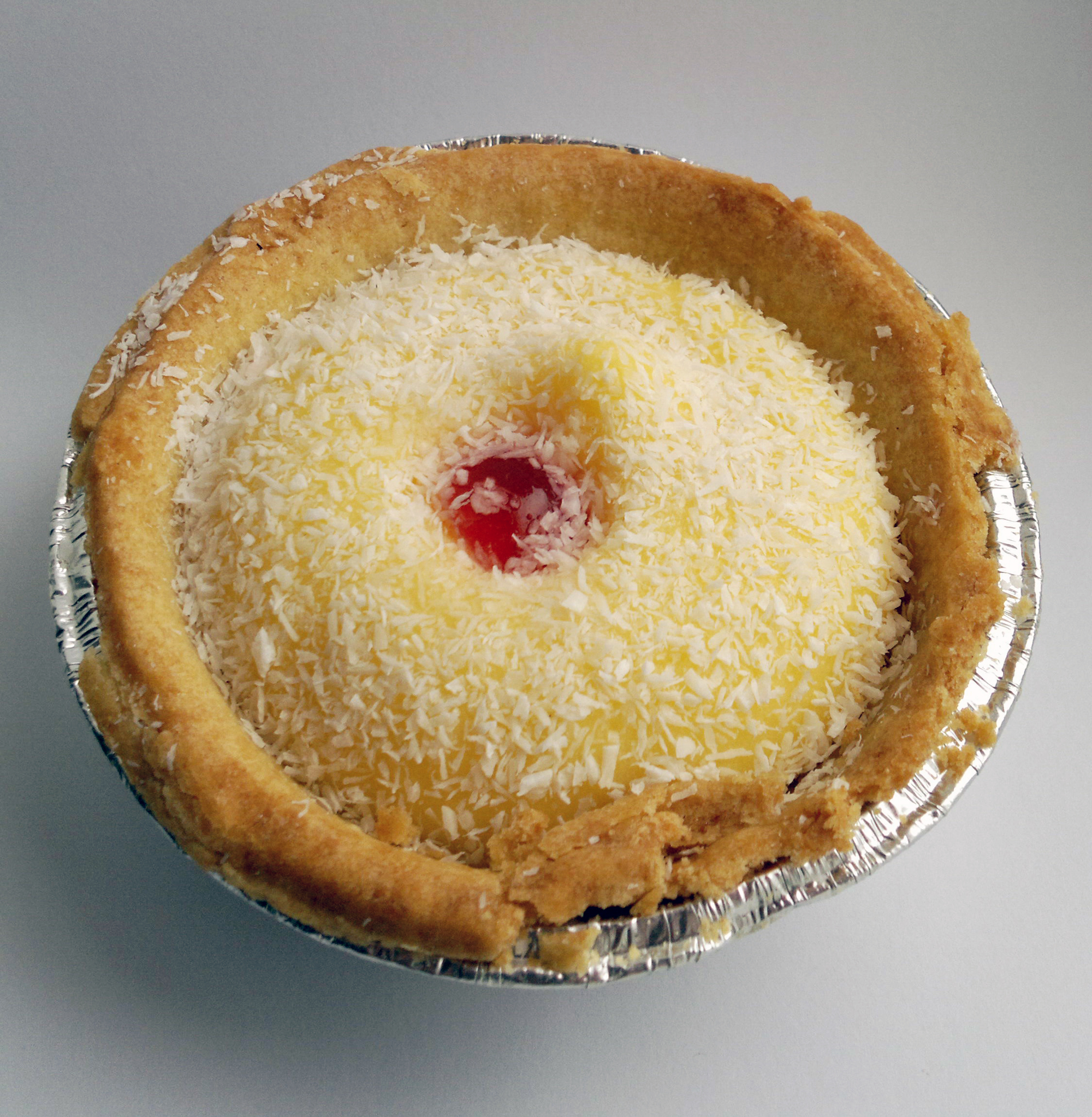
The Manchester tart is a traditional English baked tart consisting of a shortcrust pastry shell, spread with raspberry jam, covered with a custard filling and topped with flakes of coconut and a Maraschino cherry.

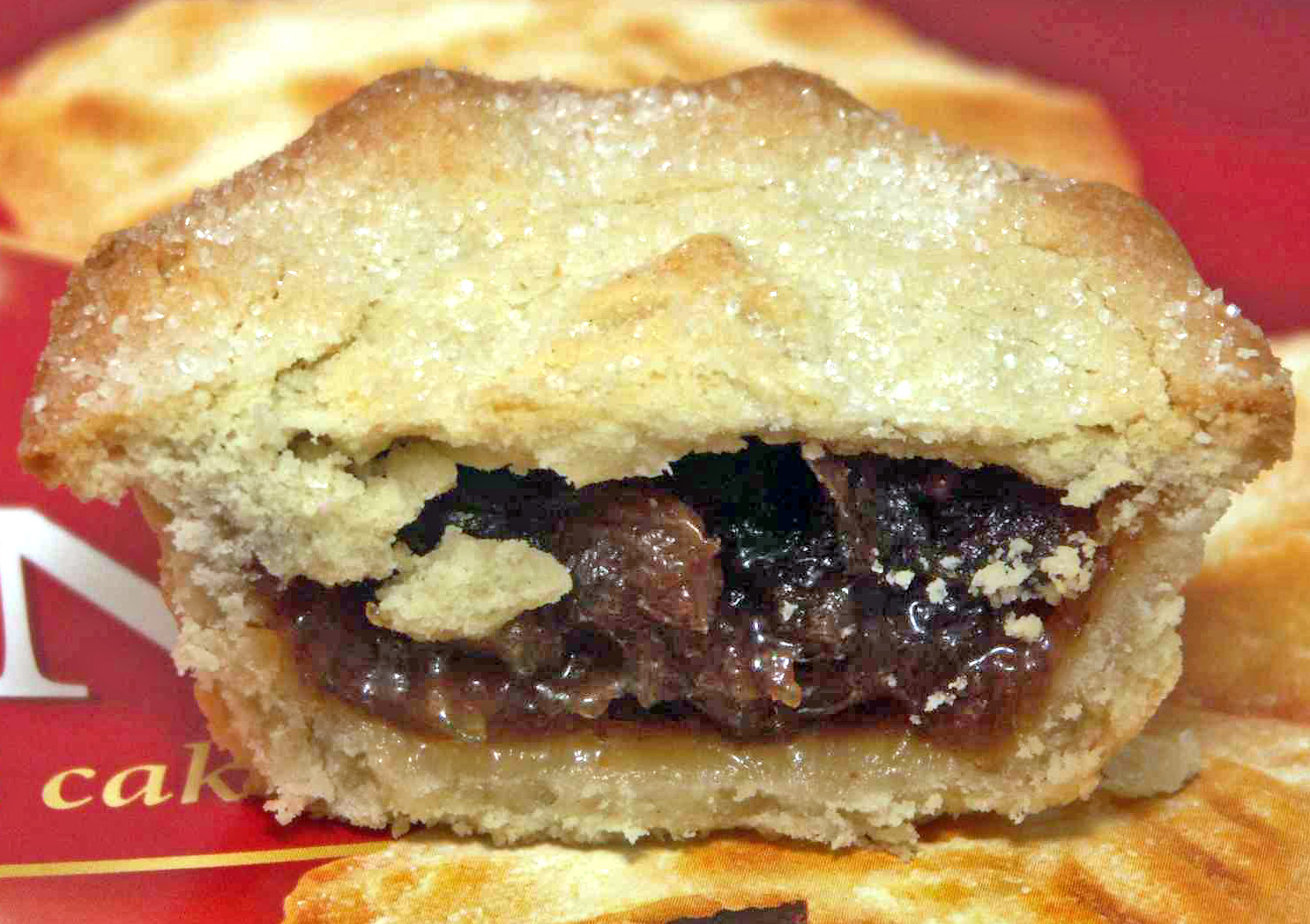
Mince pie is a small British fruit-based mincemeat sweet pie traditionally served during the Christmas season.

=== R ===
- Raspberry Ripple
- Rice pudding
- Rhubarb crumble
- Rhubarb pie
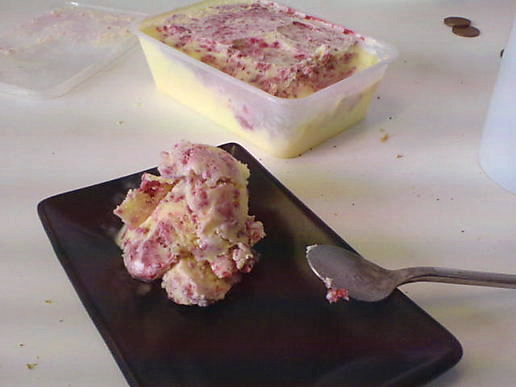
Raspberry ripple consists of raspberry syrup injected into vanilla ice cream.

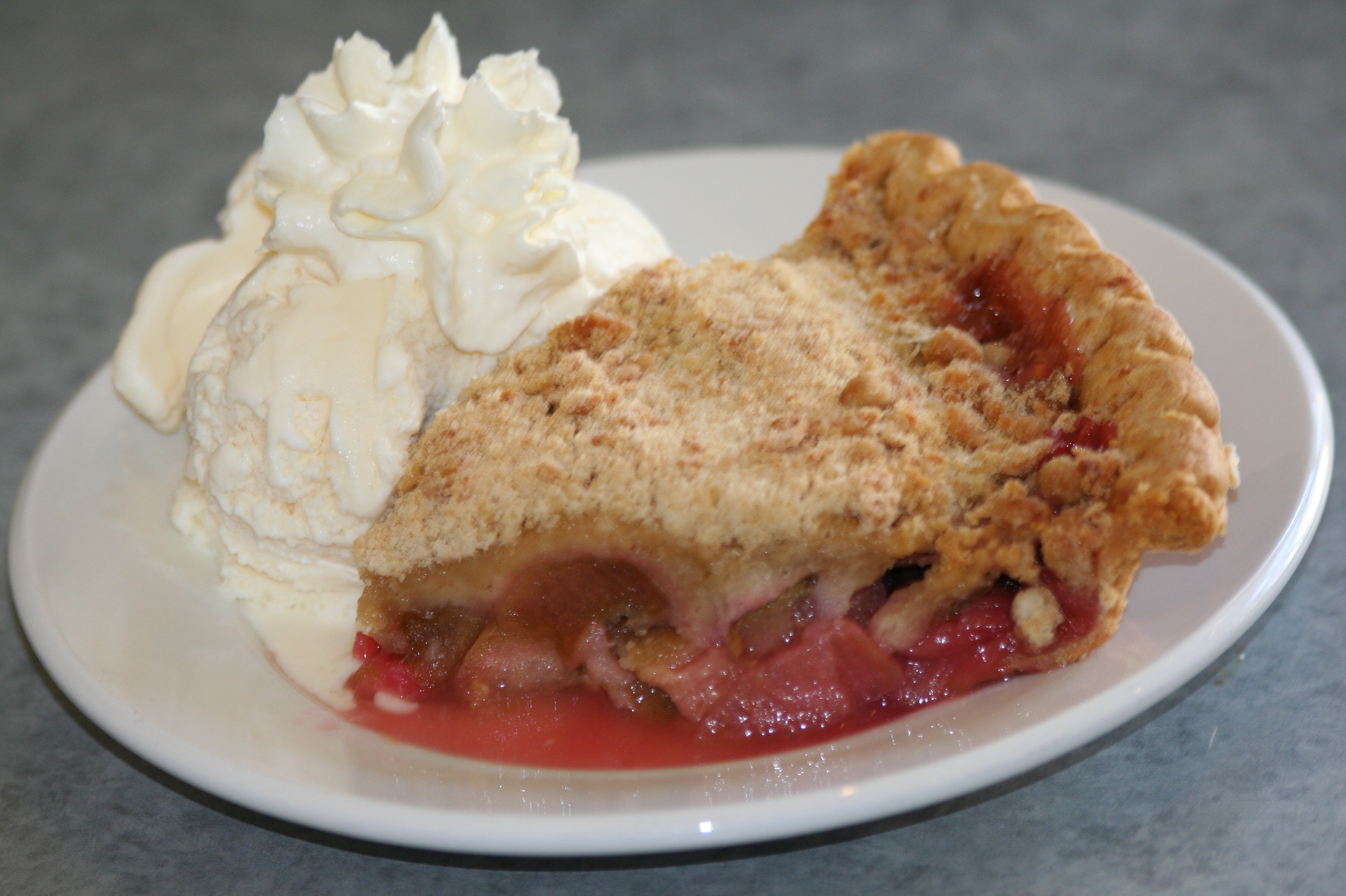
Rhubarb pie

=== S ===
- Scone
- Semolina pudding
- Shortcake
- Shrewsbury cake
- Spoom
- Spotted dick
- Strawberry rhubarb pie
- Syllabub
- Swiss roll
- Sponge cake
- Sticky toffee pudding
- Sussex pond pudding

=== T ===
- Tapioca pudding
- Treacle tart
- Trifle
- Teacake
- Tea

=== V ===
- Victoria sponge

=== Y ===
- Yorkshire Curd Tart
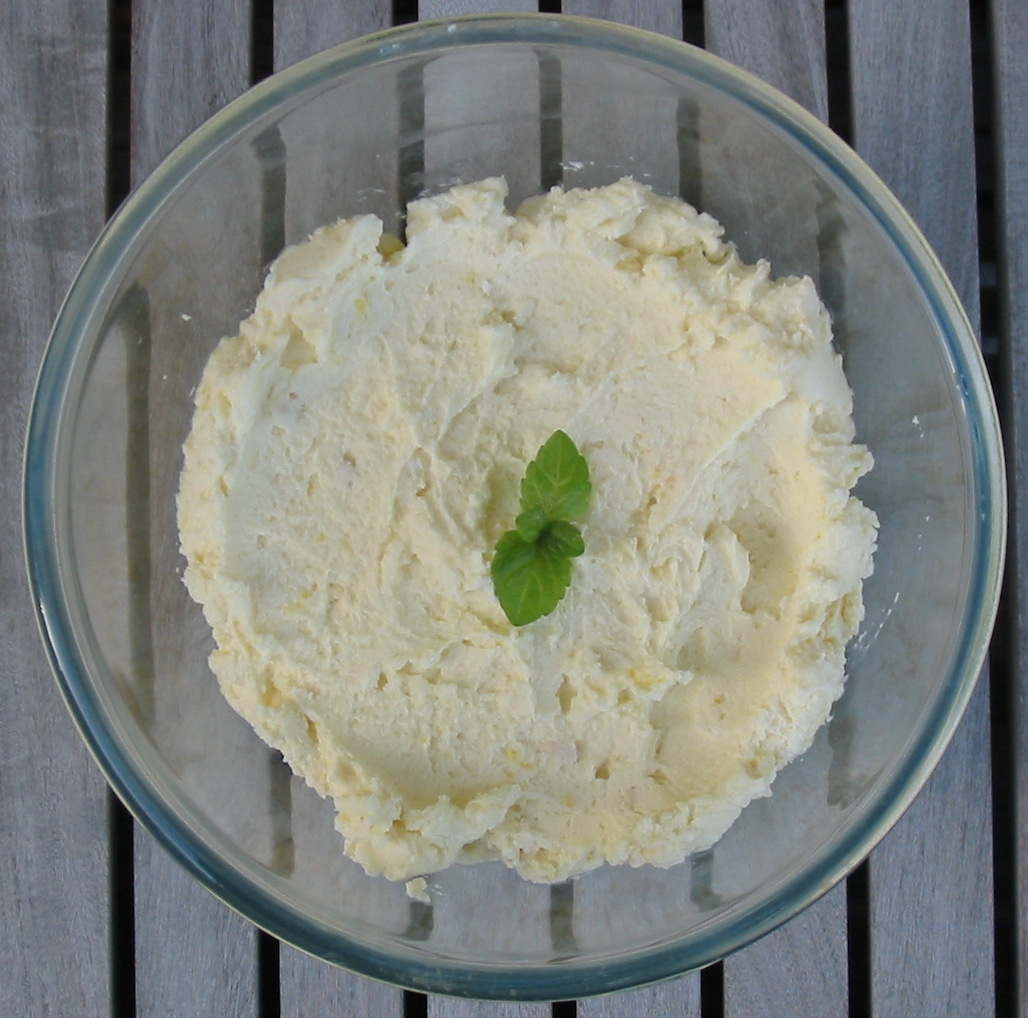
Syllabub is an English sweet dish described by the Oxford English Dictionary as "A drink or dish made of milk (freq. as drawn from the cow) or cream, curdled by the admixture of wine, cider, or other acid, and often sweetened and flavoured."

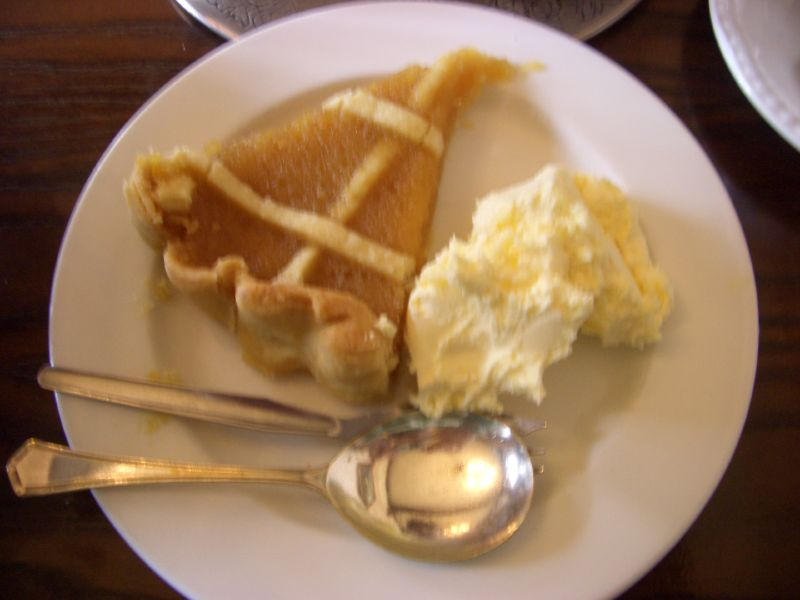
Treacle tarts are prepared using shortcrust pastry, with a thick filling made of golden syrup, also known as light treacle, breadcrumbs, and lemon juice or zest. Pictured is a treacle tart with clotted cream.

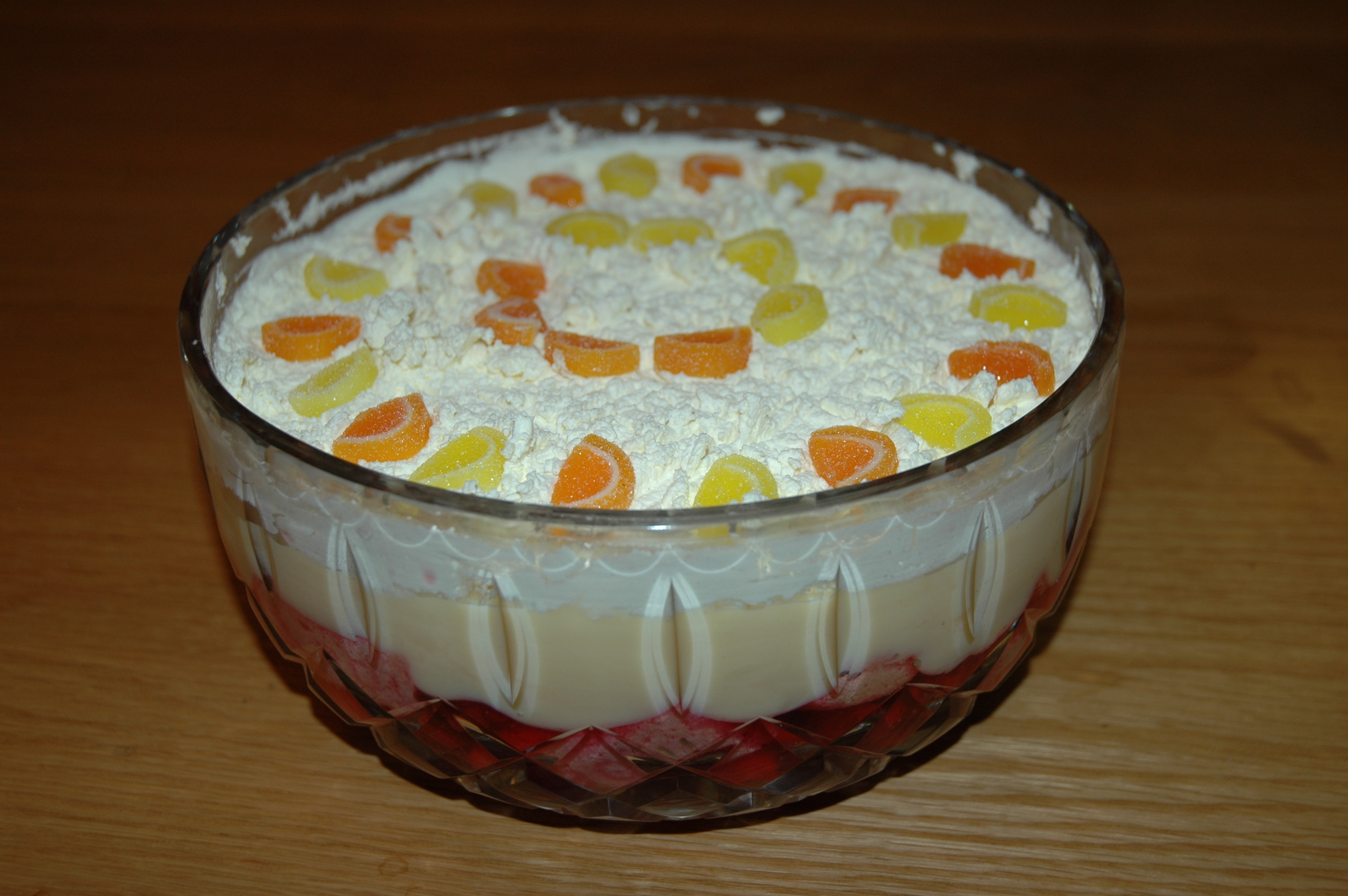
Trifle is an English dessert dish made from layered custard, fruit, sponge cake, fruit juice or jelly, and whipped cream.

== English cakes ==
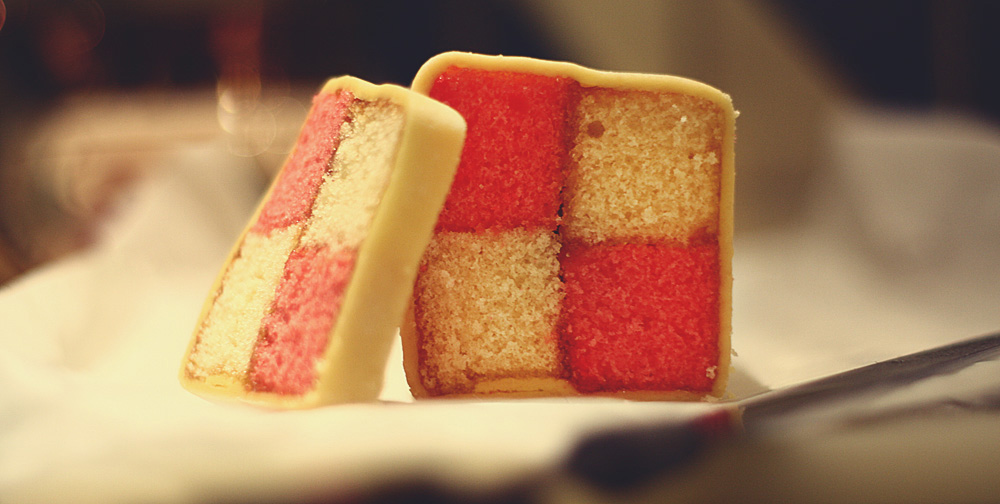
Battenberg cake is a light sponge cake.

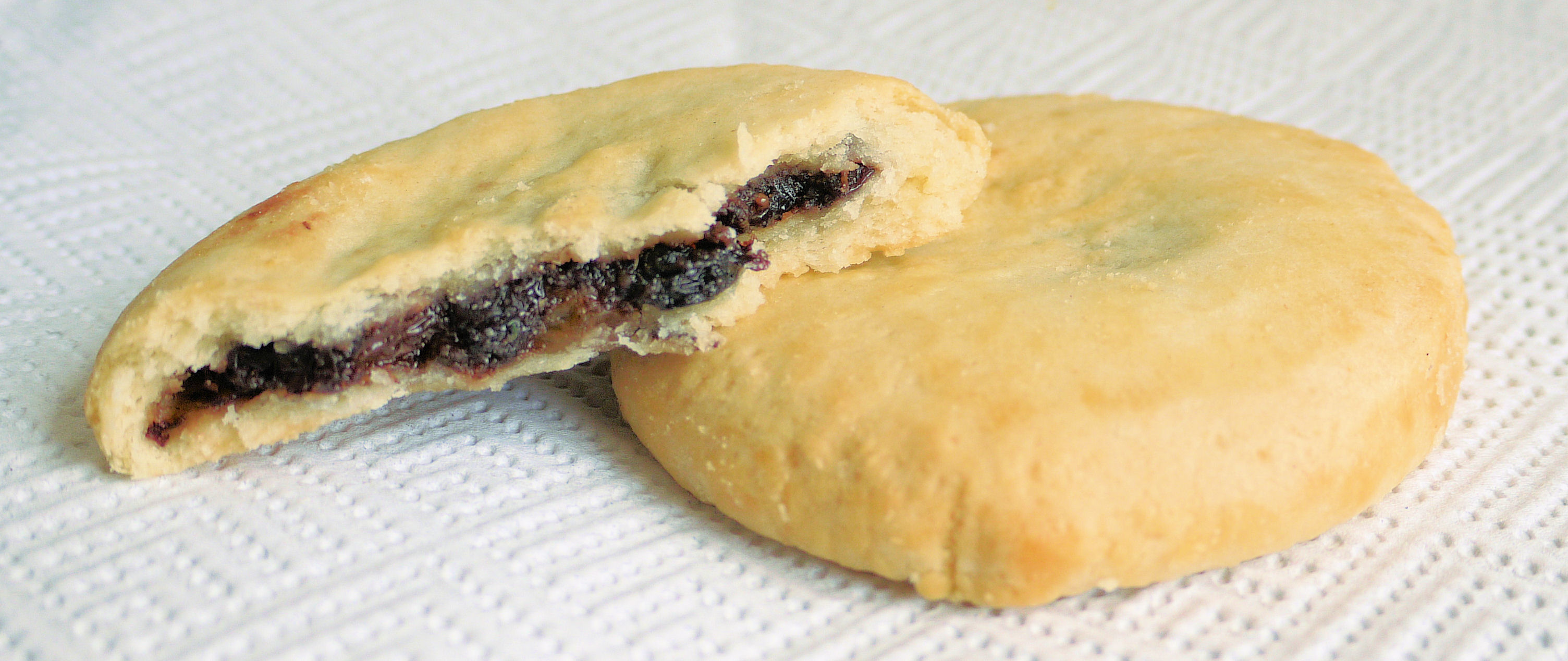
Chorley cakes are flattened, fruit-filled pastry cakes, traditionally associated with the town of Chorley in Lancashire, England.

- Angel cake
- Apple turnover
- Banbury cake
- Battenberg cake
- Caraway seed cake
- Carrot cake
- Chelsea bun
- Chorley cake
- Colin the Caterpillar
- Date and walnut loaf
- Eccles cake
- Fat rascal
- Jaffa Cakes
- Lardy cake
- Madeira cake
- Malt loaf
- Parkin
- Pink Wafer
- Pound cake
- Rock cake
- Simnel cake
- Sponge cake
- Strawberry shortcake (dessert)
- Strawberry tart
- Tottenham cake
- Tipsy cake
- Welsh cake
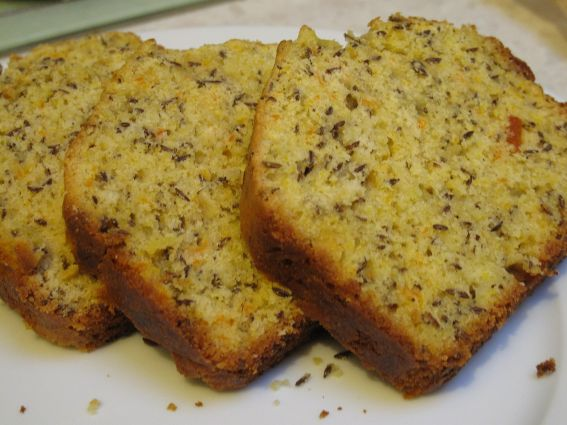
Caraway seed cake is a traditional British cake flavoured with caraway or other flavourful seeds. Caraway seeds have been long used in British cookery.

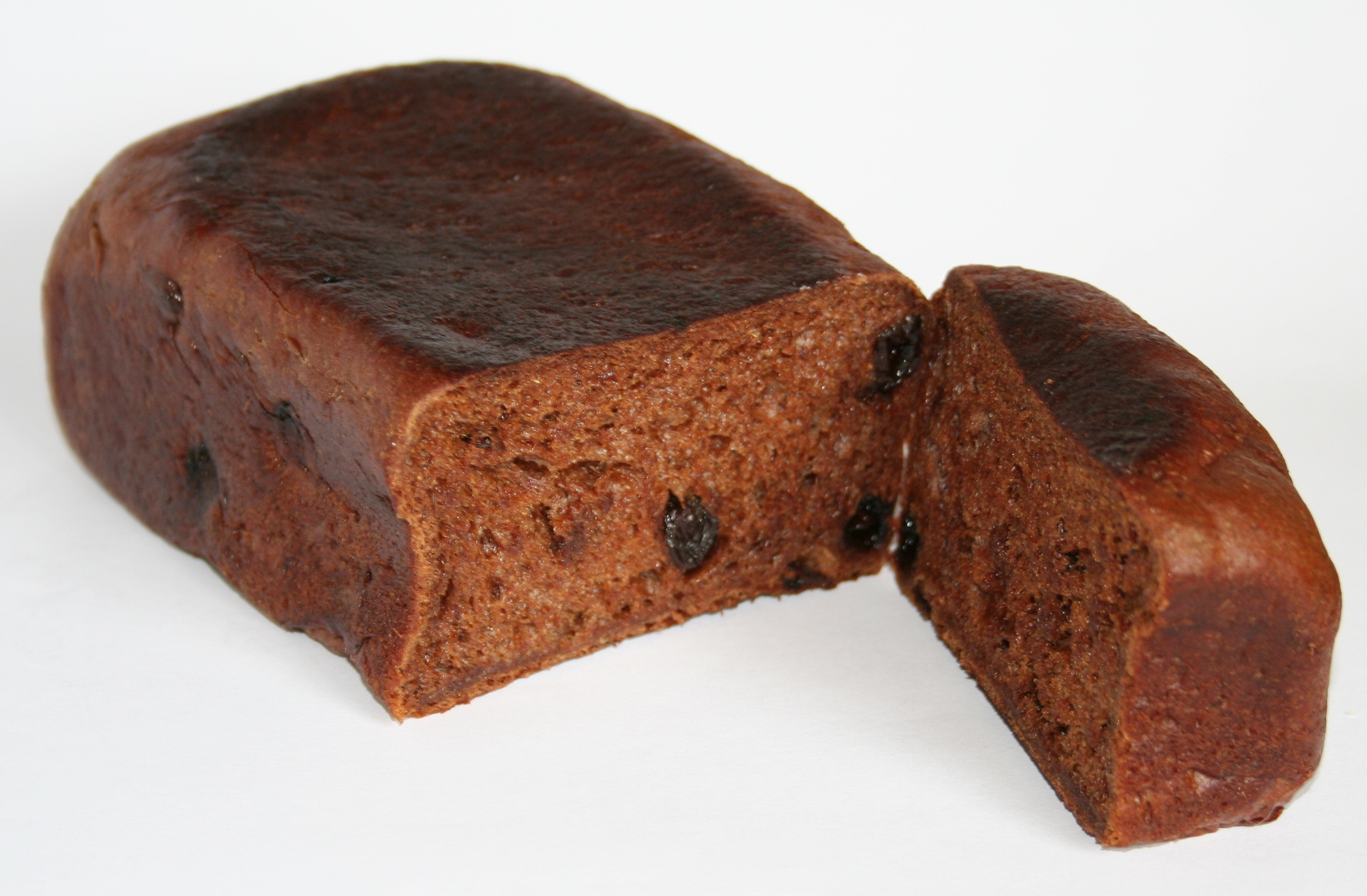
Malt loaf is a common snack food in the United Kingdom.

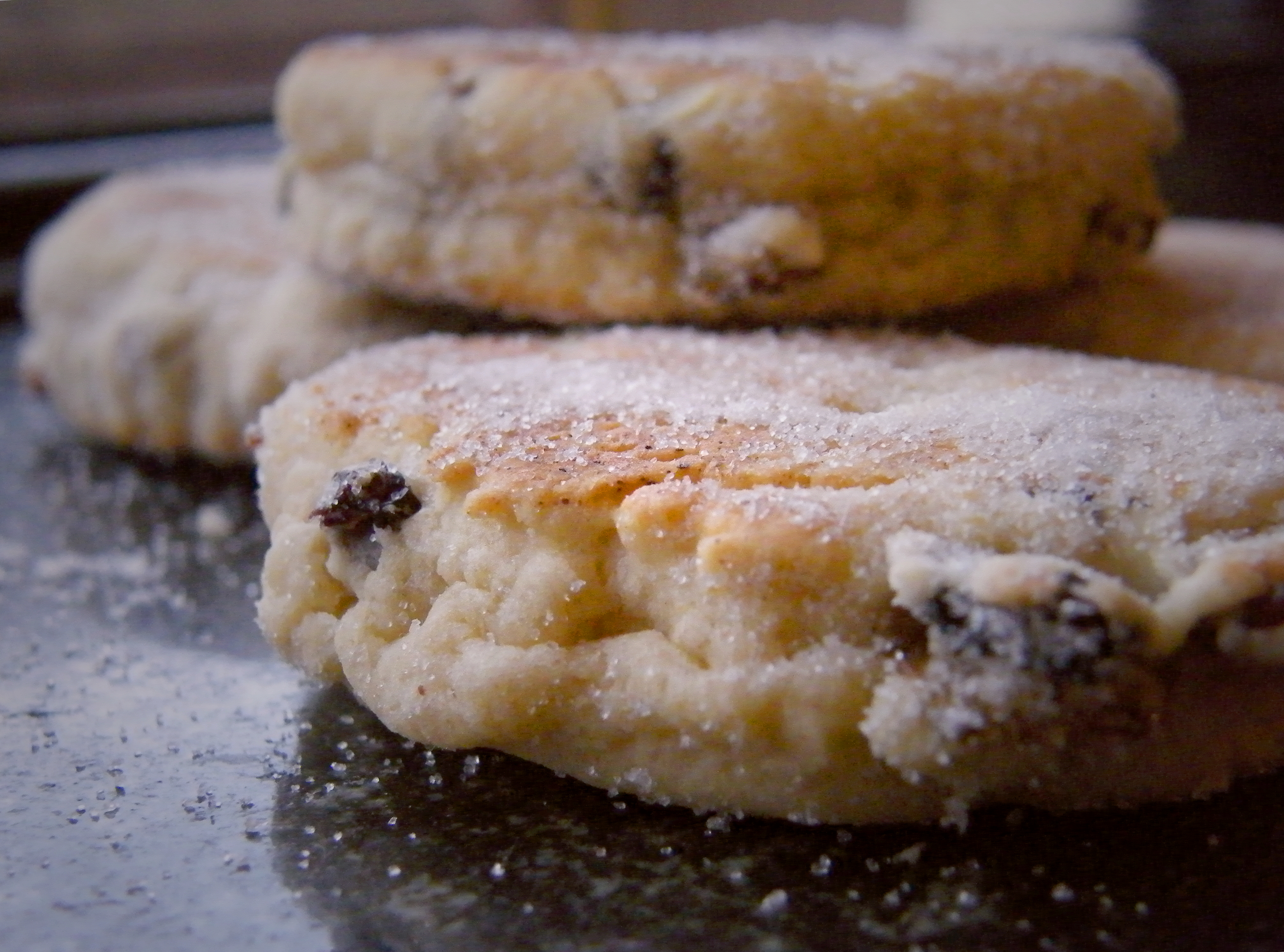
Welsh cakes are made from flour, sultanas, raisins, and/or currants, and may also include such spices as cinnamon and nutmeg.

== English puddings ==
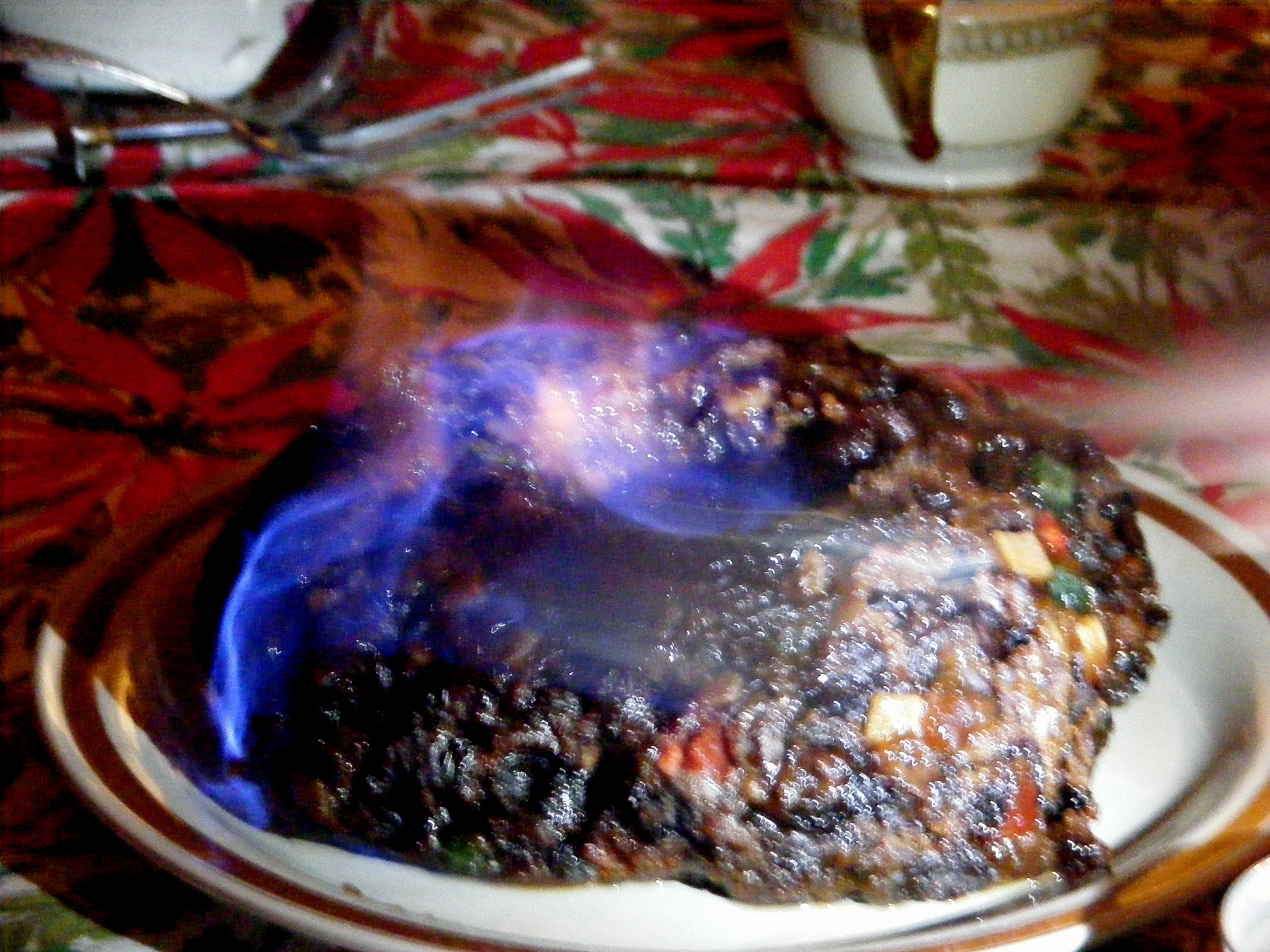
Figgy pudding with flaming brandy

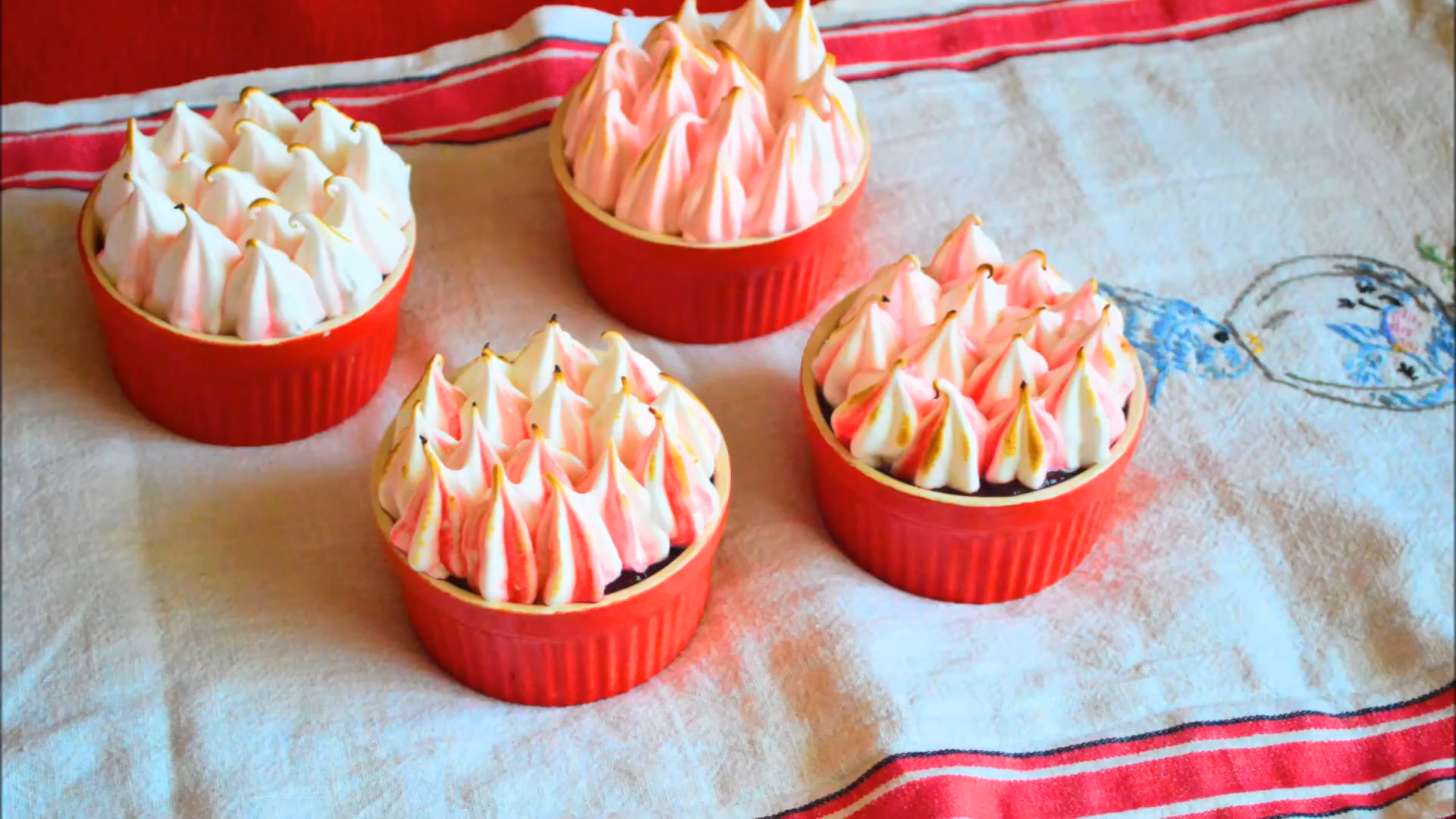
4 Queen of Puddings. The dish is a baked, breadcrumb-thickened mixture, spread with jam and topped with meringue. Variants of puddings made with breadcrumbs boiled with milk can be found dating back to the seventeenth century.

- Bread and butter pudding
- Bread pudding
- Cabinet pudding
- Christmas pudding
- Eve's pudding
- Figgy pudding
- Fruit hat
- Jam Roly-Poly
- Malvern pudding
- Queen of Puddings
- Rice pudding
- Spotted dick
- Sticky toffee pudding
- Suet pudding
- Summer pudding
- Sussex pond pudding
- Treacle sponge pudding
- Waldorf pudding

== Scottish desserts ==
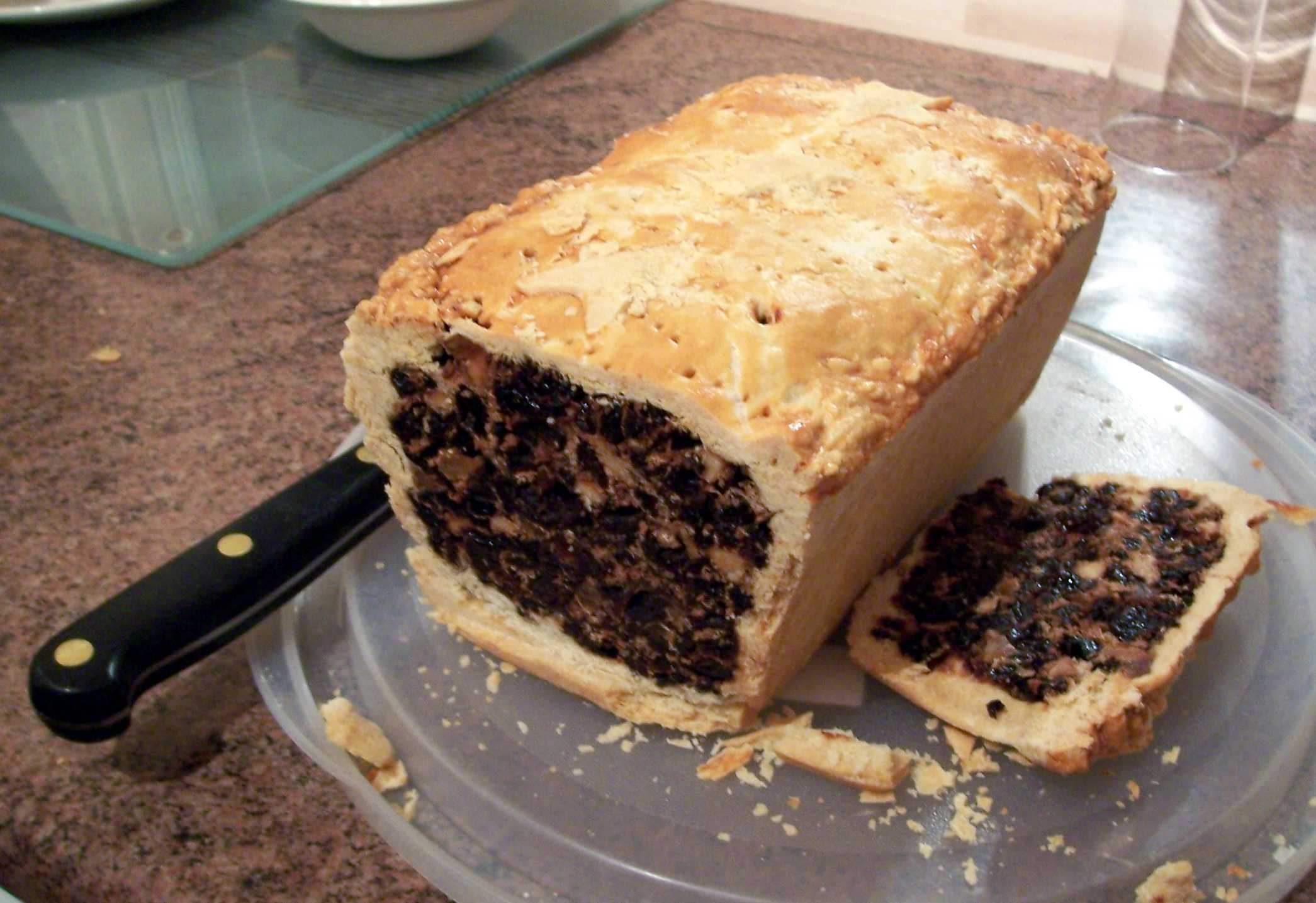
The black bun is a type of fruit cake completely covered with pastry. It is Scottish in origin, originally eaten on Twelfth Night but now enjoyed at Hogmanay.

- Abernethy biscuit
- Black bun
- Clootie dumpling
- Cranachan
- Deep-fried Mars bar
- Dundee cake
- Empire biscuit
- Fudge doughnut
- Penguin
- Tipsy laird
- Scottish cake
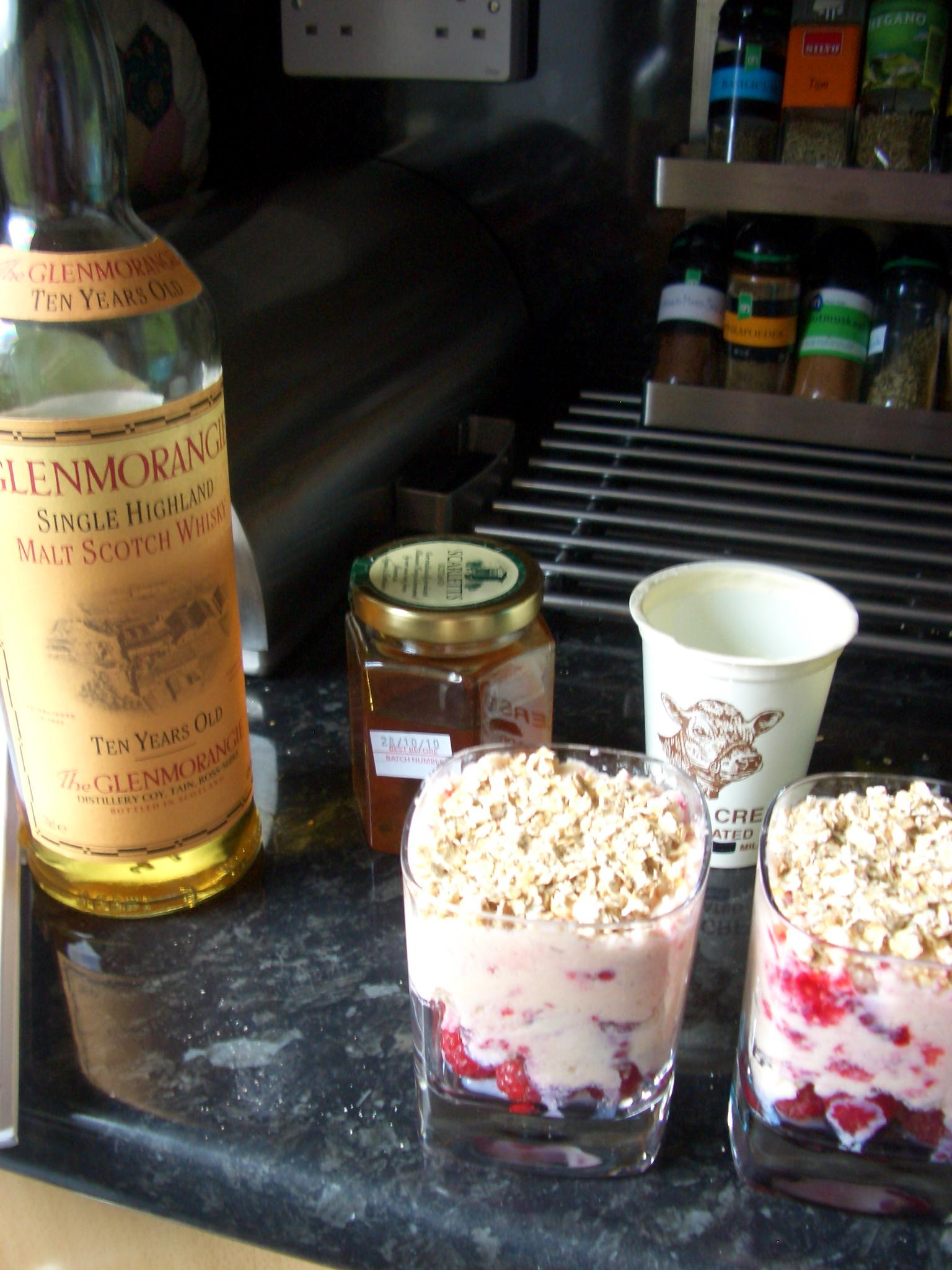
A cranachan is a traditional Scottish dessert.

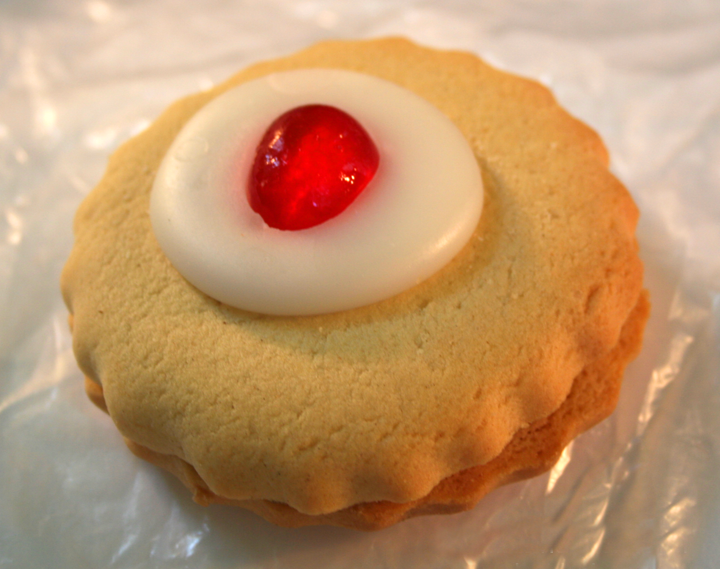
Empire biscuits are a sweet biscuit popular in the United Kingdom, particularly Scotland, and other Commonwealth countries.

== Commercial products ==
- Vienetta

== See also ==
- British cuisine
- English cuisine
- Scottish cuisine
- Welsh cuisine
- List of desserts
