= Mary Norwak =

British food writer

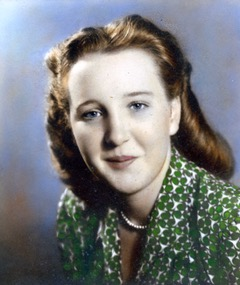
Mary Norwak

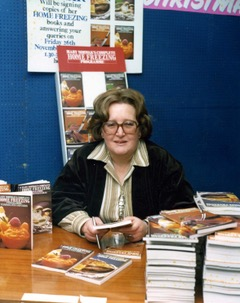
Signing cookbooks

Mary Norwak (née Stock) (20 January 1929 – 5 October 2010) was a Norfolk-based British food writer who specialized in regional British food. She was educated at Haberdashers' Aske's School for Girls. She published more than 100 cookbooks. Her best-known work, English Puddings: Sweet and Savoury, published in 1981, remains a standard reference on the subject.

== Selected publications ==
- English Puddings: Sweet and Savoury. London: HarperCollins. 1981. ISBN 0-7134-1927-X.

== See also ==
- List of British desserts
