= Seed cake =

Seed cake may refer to:

- Bush bread
- Caraway seed cake
- Press cake, residue left after pressing seeds to extract oil.
