= Angel cake =

British layer cake

Angel Cake
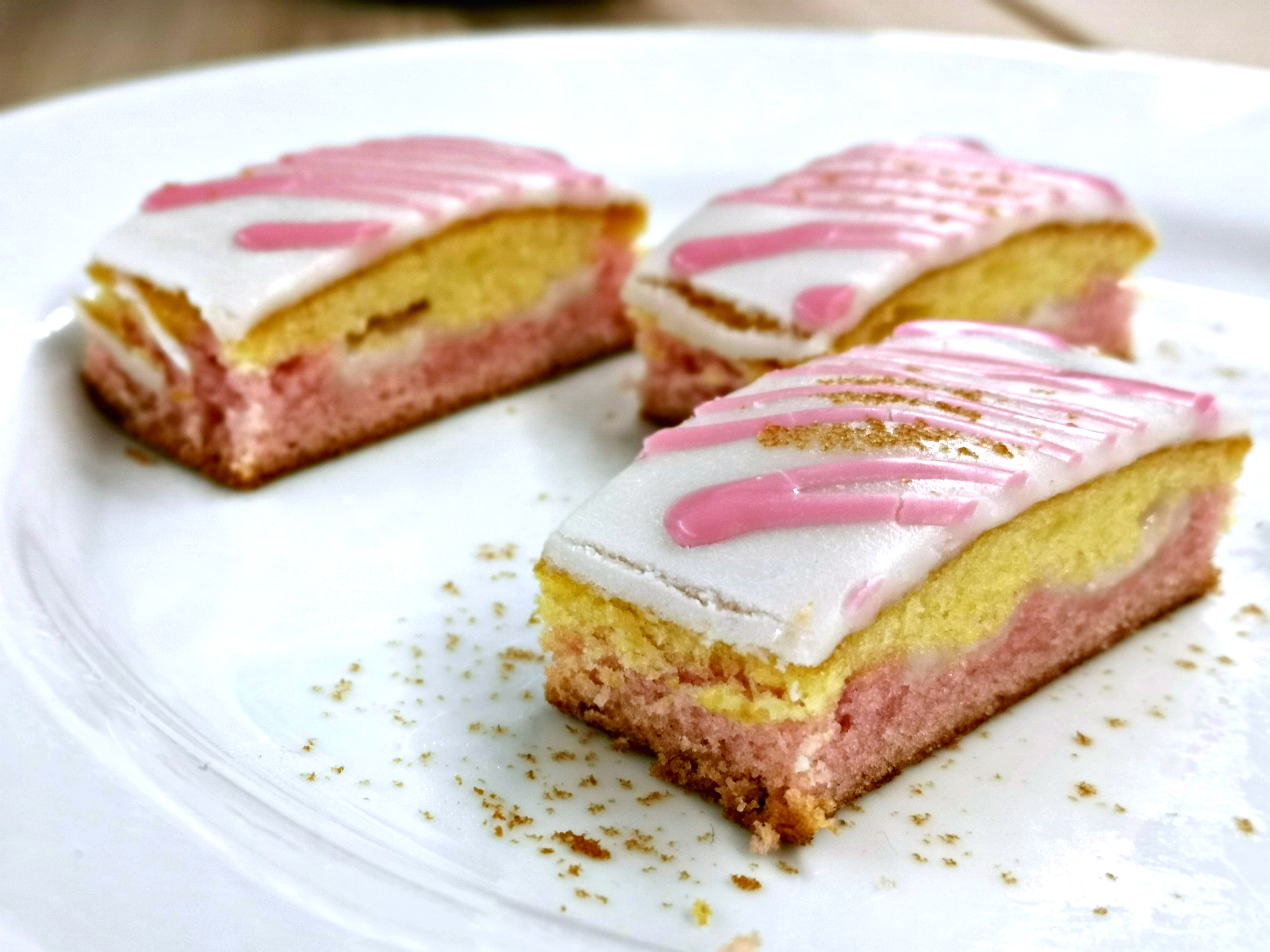
- Angel Slices in the style of Mr Kipling Angel Slices
- Alternative names: Angel Layer Cake, Angel Slice
- Type: Layer cake
- Place of origin: England
- Main ingredients: Flour, sugar, eggs, butter, icing, vanilla extract, yellow and pink or red food colouring

Angel Cake (or Angel Layer Cake) is a three-layered, loaf-shaped sponge cake. Its main ingredients are butter, sugar, eggs, flour, food colouring, and buttercream icing. White icing may be spread on top if wanted. It is normally served in rectangular slices.

First appearing in England in the 1950s, it has become a popular cake sold in supermarkets across the United Kingdom, and is also sold in Ireland, Australia, New Zealand, and North America.

== Description ==
Angel Cake is a coloured, three-layered, loaf-shaped vanilla sponge cake. Angel Cake's traditional ingredients are butter or margarine, sugar, eggs, flour, vanilla extract or essence, and yellow and pink or red food colouring, with buttercream icing between each layer. White icing may be spread on top if wanted. The colours of the layers can be in any order. It is normally served in rectangular slices and eaten by itself. These slices may be referred to as Angel Slices. It is a sweet, light, and soft cake.

The biggest difference in ingredients between UK Angel Cake and US Angel Food Cake is that the US cake does not use butter and only uses the whites of the eggs, not the whole egg.

== History ==
The exact origin of Angel Cake is not known. Before the 1950s, recipes for "Angel Cake" in the UK were for US Angel Food Cake, using egg whites and no butter. In 1953, the derationing of common cooking ingredients such as butter, sugar, cream, and eggs in the UK resulted in the spread of supermarket packaged desserts and a greater variety of recipes being created in the 50s and 60s, such as the Arctic Roll, Angel Delight, and Millionaire's Shortbread.

The first mention of "Angel Layer Cake" with pink, white, and yellow coloured layers is in a Staffordshire newspaper in 1954. From then on, "Angel Layer Cake" had begun being sold by supermarkets across the UK, spreading in the 1960s. Popular supermarkets that sell or have sold their own store brand Angel Cake were David Greig, Sainsbury's, M&S, Tesco, Morrisons, and Asda.

Nowadays, Angel Cake is a popular sweet cake in Britain, usually eaten as a lunch box snack at school.

Mr Kipling Angel Slices are an especially popular version and are sold not just in the UK, but also in Ireland, Australia, New Zealand, and North America. Mr Kipling Angel Slices are different from traditional Angel Cake recipes, with Kipling's version being smaller, having only two layers, and having pink icing drizzled on top of the white icing.

== In Pop Culture ==
Angel Cake slices were featured as a recipe by Prue Leith in episode 1, season 10 of The Great British Bake Off.

== See also ==
- Angel Food Cake
- British desserts
- List of cakes
- List of desserts
