= Thomas Carlyle's Birthplace =

Birthplace of Thomas Carlyle

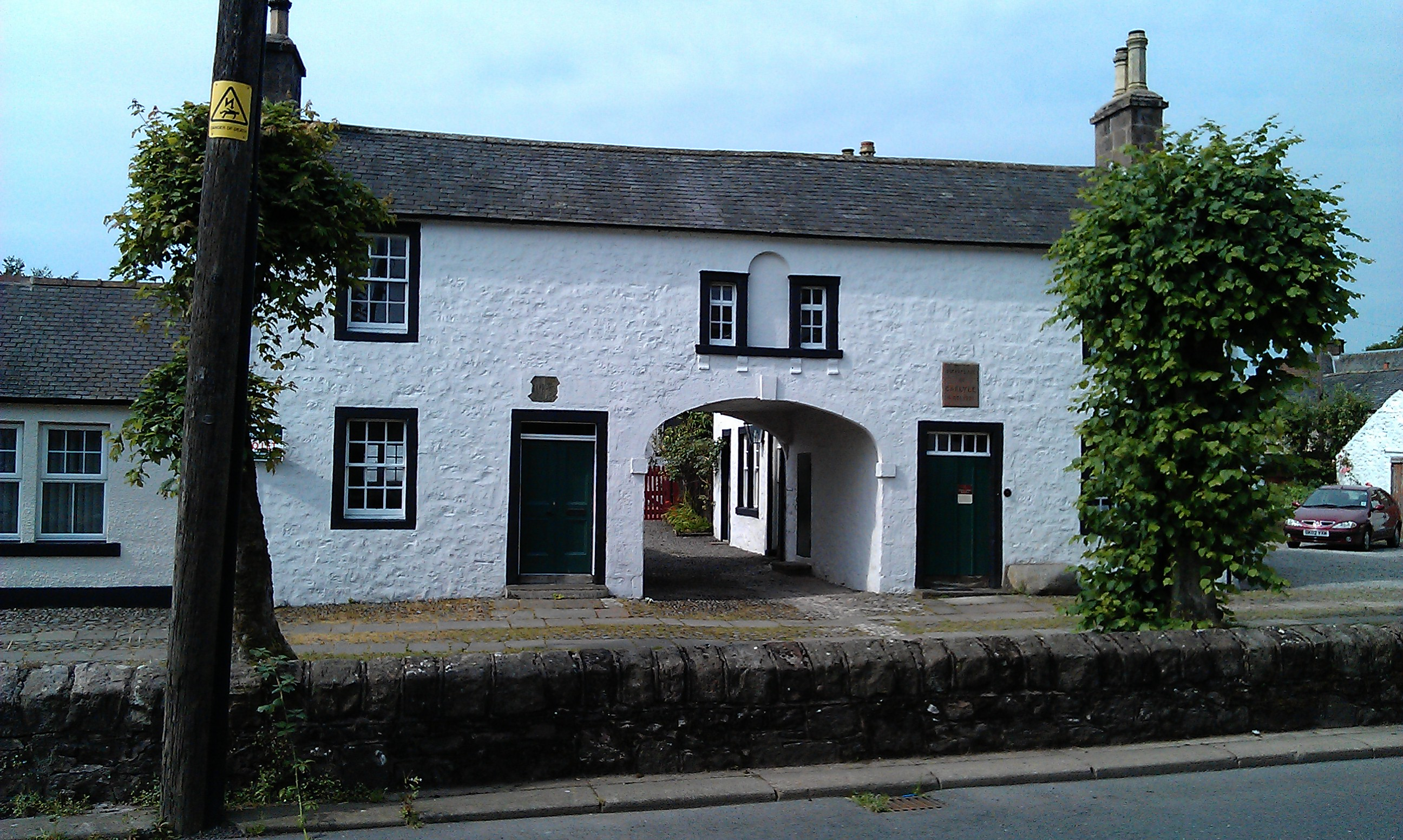
- Thomas Carlyle's Birthplace in 2014
- Location: Ecclefechan, Dumfries and Galloway
- Coordinates: 55°03′33″N 3°15′51″W

Listed Building – Grade A
- Official name: Arched House including Carlyle's Birthplace
- Designated: 3 September 1971
- Reference no.: LB10065

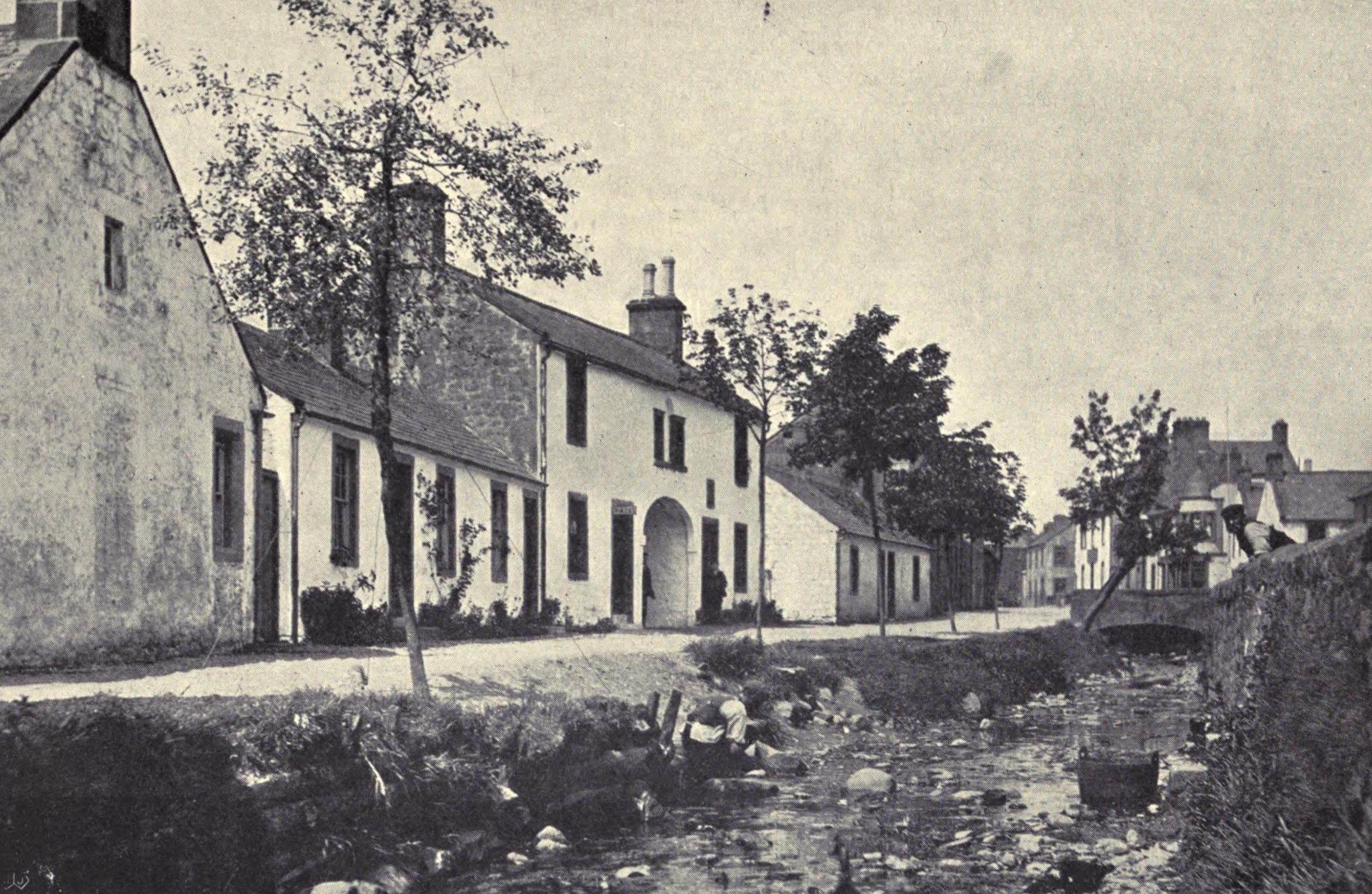
The house before 1904

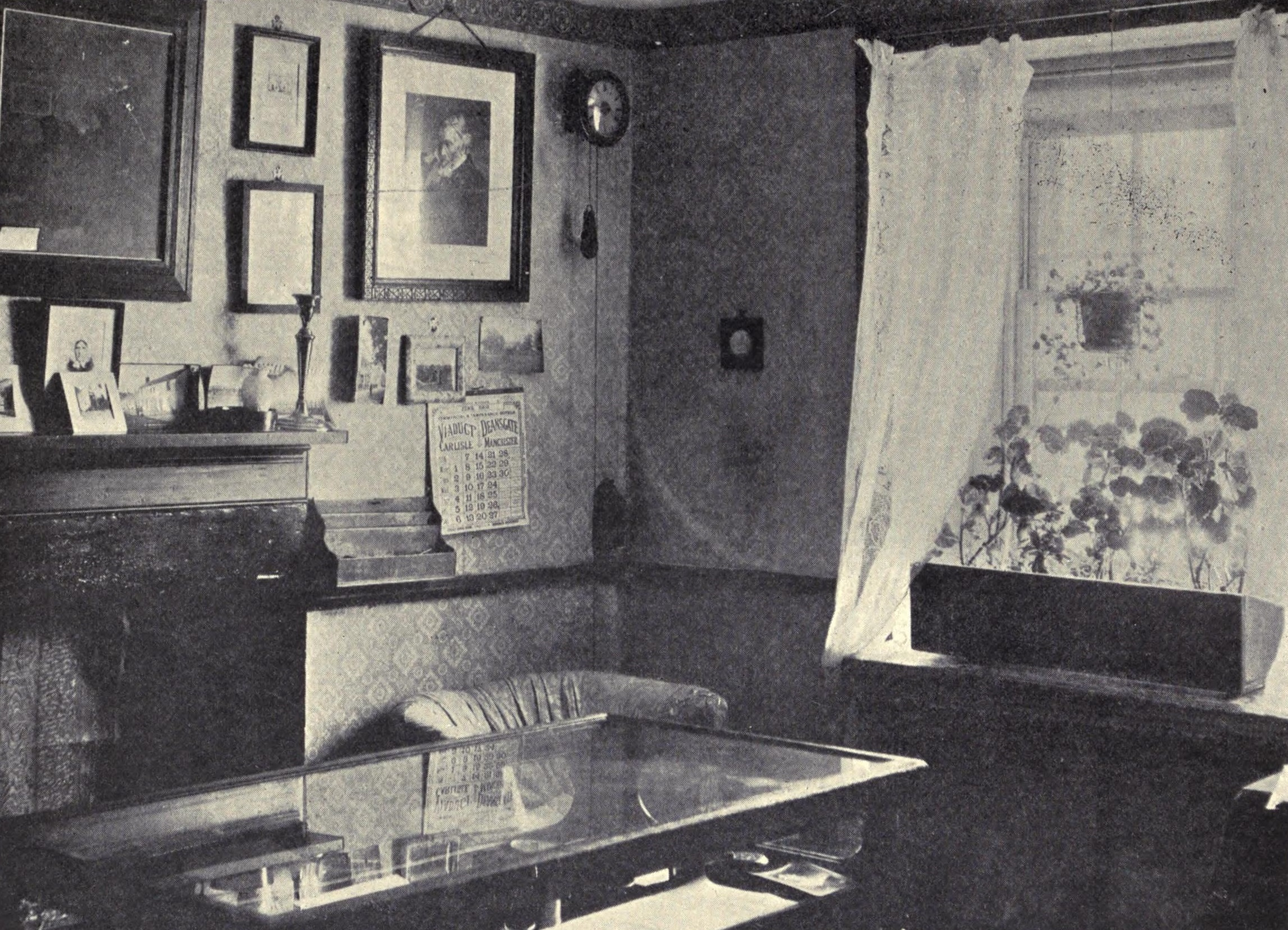
Interior

Thomas Carlyle's Birthplace is a house in Ecclefechan, Dumfries and Galloway, Scotland, in which Thomas Carlyle, who was to become a pre-eminent man of letters, was born in 1795.

The house was built in 1791 by Carlyle's father James and James' brothers John and Tom, stonemasons all. It is owned by the National Trust for Scotland, registered as a Category A listed building. Architecturally, the home exemplifies 18th-century Scottish Vernacular. It first opened to the public in 1881 and remains much as it was then. Many of Carlyle's belongings are housed along with a collection of portraits and photographs relating to his life. Carlyle lived here with his brother John Aitken Carlyle who would go on to translate Dante's Inferno into English (1849). It was from here that Thomas Carlyle walked nearly one hundred miles in order to attend the University of Edinburgh at the age of 13, intending for the ministry.
