= Bondost =

Swedish cow's-milk cheese

- Country of origin: Sweden
- Source of milk: Cows
- Texture: Firm
- Aging time: 6–8 weeks

Bondost (sometimes spelled bond-ost, Swedish for "farmer cheese") is a Swedish cheese, also made in the United States, chiefly in New York.

This cow's-milk cheese is cylindrical in shape, about 13 cm (5.1 in) across and 9 cm (3.5 in) high. After the milk (either raw or pasteurized) is curdled, heated, cut, salted, stirred, pressed into forms, and immersed into brine for a day or two, the new cheese is ripened for six to eight weeks. Sometimes bondost is spiced with cumin or caraway seeds, which are incorporated into the curd just before it is molded.

It has a firm texture providing a mild tasting cheese that can be served as an appetizer or for snacking. When produced, it is brine cured, allowed to dry, and ready to serve in approximately 2 months. Several varieties are cured for 1 to 2 days, while the most flavorful varieties are cured for several weeks.

== See also ==
- List of cheeses
