= Ecclefechan =

Coordinates: 55.0615°N 3.2642°W

Ecclefechan: Scottish Gaelic: Eaglais Fheichein; Fechan
- Location within Dumfries and Galloway
- Population: 880 (2020)
- OS grid reference: NY193748
- Council area: Dumfries and Galloway
- Lieutenancy area: Dumfries
- Country: Scotland
- Sovereign state: United Kingdom
- Post town: LOCKERBIE
- Postcode district: DG11
- Dialling code: 01576
- Police: Scotland
- Fire: Scottish
- Ambulance: Scottish
- UK Parliament: Dumfriesshire, Clydesdale and Tweeddale
- Scottish Parliament: Dumfriesshire

Ecclefechan (Scottish Gaelic: Eaglais Fheichein) is a village located in Dumfries and Galloway in the south of Scotland.

The village is famous for being the birthplace of Thomas Carlyle.

Ecclefechan lies in the valley of the Mein Water, a tributary of the River Annan, 6 1/4 miles (10 kilometres) south of Lockerbie, five miles (eight kilometres) north of Annan and eight miles (thirteen kilometres) northwest of the English border. The A74(M) motorway runs immediately north of the village and Junction 19 is just northwest of the village.

The High Street of the village has a burn which runs through a culvert below it. This culvert was constructed in 1875 by Dr George Arnott at his own expense.

== Etymology ==
The name Ecclefechan was recorded as Egilfeichane in 1507, and is of Brittonic origin. The first element is eglẹ:s, meaning "a church" (cf. Welsh eglwys). The second element is the equivalent of Welsh fechan, meaning "little". Comparable Welsh toponyms include Eglwysfach and Llanfechan.

A lesser likelihood is that the name commemorates Féchín of Fore, a 7th-century Irish saint.

== Governance ==
Ecclefechan is in the parliamentary constituency of Dumfriesshire, Clydesdale and Tweeddale, David Mundell is the current Conservative Party Member of Parliament (MP).

Ecclefechan is part of the South Scotland region in the Scottish Parliament, being in the constituency of Dumfriesshire. Oliver Mundell of the Conservatives is the Member of the Scottish Parliament (MSP).

Before Brexit for the European Parliament its residents voted to elect Members of the European Parliament (MEPs) for the Scotland constituency.

For local government purposes, it belongs to the Annandale East and Eskdale Ward of the Dumfries and Galloway Council Area. The village does not have its own parish council.

== Places of interest ==
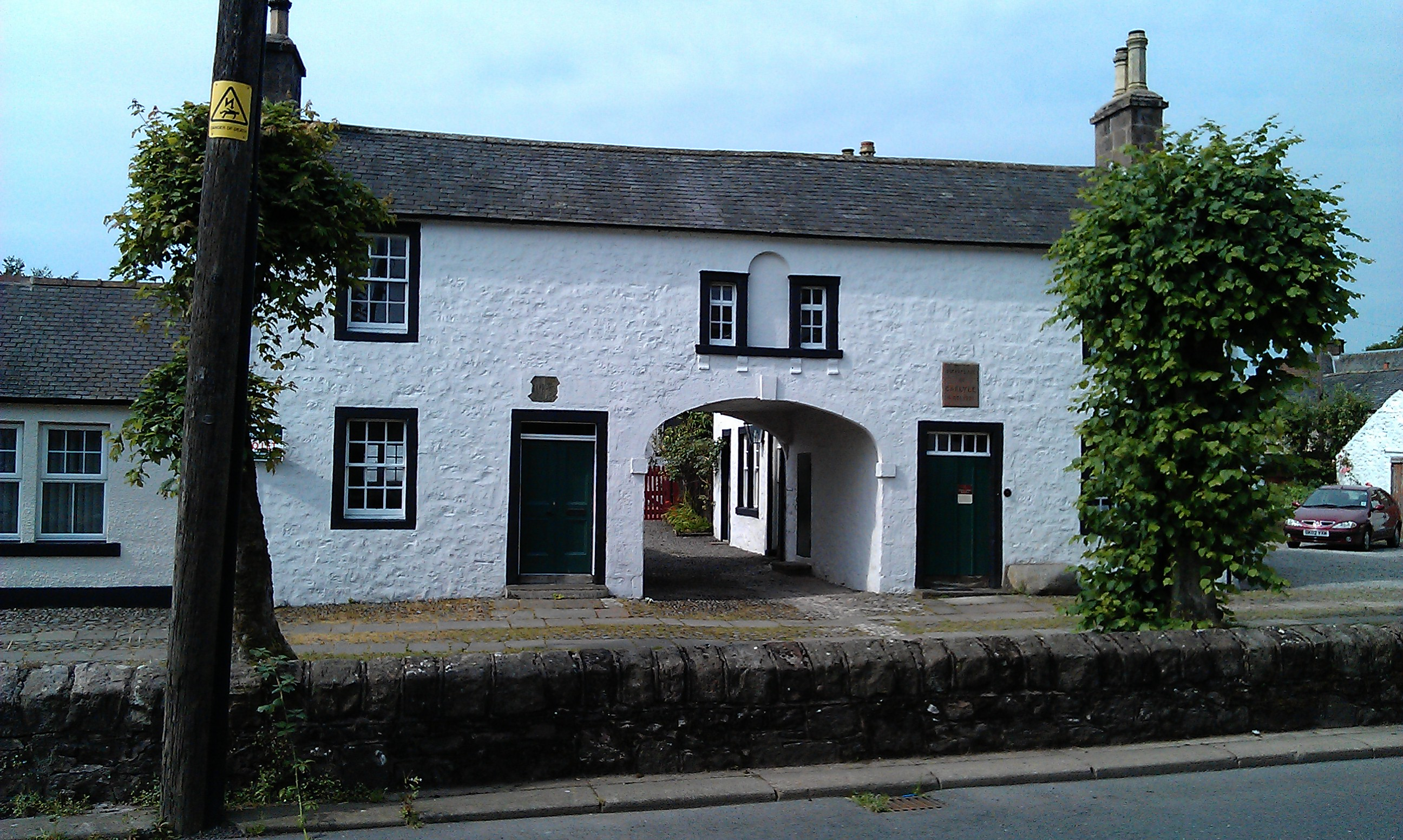
Thomas Carlyle's Birthplace

Thomas Carlyle's birthplace 'The Arched House' is a tourist attraction and has been maintained by the National Trust for Scotland since 1936. According to letters from Carlyle written to Charles Gavin Duffy in the summer of 1846, his mother's farm in Ecclefechan was at that time located in Scotsbrig. From Scotsbrig, Carlyle watched the construction of the Caledonian Railway and complained to Duffy of Ecclefechan's potato blight, and the abundance of railway navvies from Lancashire, Ireland, and Yorkshire, finding his visit home disturbed by the "black potato-fields, and all roads and lanes overrun with drunken navvies". Carlyle commented "I find that the Irish are best on point of behaviour" because they sent their money home to their families and did not spend it on whiskey.

Ecclefechan lies at the foot of Burnswark Hill, a large Caledonian hillfort besieged by the Roman army in 140 AD. Its flat top dominates the horizon.

Hoddom Castle is located two miles (three kilometres) from the village centre.

Not far from the village is the Robgill Tower, built by the Clan Irvine. In the 1880s, an adjoining home was built. The tower was one of a number of structures built along the border as protection against incursions by the English.

== Notable residents ==
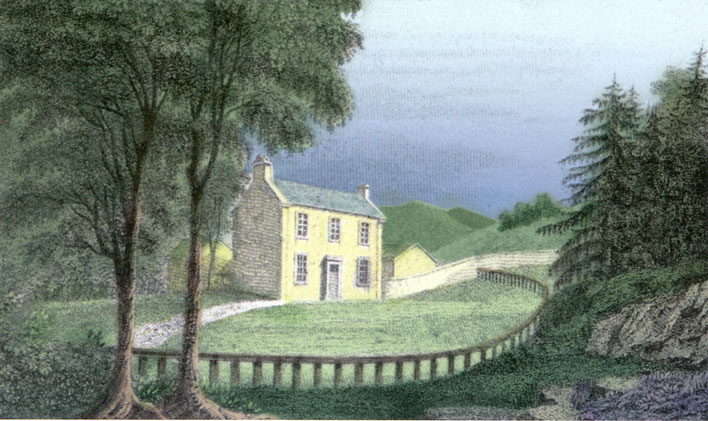
Craigenputtock House 1829, home of Thomas Carlyle

- Archibald Arnott (1772–1855), Napoleon's doctor on St Helena, was born in Ecclefechan on 18 April 1772 at Kirconnel Hall. He returned to Ecclefechan in his retirement and he was also buried in the Ecclefechan churchyard.
- Thomas Carlyle (1795–1881), the essayist, satirist, political philosopher and historian, was born at The Arched House, in Ecclefechan. He left Ecclefechan at the age of thirteen and walked the 84-mile (135-kilometre) journey to Edinburgh in order to attend university. In 1828 Carlyle moved to Craigenputtock with his wife Jane. He never forgot his roots and insisted that Ecclefechan should become his final resting place; he was buried in Ecclefechan churchyard on 5 February 1881.
- William Harkness (1837–1903), an astronomer, was born at Ecclefechan.
- Susanna Hawkins (1787–1868), poet.
- Janet Little (1759-1813), a poet who published The Poetical Works of Janet Little, The Scotch Milkmaid in 1791, was born at Nether Bogside in Ecclefechan parish. She was a contemporary of Robert Burns.
- J. B. McLachlan (1869-1937), Scottish-Canadian trade unionist and communist politician, was born in Ecclefechan in 1869.

== Culture ==
Robert Burns (1759–1796) composed a song entitled "The Lass O' Ecclefechan".

Ecclefechan also has links to the Guinness family: the story of the Whistling Ploughboy of Ecclefechan under the title "A Guinness With a Difference" was written by Derick Bingham and published by TBF Thompson Ministries; it charts the ploughboy's influence under God on the Guinness family.

"Oor Wullie" of The Sunday Post fame once got an afternoon off school for spelling "Ecclefechan" correctly (11 January 1948), and the Jocks and the Geordies of The Dandy once reminisced the Great Battle of Ecclefechan.

In "A Drunk Man Looks at the Thistle", Hugh MacDiarmid writes:

"And as at sicna times am I,
I wad ha'e Scotland to my eye
Until I saw a timeless flame
Tak' Auchtermuchty for a name,
And kent that Ecclefechan stood
As pairt o' an eternal mood." (ll.1968-1973).

== Local produce ==
Local produce includes:

- The Ecclefechan tart, which gained national prominence in late 2007 when the supermarket Sainsbury's promoted it as an alternative to mince pies at Christmas, and the tarts sold over 50,000 packs in November 2007. The tart is a mixture of butter and dried fruits in a pastry shell. A version made by the Moray confectioner Walkers is now nationally available throughout the United Kingdom.
- The Fechan, a blended Scotch whisky, whose label denotes the Arched House.

== See also ==
- Burnswark Hill
- Hoddom Castle
