= Archibald Arnott =

British Army surgeon (1772 – 1855)

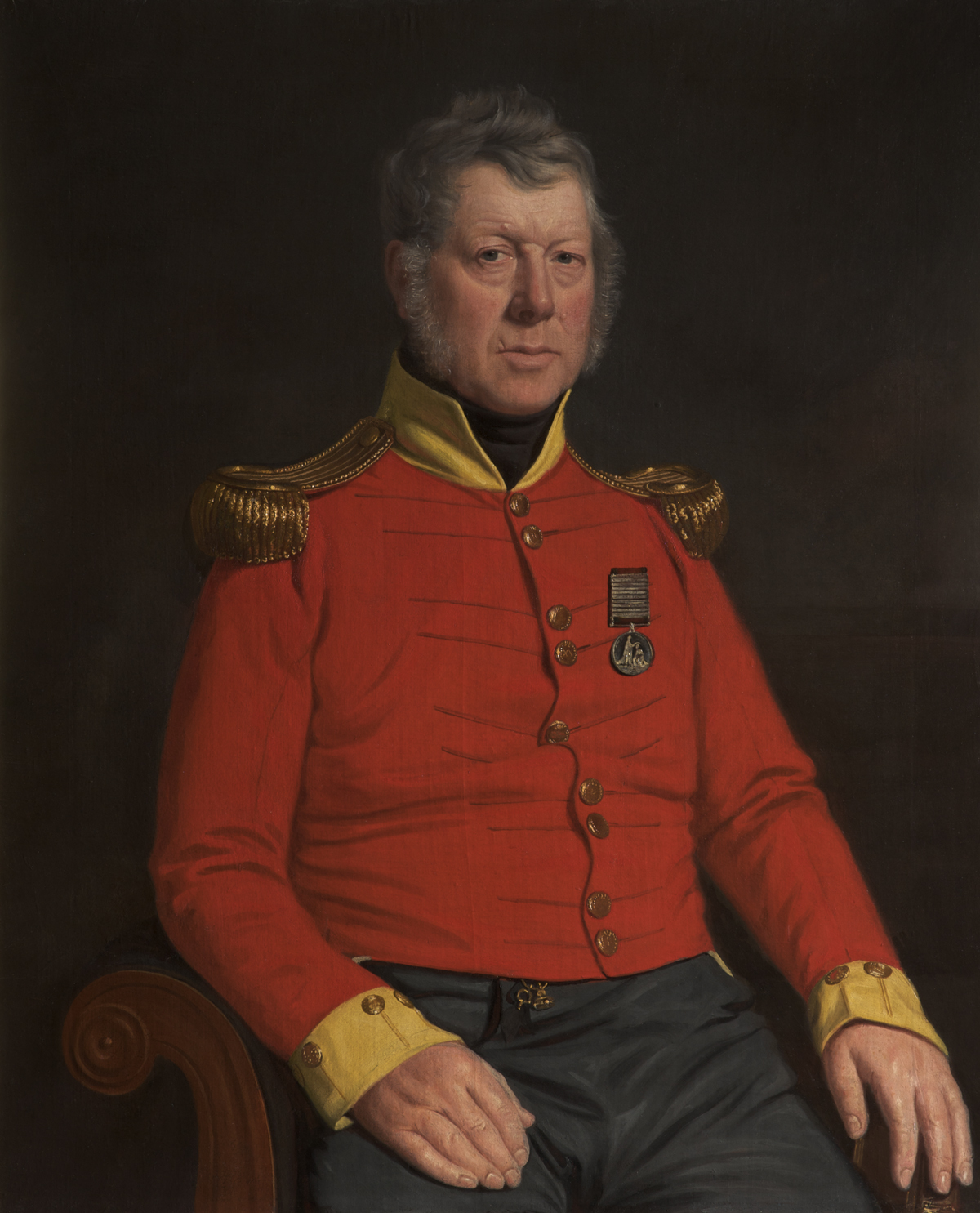
- Born: 18 April 1772; Ecclefechan, Dumfries, Scotland
- Died: 1855 (aged 82–83); Ecclefechan, Dumfries, Scotland
- Occupation: British Army surgeon
- Known for: Napoleon's doctor on St. Helena

Archibald Arnott (18 April 1772 – 1855) was a British Army surgeon best remembered as Napoleon's doctor on St. Helena, who was present at the Emperor's autopsy. In his retirement he returned to Ecclefechan, where he is buried.

== British Army surgeon ==
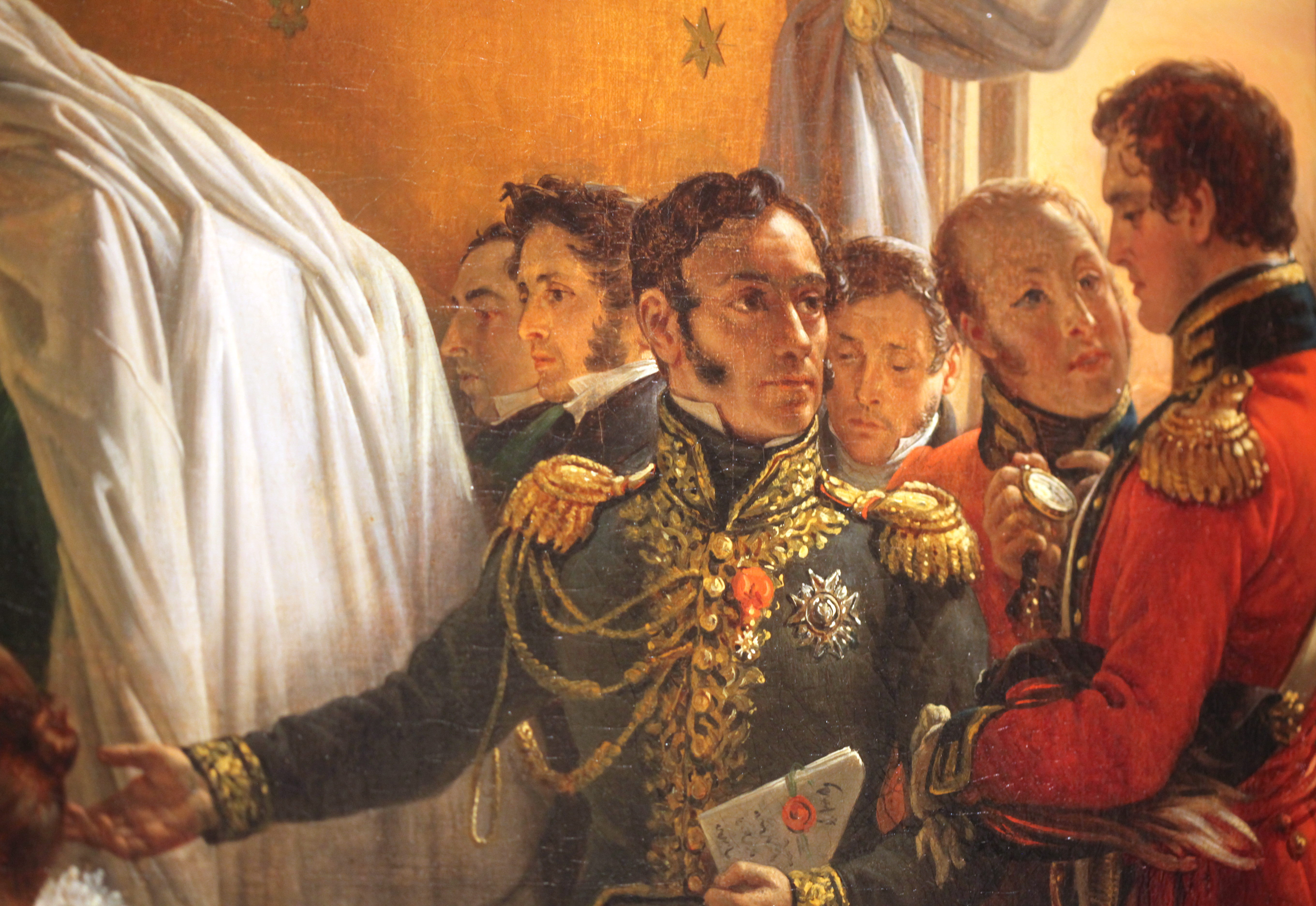
Detail of Charles de Steuben's portrait of Napoleon's death, showing (left to right) Coursot the butler, Pierron the cook, the marquis de Montholon, the surgeon Francis Burton, Dr. Arnott (holding watch indicating time of death) and the orderly, Capt. William Crokat.

He entered the British Army on 14 April 1795 and was posted to the 11th Hussars as an assistant surgeon. Arnott was promoted to surgeon on 23 August 1799. He followed his unit to Holland and was present at the storming of the entrenchments at Krabbendam. He was later transferred to the 20th Regiment of Foot at Menorca and was present at the storming of Alexandria. He continued to serve with the 20th Regiment at Malta, Sicily and Calabria and was present at the Battle of Maida.

He continued to serve with the 20th Regiment at the Vimiera and in the retreat from the Battle of Corunna. He followed his unit in the Walcheren expedition where his military unit was decimated by fever. In 1812 Arnott served with the Duke of Wellington in his campaigns until the end of the war, including the Battle of Vittoria, in the Pyrenees and in India.

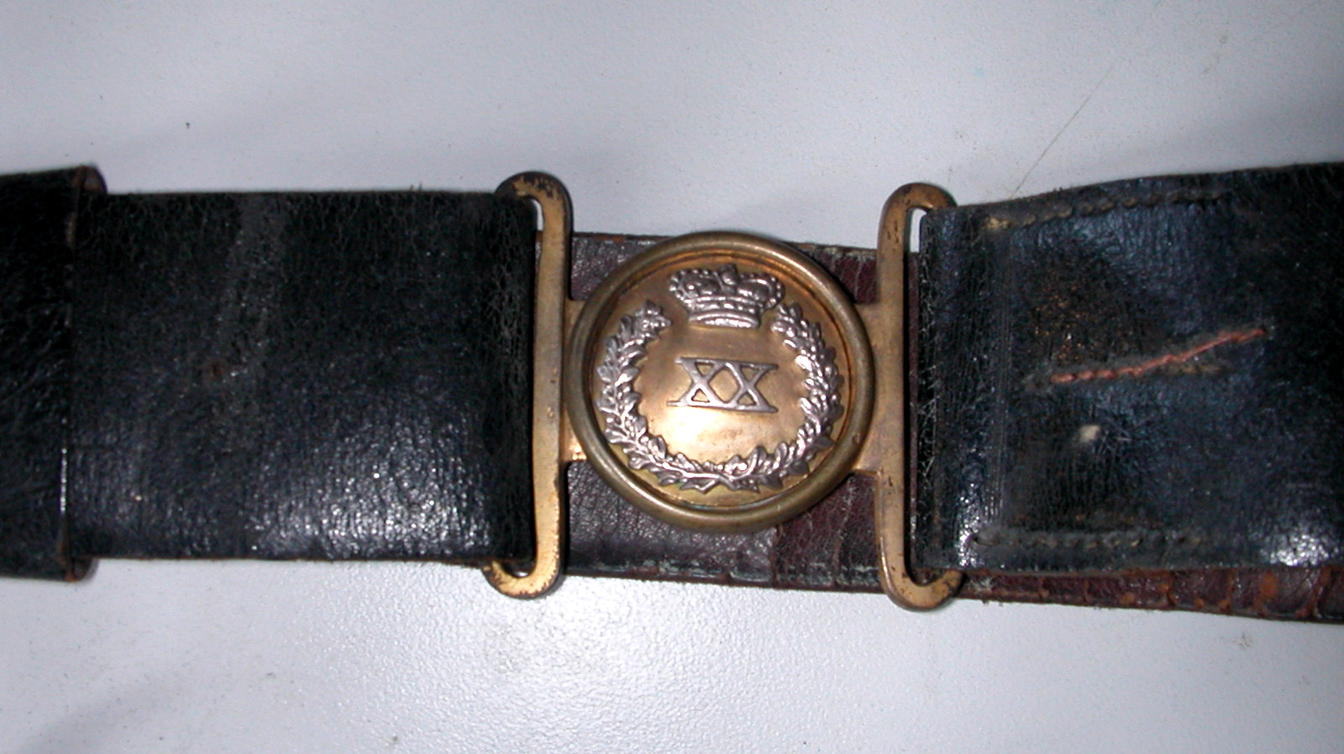
Arnott's belt buckle worn whilst attending Napoleon on his deathbed. Buckle is the Regiment Badge of the 20th Foot. Collection of the Yuko Nii Foundation.

As the fourth and last of Napoleon's physicians on St. Helena, Arnott arrived, following his regiment in 1819, and on 21 April 1821 visited Napoleon in his professional capacity. He quickly established excellent relations with the Emperor, becoming his most trusted doctor, and attended to him until his death. The Emperor was bedridden for some days as a result of persistent vomiting and Arnott prescribed potions, with no initial results, eventually prescribing a sedative generally thought to be opium, which relieved the Emperor's symptoms. On 3 May, Arnott prescribed calomel for the Emperor's constipation with good results. Prior to his death, Napoleon ordered a snuff box brought to him and carved an "N" with a pen knife and presented it to Dr. Arnott, along with a locket of his hair, a pair of duelling pistols and a handkerchief. The snuff box was last known to be in the possession of Alan Cunningham, a British Army officer. The pistols are in the collection of the Small Firearms Museum, Warminster, Wiltshire.

During the night following the Emperor's death, Arnott took a death mask made from surgical wax (as no gypsum was available on the island) and inscribed it with his signature and the date 6 Mai 1821. This is now in the collection of the Musée Masséna in Nice, France.

On 3 May 1821 Napoleon gave instructions that should he become insensible, no English physician but Arnott was to touch him. Napoleon died on 5 May 1821, and Arnott attended his post-mortem examination. The Emperor bequeathed Arnott six hundred Napoleons and the British government gave him an additional payment of five hundred pounds.

== Writings ==
After his retirement to Ecclefechan and his estate of Kirconnel Hall, Arnott acquired a collection of anecdotes of the period and wrote an "Account of the last illness, Decease, and Post-mortem appearances of Napoleon" in 1822. Respected by his neighbours, he was buried in Ecclefechan churchyard.
