= Eve's pudding =

Traditional British pudding

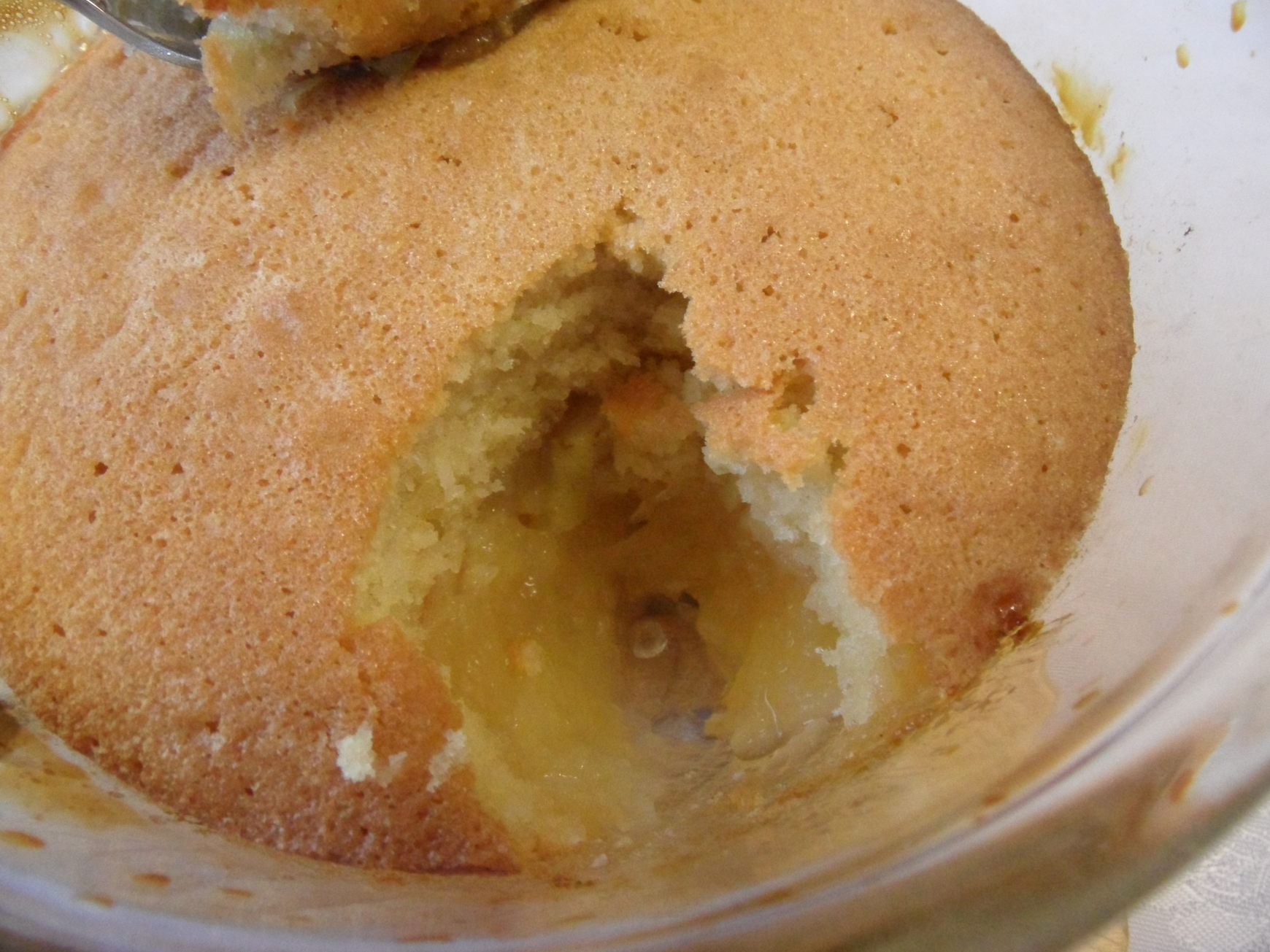
- A home-made Eve's pudding
- Type: Pudding
- Place of origin: England
- Main ingredients: Victoria sponge cake, apples

Eve's pudding, also known as Mother Eve's pudding, is a type of traditional British pudding made from apples baked under a Victoria sponge cake mixture. The name is a reference to the apple variety traditionally used (an eating apple) called Eve. The pudding can be served with custard, cream, or ice cream. It is a version of Duke of Cumberland's pudding, named after Prince William, Duke of Cumberland. The first known recipe is from 1824 and uses grated bread and grated suet.
