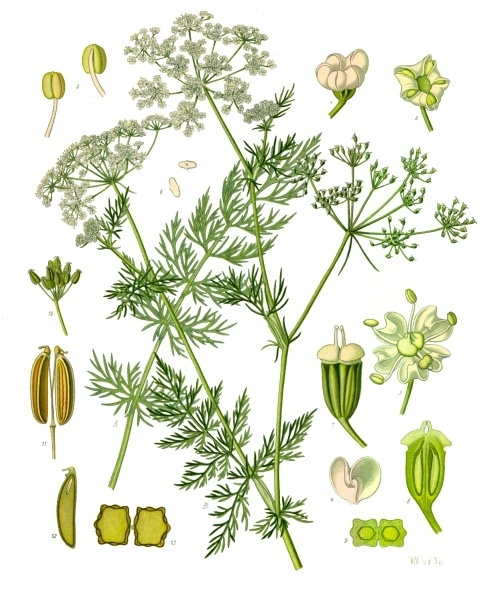

Scientific classification
- Kingdom: Plantae
- Clade: Tracheophytes
- Clade: Angiosperms
- Clade: Eudicots
- Clade: Asterids
- Order: Apiales
- Family: Apiaceae
- Genus: Carum
- Species: C. carvi

Binomial name
- Carum carvi L.

= Caraway =

Species of plant in the carrot family

Caraway (Carum carvi), also known as meridian fennel, is a biennial plant in the family Apiaceae, native to western Asia, Europe, and North Africa.

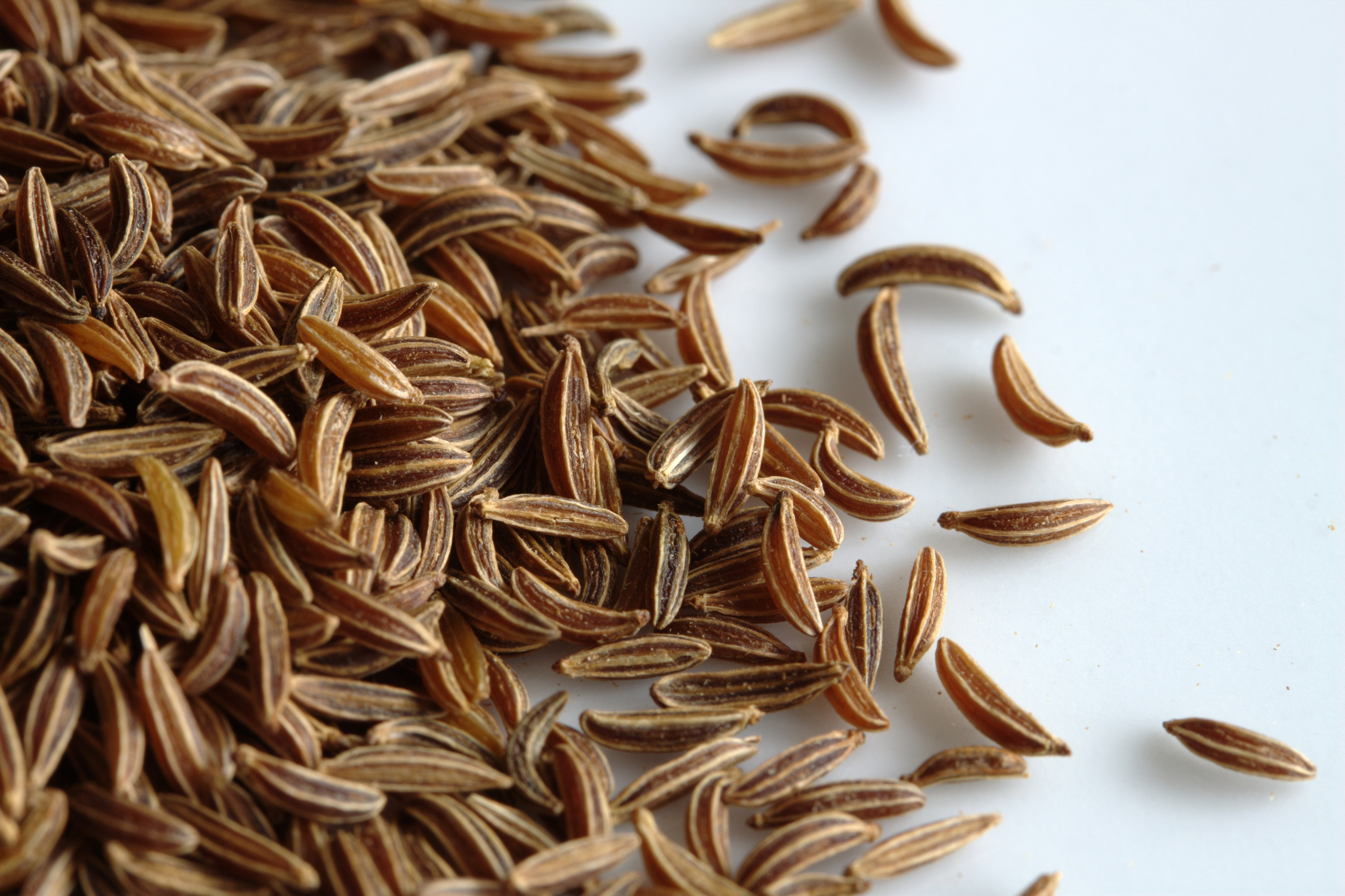
Caraway fruits, informally called "seeds"

Caraway seeds
Nutritional value per 100 g (3.5 oz)
- Energy: 1,390 kJ (330 kcal)
- Carbohydrates: 49.90 g
- Sugars: 0.64 g
- Dietary fiber: 38.0 g
- Fat: 14.59 g
- Saturated: 0.620 g
- Monounsaturated: 7.125 g
- Polyunsaturated: 3.272 g
- Protein: 19.77 g
Vitamins and minerals
Vitamins	Quantity %DV^{†}
Vitamin A equiv.	2% 18 μg
Thiamine (B1)	32% 0.383 mg
Riboflavin (B2)	29% 0.379 mg
Niacin (B3)	23% 3.606 mg
Vitamin B6	21% 0.360 mg
Folate (B9)	3% 10 μg
Vitamin C	23% 21.0 mg
Vitamin E	17% 2.5 mg
Vitamin K	0% 0 μg
Minerals	Quantity %DV^{†}
Calcium	53% 689 mg
Iron	90% 16.23 mg
Magnesium	61% 258 mg
Phosphorus	45% 568 mg
Potassium	45% 1351 mg
Sodium	1% 17 mg
Zinc	50% 5.5 mg
- Other constituents: Quantity
- Water: 9.87 g
- Link to USDA Database entry
- ^{†}Percentages estimated using US recommendations for adults, except for potassium, which is estimated based on expert recommendation from the National Academies.

== Etymology ==
The etymology of "caraway" is unclear. Caraway has been called by many names in different regions, with names deriving from the Latin cuminum (cumin), the Greek karon (again, cumin), which was adapted into Latin as carum (now meaning caraway), and the Sanskrit karavi, sometimes translated as "caraway", but other times understood to mean "fennel". English use of the term caraway dates to at least 1440, possibly having Arabic origin.

== Description ==
The plant is similar in appearance to other members of the carrot family, with finely divided, feathery leaves with thread-like divisions, growing on 20–30 cm (8–12 in) stems. The main flower stem is 30–60 cm (12–24 in) tall, with small white or pink flowers in compound umbels composed of 5–16 unequal rays 1–6 cm (0.4–2.4 in) long. Caraway fruits, informally called seeds, are smooth, crescent-shaped, laterally compressed achenes, around 3 mm (1/8 in) long, with five pale ridges and a distinctive pleasant smell when crushed. It flowers in June and July.

== History ==
Caraway might have been mentioned by the early Greek botanist Pedanius Dioscorides in his De Materia Medica as a herb and tonic. It was later mentioned in the Roman Apicius as an ingredient in recipes. Caraway was known in the Arab world as karawiya, and cultivated in Morocco.

== Cultivation ==
The plant prefers warm, sunny locations and well-drained soil rich in organic matter. In warmer regions, it is planted in the winter as an annual. In temperate climates, it is planted as a summer annual or biennial.

== Nutrition ==
Caraway seeds are 10% water, 50% carbohydrates, 20% protein, and 15% fat (table). In a 100 grams (3.5 oz) reference amount, caraway seeds are a rich source (20% or more of the Daily Value, DV) of protein, B vitamins (24–33% DV), vitamin C (25% DV), and several dietary minerals, especially iron (125% DV), phosphorus (81% DV), and zinc (58% DV) (table).

== Phytochemicals ==
When ground, caraway seeds yield up to 7.5% of volatile oil, mostly S-carvone, and 15% fixed oil of which the major fatty acids are oleic, linoleic, petroselinic, and palmitic acids.

Phytochemicals identified in caraway seed oil include thymol, o-cymene, γ‑terpinene, trimethylene dichloride, β-pinene, 2-(1-cyclohexenyl), cyclohexanone, β-phellandrene, 3-carene, α-thujene, and linalool.

== Uses ==
The fruits, usually used whole, have a pungent, anise-like flavor and aroma that comes from essential oils, mostly carvone, limonene, and anethole. Caraway is used as a spice in breads, especially rye bread. A common use of caraway is whole as an addition to rye bread, as in Jewish rye bread (see Borodinsky bread). Caraway seeds are often used in Irish soda bread and other baked goods.

Caraway may be used in desserts, liquors, and other foods. Its leaves can be added to salads, stews, and soups, and are sometimes consumed as herbs, either raw, dried, or cooked, similar to parsley. The root is consumed as a winter root vegetable in some places, similar to parsnips.

Caraway fruits are found in diverse European cuisines and dishes, for example sauerkraut. It is used in the United Kingdom's caraway seed cake. In Czech cuisine, it is routinely added to boiled potatoes used as a side dish. In Hungarian cuisine, it is added to goulash, and in Norwegian cuisine and Swedish cuisine, it is used for making caraway black bread.

Caraway oil is used to for the production of Kümmel liquor in Germany and Russia, Scandinavian akvavit, and Icelandic brennivín. Caraway can be infused in a variety of cheeses, such as danbo and bondost to add flavor. In Latvian cuisine, whole caraway seeds are added to the Jāņi sour milk cheese. In Oxford, where the plant appeared to have become naturalised in a meadow, the seeds were formerly offered on a tray by publicans to people who wished to disguise the odour of their drinker's breath.
