= Raspberry ripple =

Flavour of ice-cream

Raspberry Ripple
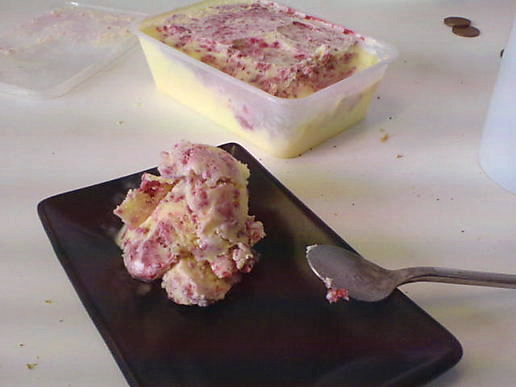
- Homemade raspberry ripple ice cream
- Type: Ice cream
- Place of origin: United Kingdom
- Serving temperature: Cold
- Main ingredients: Raspberry syrup, vanilla ice cream

Raspberry ripple is a popular flavour of ice cream particularly in Great Britain and also elsewhere. It consists of raspberry syrup injected into vanilla ice cream. "Raspberry ripple" was also the name given to other raspberry-flavoured food products in the 1920s.

The term "ripple" in ice cream manufacture and consumption may have originated in the United States where from the 1930s, it was used to denote any type of ice cream ribboned through with coloured and flavoured syrup. Around this time, machinery had been developed which would allow ice cream to incorporate fruit paste separately in a marbled effect. Raspberry ripple has been a popular variant ever since.

== In popular culture ==
Raspberry ripple is Cockney rhyming slang for nipple and cripple.

== See also ==
- Millie's Cookies
- Wall's (ice cream)
