= Ecclefechan tart =

Scottish dried fruit and butter-filled pastry

Ecclefechan Tart
- Type: Pastry
- Place of origin: Scotland
- Region or state: Dumfriesshire
- Serving temperature: Cold
- Main ingredients: Pastry crust, Sugar, Butter, dried fruit, Vinegar

Ecclefechan tarts, also known as Ecclefechan butter tarts, are a traditional Scottish baked pastry consisting of an outer pastry crust filled with butter, muscovado sugar, dried fruit such as raisins and cherries, in addition to a small quantity of vinegar. The filling forms a treacle as it bakes. It can also contain chopped almonds and a mixture of spices.

They are named after the village of Ecclefechan, located in Dumfries and Galloway in the south of Scotland, where it is sold by many local businesses and has become an attraction for tourists.

In 2007, Ecclefechan tarts gained national prominence in the UK when the supermarket Sainsbury's promoted them as an alternative to mince pies at Christmas, the tarts sold over 50,000 packs in November 2007. In comparison to the fruity, spicy flavour of a mince pie, an Ecclefechan tart is characterised by a caramel flavour.

== History ==
A comprehensive history of the tart does not exist, as such how it came to be associated with Ecclefechan is unclear.

Somewhat similar recipes for a butter tart, a crust pastry with a filling of fruit, almonds, sugar, butter, and wine, can be found in Britain from the early 18th century. Sugars such as muscovado were not widely available to the average Scot until the 19th century. It has been theorised that, as the recipe spread to Scotland, certain ingredients were dropped and substituted due to lack of availability and prohibitive cost.
