= Chestnut pudding =

Type of pudding

Chestnut pudding is a traditional pudding found in European cuisine. It's similar to mont blanc, but simpler, without meringue. The amount of sugar in the recipe varies, with some versions described as more of a "savory custard". This can be made a dessert by increasing the sugar.

Historic recipes from the 17th to early 20th century include sherry, Marsala or other wines. An 18th-century recipe from The Compleat Housewife is flavored with orange blossom water, rose water and sack and baked in a puff pastry lined dish with butter or marrow. Modern variations may use canned chestnuts pureed with sugar, milk, brandy and cloves and whisked with eggs until frothy. Chestnuts are strongly associated with winter, and chestnut pudding can be made for the holidays, served with winter fruits like wine-poached pears.

In Portuguese cuisine its known as pudim de castanha and is molded similar to crème caramel and baked with caramel sauce.
