= Queen of Puddings =

British dessert

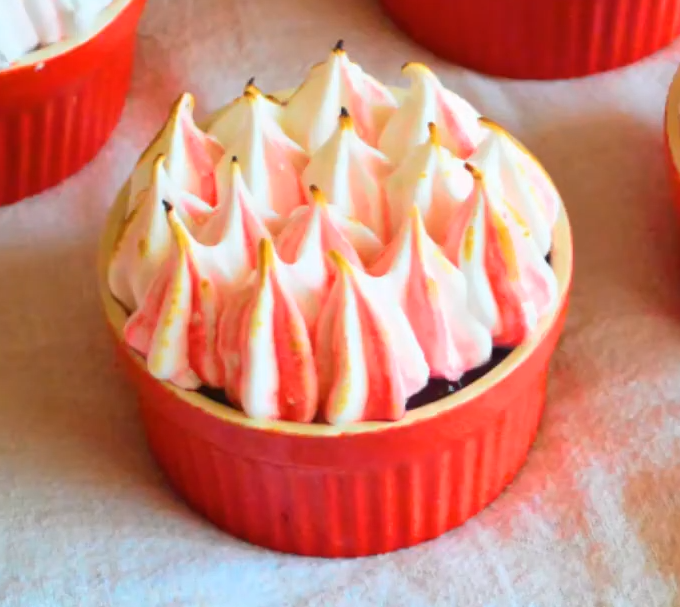
- A small Queen of Puddings
- Type: Pudding
- Course: Dessert
- Place of origin: United Kingdom
- Main ingredients: Sugar, butter, breadcrumbs, Milk, lemon zest, egg yolks, whole egg, jam, meringue

Queen of Puddings is a traditional British dessert, consisting of a baked, breadcrumb-thickened egg mixture, spread with jam and topped with meringue. Similar recipes are called Monmouth Pudding and Manchester Pudding.

== History ==
Variant forms of puddings made with breadcrumbs boiled with milk can be found dating back to the seventeenth century. The Closet Opened was posthumously published in 1699 by a servant and his son. In it, Sir Kenelm Digby talks of many puddings, including one that involves soaking bread in milk. There were a variety of puddings made using the remains of bread and warm milk. A Monmouth Pudding is said to consist of layers of meringue, jam or seasonal fruit, and bread soaked in milk, whilst Manchester Pudding is similar but contains egg yolks (but some have speculated that this name was just a synonym for the Queen of Puddings). Several reference works date this variation layered pudding to the nineteenth century, including in the United States.

Typical recipes for 20th century Queen of Puddings can be found in many post-war British cookbooks, such as those of Marguerite Patten, Delia Smith, Jane Grigson and in Mary Norwak's book on English Puddings. In the 1960s, it was on the British government recommended diet for sick children.

== Generic method ==
Milk and lemon zest are heated to boiling in a saucepan. Sugar, butter and breadcrumbs are mixed into the hot milk, which is allowed to cool. Egg yolks and a whole egg are beaten into this mixture, which is transferred into a deep pie dish, and then baked in a bain-marie until set, resulting in a firm, brownish base.

The base is then spread with jam—usually raspberry or blackcurrant—and a meringue mix made from the reserved egg whites is spooned over the jam. The pudding is returned to the oven and baked until the meringue is golden but still soft. The pudding is eaten hot.

In some variations, sliced cooked fruits replace the jam layer.

== Influences ==
There was a Toronto theater group called The Queen of Puddings Music Theatre Company that specialized in avant-garde opera.

== See also ==
- List of custard desserts
- Bread pudding
