= Caraway seed cake =

Traditional British cake

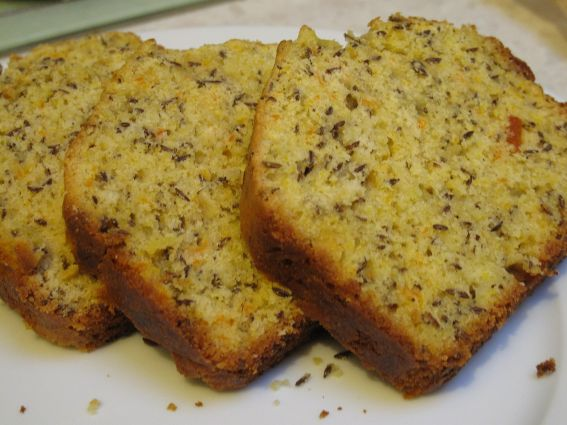
- Type: Cake
- Place of origin: United Kingdom
- Main ingredients: Flour, eggs, caraway seeds

Seed cake is a traditional British cake flavoured with caraway or other flavoursome seeds. Caraway seeds have been long used in British cookery, and at one time caraway-seed biscuits were prepared to mark the end of the sowing of the spring wheat. These particular biscuits later evolved into this distinctively flavoured teacake.

== History ==
James Matterer reports that recipes for seed cake are found in A.W.'s Book of Cookrye (1591) and The English Huswife by Gervase Markham (1615). The cake was popular in the 1700s, and through the Victorian era. Recipes for it are included in many early cookbooks, including Hannah Glasse's The Art of Cookery made Plain and Easy (1747) (note that there are recipes for "cheap seed-cake" and "a rich seed-cake, called the nun's cake"), Elizabeth Moxon's English Housewifery Exemplified (1764), Amelia Simmons' American Cookery (1796), Mary Eaton's The Cook and Housekeeper's Complete and Universal Dictionary (1822), and Isabella Beeton's Book of Household Management (1861).

"Seed cake" and "caraway cake" often have different recipes (see, e.g., recipes number 231 "carraway cake" and number 235 "seed cake" in Elizabeth Moxon's 1764 cookbook, and recipes for "carraway cake" and "seed cake" in Mary Eaton's 1822 cookbook). Caraway seeds were so popular a flavouring that they appear in at least 14 cake or biscuit recipes, as well as other items, including soap, a treatment for "hysterics," and as a bait for rat traps in The Cook and Housekeeper's Complete and Universal Dictionary.

== Other ==
The Goosnargh cake is a similar cake or biscuit named after the village in Lancashire.
