= List of sweet puddings =

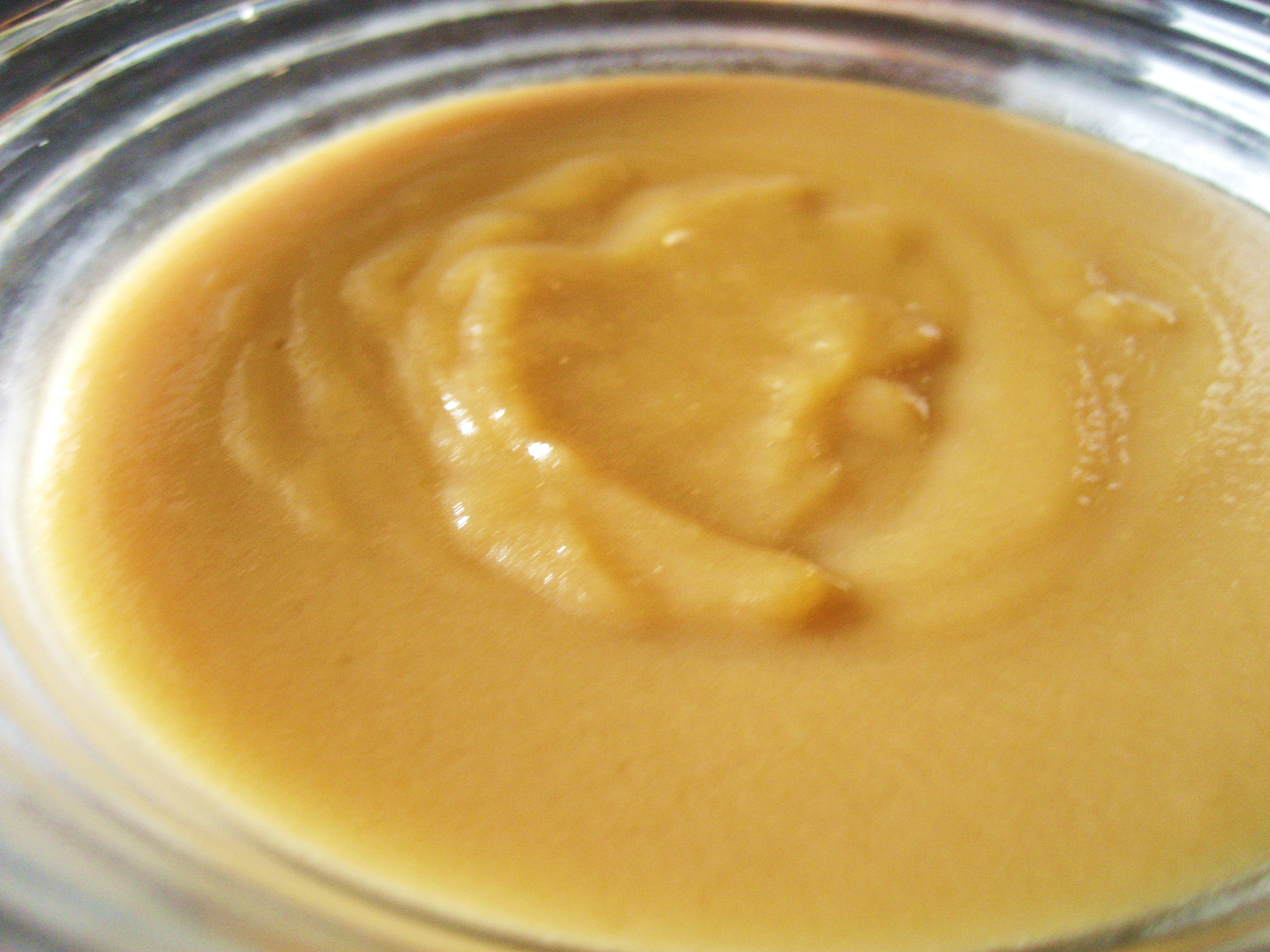
Butterscotch pudding

This is a list of sweet puddings that conform to one of two definitions:

- A dish consisting of a fluid mixture of various ingredients baked, steamed or boiled into a solid mass
- A dessert consisting of sweetened milk thickened to a creamy consistency, either by cooking or the addition of starch or other thickening agent (see: Creamy pudding)

== Puddings ==
Name	Image	Origin	Description
Almond jelly		Hong Kong	Gelatin-like pudding made with almond milk
Ashure		Turkey	Made from a mixture of fruit, nuts and grain.
Asida		Maghreb	Similar to a sweet porridge.
Assidat zgougou		Tunisia	Made from ground Aleppo pine seeds and sugar, boiled into a thick, spoonable mixture. It is overlaid with vanilla custard, often covered with almond and pistachio powder. The topping consists of a mixture of nuts arranged in decorative patterns.
Abade de Priscos		Portugal	Made from eggs, sugar, Port wine, and presunto (fat layer)
Bebinca		Portugal and India	Made with coconut milk.
Bilo-bilo		Philippines	Made of small glutinous balls (sweet sticky rice flour rounded up by adding water) in coconut milk and sugar. Then jackfruit, saba bananas, sweet potatoes, taro, and tapioca pearls or sago.
Blancmange		France	Gelatinous pudding made from cream or milk and sugar, thickened with cornstarch and gelatin
Bonet		Italy	Custard pudding made by combining eggs, milk, cocoa powder, and sugar.
Bread and butter pudding		United Kingdom	Made by layering slices of buttered bread scattered with raisins in an oven dish into which an egg and milk mixture, commonly seasoned with nutmeg (and sometimes vanilla or other spices), is poured. It is then baked in an oven and served. Some people may serve it with custard or cream, but often the pudding under the crust is moist enough to be eaten without sauce.
Brown Betty		United States	Made from breadcrumbs and apples, it is thought to date back to Colonial times.
Bubur ketan hitam		Indonesia	Made from black glutinous rice, coconut milk, palm sugar or cane sugar. The pudding date back to the Majapahit era (13th to 16th centuries).
Cabinet pudding		United Kingdom	A traditional pudding with currants and sultanas mixed in.
Christmas pudding		United Kingdom	Made with brandy, treacle and dried fruit. The dried fruit and peel are soaked in brandy, and later the whole pudding is before being set on fire at table. The brandy enables it to burn. This pudding is usually topped with plastic or sweet robins, skaters, berries, holly and snowmen.
Chocolate pudding		United States	Most commonly a chocolate custard like dessert thickened with starch rather than eggs. It is generally boiled then chilled before serving.
Clootie dumpling		Scotland	A dumpling served as dessert, stuffed with currants, sultanas, breadcrumbs, golden syrup and milk.
Coconut pudding		Hong Kong	A dim sum dessert made with coconut milk. Also called a coconut bar.
Cơm rượu		Vietnam	A rice pudding.
Crème brûlée		France, Spain or England	Custard egg pudding topped with a layer of hardened caramelized sugar.
Crème caramel		France, Spain	Gelatinous custard pudding topped with caramel.
Doufuhua		China	Made from tofu as main ingredient. Certain variant includes brown sugar, osmanthus syrup or soy milk.
Dutch baby pancake		United States	Similar to Yorkshire pudding.
Eve's pudding		United Kingdom	Made from apples and Victoria sponge cake mixture.
Figgy duff		Canada	Traditional bag pudding, containing no figs as the name implies.
Figgy pudding		United Kingdom	Like a white Christmas pudding containing figs. The pudding may be baked, steamed in the oven, boiled or fried.
Flummery		United Kingdom	Made from stewed fruit and cream.
Frumenty		United Kingdom	Made primarily from boiled, cracked wheat - hence its name, which derives from the Latin word frumentum, "grain". Different recipes added milk, eggs or broth. Other recipes include almonds, currants, sugar, saffron and orange flower water.
Goody		Ireland	Made by boiling bread in milk with sugar and spices.
Got fan		China	Made with plant powders.
Haupia		Polynesia	Gelatin-like dessert made from coconut.
Jam roly-poly		United Kingdom	Like a Swiss roll filled with jam.
Jiuniang		China	Rice pudding made from fermented glutinous rice and sweet osmanthus syrup
Junket		United Kingdom	Made from sweetened milk curdled with rennet.
Kazandibi		Turkey	Literally means 'bottom of cauldron', typically made from tavuk göğsü or muhallebi.
Keşkül		Turkey	Almond based milk pudding, often garnished with coconut shaving or pistachio nuts and is off-white in colour.
Kheer		India	Made by boiling rice or broken wheat with milk and sugar, and flavored with cardamom, raisins, saffron, cashew nuts, pistachios or almonds.
Kue asida		Indonesia	Localized variation of Asida in Indonesia.
Kūlolo		Hawaii	A cake-like coconut pudding with a caramel-like taste.
Kutia		Eastern Europe	Grain based.
Leche asada		South America	Baked flan pudding made with milk, eggs, sugar, and vanilla extract.
Malvern pudding		United Kingdom	Baked dish made with apples and custard.
Malva pudding		South Africa	South African pudding with a caramel-based apricot jam.
Mango pudding		China	Made from mango and a cream mixture; often served in dim sum restaurants
Muhallebi		Middle East	Milk pudding similar to blancmange.
Oshaf		Albania	Dairy pudding made of sheep milk, dried figs, sugar and cinnamon.
Panna cotta		Italy	Meaning "cooked cream", usually eaten chilled with fruit or spices.
Persimmon pudding		United States	Traditional American dessert made with persimmons.
Pistachio pudding		United States	Simple pudding made with pistachio nuts.
Po'e		Polynesia	Made with mango, pineapple or banana, it is similar to poi.
Poi		Samoa	Made with tropical fruits, coconut milk and other flavorings.
Puding Diraja		Malaysia	Sweet pudding made of fios de ovos, banana, evaporated milk, cherries and cashew nuts. Sometimes, added either prunes, raisins or dates.
Put chai ko		China	Snack made with steamed sugar
Queen of Puddings		United Kingdom	Rich dessert made from sweetened breadcrumbs topped with jam and meringue.
Rødgrød		Denmark and Germany	Called "Rote Grütze" in German, both names meaning "red groat". Sweet and fruit-sour dessert, based on redcurrant, raspberry, blackberry, blackcurrant, and (stoned) cherries; uses starch, sago, semolina or (in former times) groat as thickening agent
Rượu nếp		Vietnam	Made from glutinous rice that has been fermented with the aid of yeast and steamed in a banana leaf.
Sago pudding		Southeast Asia	Simple pudding made of Sago as main ingredient.
Spotted dick		United Kingdom	The "spots" are currants and sultanas.
Sticky date pudding		United Kingdom	Like a sticky toffee pudding, but with dates mixed in.
Sticky toffee pudding		United Kingdom	A rich sponge pudding saturated in a toffee sauce
Suet pudding		United Kingdom	Made with Suet, flour, bread crumbs, raisins and spices
Summer pudding		United Kingdom	White bread filled with berries and their juices. The bread goes pink when the berries burst and the juices flow onto it.
Sussex pond pudding		United Kingdom	A rich, heavy pudding that forms a "pond" from the caramel.
Sütlaç		Turkey	Rice pudding, sometimes baked.
Tapioca pudding		Brazil	A simple, bland, grain based pudding made with milk, tapioca pearls and sugar.
Teurgoule		France	Rice pudding speciality of Normandy. Consists of rice cooked in milk, sweetened with sugar, and flavoured with cinnamon and sometimes nutmeg.
Tocino de cielo		Spain	Spanish pudding made primarily of egg yolks, sugar, and water. It is often confused for a custard.
Tong sui		China	Sweet pudding or soup served as a dessert typically at the end of a meal in Chinese cuisine. Made of various ingredients.
Toucinho do Céu		Portugal	Portuguese cake-like pudding made of eggs, almonds and little wheat flour. Some spices, such cinnamon or cloves, are added along with orange zest or amaretto.
Treacle sponge pudding		United Kingdom	Like a sponge cake, usually served with custard.
Watalappam		Sri Lanka	Made from coconut milk, eggs and sugar.
Zerde		Turkey	Made from rice, colored yellow with saffron.

== See also ==
- List of savoury puddings
- List of baked goods
- List of custard desserts
- List of desserts
