= Kōʻelepālau =

Hawaiian sweet potato pudding

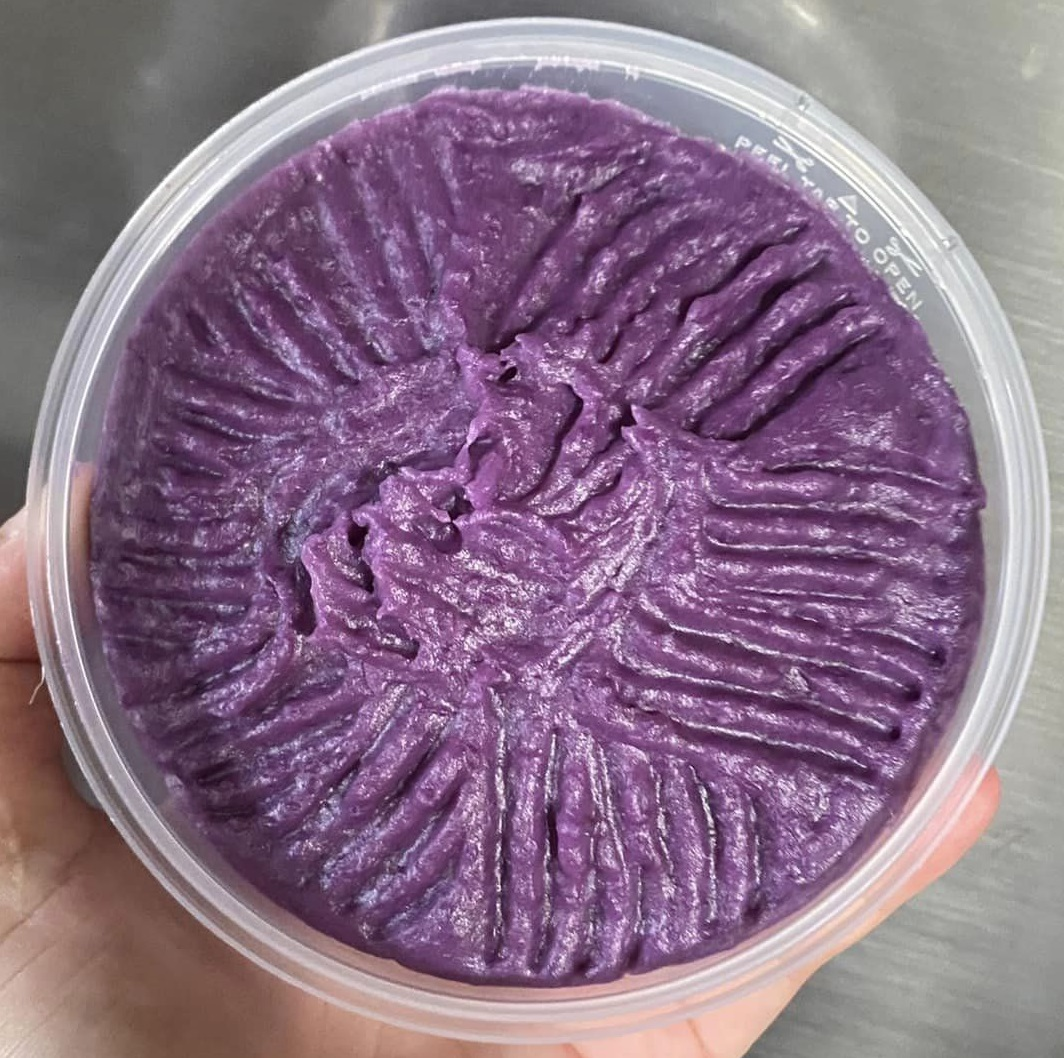
- A container of kōʻele pālau made with Okinawan sweet potato, a local variety
- Alternative names: Kōʻele pālau, pālau
- Type: Pudding
- Course: Dessert
- Place of origin: Hawaii
- Serving temperature: Warm or cold
- Main ingredients: Sweet potatoes, coconut milk
- Ingredients generally used: Salt, sugar, shredded coconut
- Variations: Poi
- Similar dishes: Piele, pepeieʻe, kūlolo, poi (dessert), nilupak, ube halaya

Kōʻelepālau (anglicized as koelepalau), or pālau, (Note: Pālau is the abbreviated name for kōʻelepālau as well as the ancient Maui dialect term for sweet potato. The common Native Hawaiian term for sweet potato is ʻuala (or ʻuwala).) is a Hawaiian pudding made primarily with cooked sweet potatoes mixed with coconut cream. It is similar to other Native Hawaiian puddings like kūlolo and piele.

It was once a dish well documented by many non-Hawaiians as an everyday dish, or as a dessert found at ʻahaʻaina (or lūʻau) found alongside kūlolo, and was noted by Robert Louis Stevenson during his visits in the late 1800s.

== History ==
Sweet potato is one of the most earliest, cultivated crop carried into the central Pacific Islands by Austronesian peoples around 1300 AD, where they became a staple crop of Polynesians. Although associated as a root vegetable, all parts of the sweet potato was utilized. However, sweet potatoes were considered inferior and less valuable than taro, or kōʻele―a rare term used for "less desirable portions of meat or fish," but it was able to flourish in unfavorable growing conditions.

== Preparation ==
Traditional kōʻelepālau recipes call for sweet potatoes roasted over coals or kālua (cooked in an imu or earth oven). In modern recipes, any method to cook sweet potatoes can be used such as steaming or boiling. The sweet potatoes are usually removed of its skin then thoroughly mashed. Coconut milk, or milk substitute, is then mixed to the desired consistency. Optionally, additional sugar can be added or garnished with shredded coconut.

== See also ==
- Haupia – Polynesian coconut milk pudding
- Kūlolo – Hawaiian dessert using coconut milk
- Sweet potato haupia pie – Hawaiian dessert
- Poi (Hawaiian food) – Traditional staple food in the Polynesian diet
- Poi (dessert) – Traditional Samoan fruit dessert
