= List of puddings =

List of puddings may refer to:

- List of savoury puddings
- List of sweet puddings
