= Asida =

Arabic pudding

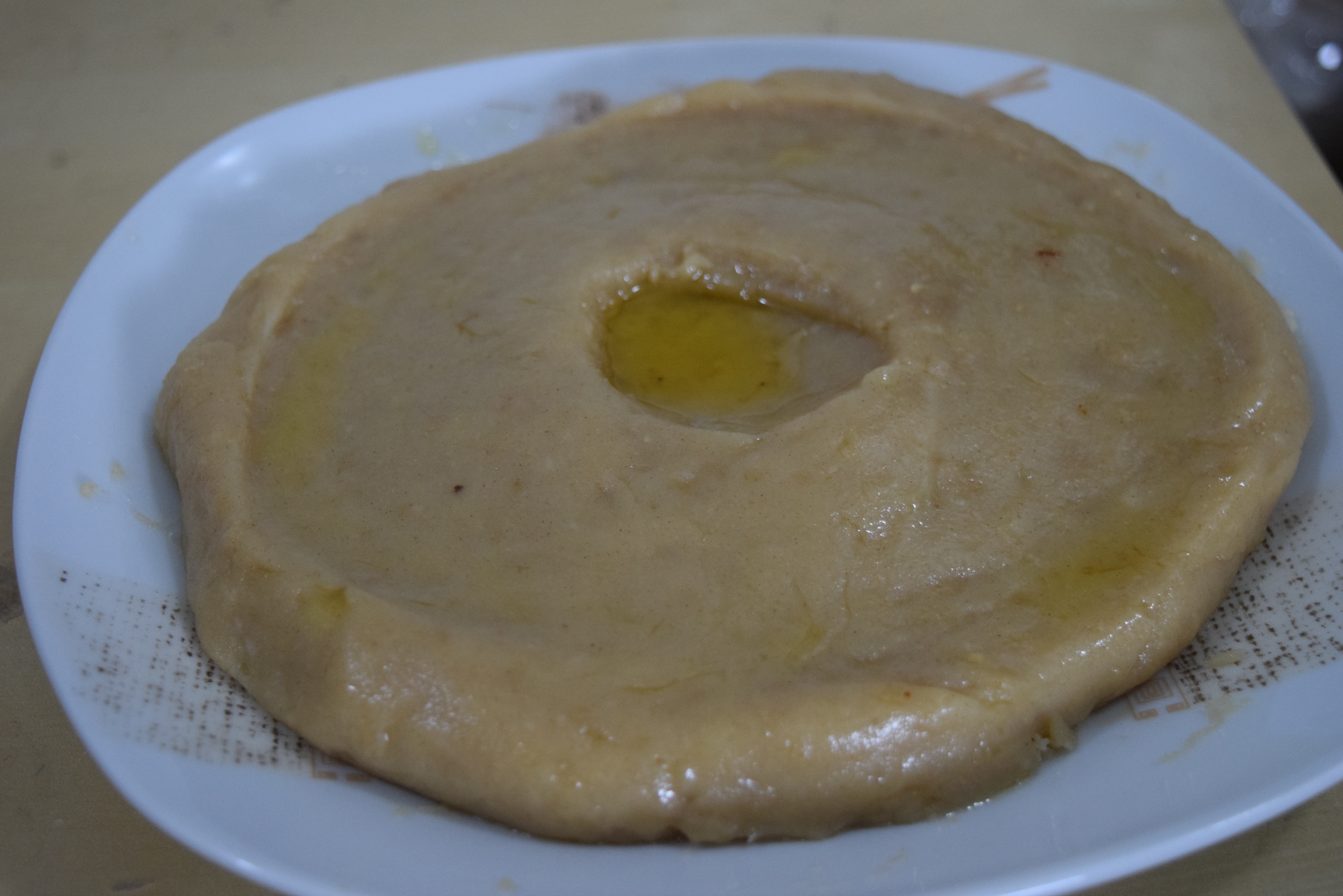
- Type: Pudding
- Region or state: Abbasid Caliphate
- Main ingredients: Wheat flour; butter or honey

Asida (Arabic: عصيدة, or Maghrebi ġsydë, pronounced [ˈʕs(ˁ)iːdə]), a common dish in the Arab world, is a lump of dough made by stirring wheat flour into boiling water, sometimes with added butter or honey. Similar in texture to fufu, it is eaten mainly in Middle East and African countries. It is considered one of the best-known desserts and traditional dishes in many Arab countries.

Asida is particularly common in Sudan, Morocco, Libya, Algeria, Tunisia, Yemen, Ethiopia, Eritrea, and the rest of the Middle East. Often served during religious holidays such as Mawlid and Eid, it is also served during other traditional ceremonies—for example, those accompanying the birth of a child, such as the ‘aqīqah, the cutting of the hair of a newborn seven days after birth.

A simple, yet rich dish, often eaten without other complementary dishes, it is traditionally served at breakfast and is also given to women in labor.

== Etymology ==
The name asida is derived from the Arabic root عصد (ʿ-ṣ-d), associated with twisting or kneading.

== History ==
One of the earliest documented recipes for asida is found in a tenth century Arabic cookbook by Ibn Sayyar al-Warraq called Kitab al-Ṭabīḫ (Arabic: كتاب الطبيخ, The Book of Dishes). It was described as a thick pudding of dates cooked with clarified butter (samn). A recipe for asida was also mentioned in an anonymous Hispano-Muslim cookbook dating to the 13th century. In the 13th and 14th centuries, in the mountainous region of the Rif along the Mediterranean coast of Morocco, a flour made from lightly grilled barley was used in place of wheat flour. A recipe for asida that adds argan seed oil was documented by Leo Africanus (c. 1465–1550), the Berber Muslim explorer known as Hasan al-Wazan in the muslim world. According to the French scholar Maxime Rodinson, asida were typical foods among the Bedouin of pre-Islamic and, probably, later times.

== Variations ==
=== Morocco ===
In the old city of Fez, vendors sell squares of cold semolina pudding sprinkled with sugar and cinnamon, usually consumed by children after school.

=== Libya ===
The Libyan variation of asida is served with a sweet syrup, usually date or carob syrup (rub), but also with honey, as well as melted butter around the asida itself.

=== Palestine ===
Asida (Aseeda) is made primarily as a dessert by Palestinians. It serves as a both a comfort food and a dish to mark special occasions. The dessert version is served with honey or date syrup, and for special occasions might see the addition of sauteed nuts and cinnamon. A savory dish also called asida but consisting of stewed wheat berries with lamb is made in at least one village in Palestine at times of mourning, attesting to the uniqueness and specificity of local food customs.

=== Tunisia ===
The Tunisian version of this dish is served with either a mixture of honey and butter or a hot chili pepper paste (harissa). The latter is more common later in the day and the former earlier. Asida is also commonly consumed with carob syrup or date syrup in southern parts of Tunisia.

=== Yemen ===
Aseedah or aseed (Arabic: عصيدة) is one of the staple dishes in Yemen and is usually served for lunch, dinner, or breakfast. Its ingredients include wholemeal wheat, boiling water, and salt as needed.

A pot of water is placed on high heat until boiling. Slowly, handfuls of wholemeal wheat are added and then mixed quickly with a large wooden spoon to avoid forming lumps. The process is repeated until the mixture is thick. Traditionally the cook lowers the pot to the floor where they hold the pot with their feet and stir vigorously. Finally, the hot, steaming dough is shaped using bare oiled hands and usually placed in a wide, wooden bowl.

Sometimes a depression is made in the middle of the shaped aseedah into which a hot chili tomato paste can be added or helba, a fenugreek mixture made with parsley and garlic. Lamb or a chicken stock is then poured around the aseedah. It is then served hot.

Aseedah can also be made using white, bleached wheat. Honey can be used instead of stock and chili/helba. It is a meal, using only boiled water, flour, and some salt. Typically it is smothered in beef soup or chicken or even lamb.

It is usually served hot and eaten with hands or spoons. Aseed is eaten particularly at lunchtime and during Ramadan.

=== Ethiopia ===
The Ethiopian version of this dish is called genfo in Amharic. It is served with Ethiopian ghee (called niter kibbeh), berbere (an Ethiopian spice mix), yogurt, or even milk. This dish is served for breakfast.

=== Sudan ===
In Sudan, asida is a sorghum porridge. It is popular during Ramadan, and is often served with a meat-and-tomato sauce.

== See also ==
- List of Middle Eastern dishes
- Arab cuisine
- Berber cuisine
- Arab Indonesian cuisine
- List of puddings
- Kue asida
