= Lūʻau =

Traditional Hawaiian feast

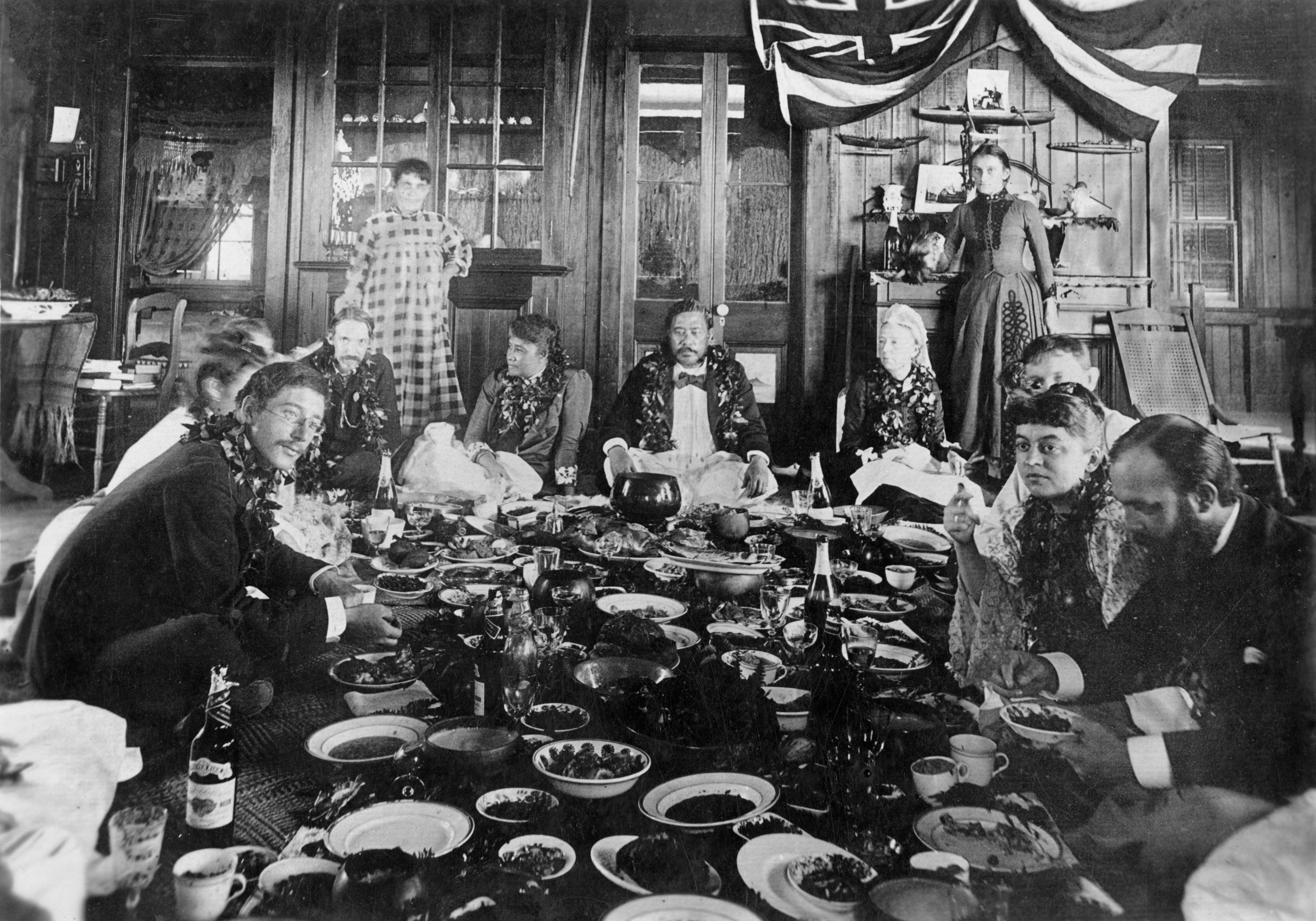
Royal Luau thrown by King Kalākaua with Robert Louis Stevenson and Queen Liliʻuokalani, 1889

A lūʻau, often anglicized as luau (/ˈluː.aʊ/, LOO-ow), is a traditional Hawaiian party or feast that is usually accompanied by entertainment. It often features Native Hawaiian cuisine with foods such as poi, kālua puaʻa (kālua pig), poke, lomi salmon, lomi ʻōʻio, ʻopihi, and haupia, and is often accompanied with beer and entertainment such as traditional Hawaiian music, kanikapila, and hula. Among people from Hawaii, the concepts of "lūʻau" and "party" are often blended, resulting in graduation lūʻau, wedding lūʻau, baby lūʻau, and birthday lūʻau.

== History ==
In ancient Hawaiʻi, men and women ate meals separately, according to the religious kapu (taboo) system which governed the way of life of Native Hawaiians in every aspect. Commoners and women were not allowed to eat foods that were rarely eaten or foods that were only served during special occasions. However, in 1819, King Kamehameha II performed the act of eating with the women, thus ending the kapu, and entering the period called the ʻAi Noa. Messengers were then sent over the islands announcing that eating was free and the kapu had fallen. This is when the lūʻau parties were first created, dinners or smaller gatherings called pāʻina or larger feasts called ʻahaʻaina.

The modern name goes back at least to 1856, when so used by the Pacific Commercial Advertiser. It referenced the wedding celebration of King Kamehameha IV and Queen Emma: “On the following day the palace grounds were thrown open to the native population, large numbers of whom visited the King and Queen, and partook of a luau (or native feast), prepared for them. A luau was also served up at the residence of Dr. Rooke.”

== Food ==
The modern name comes from a food often served at a lūʻau: lūʻau stew, a stew that is made with lūʻau (lit. young taro leaves) and usually consist of octopus ("squid") or chicken, and coconut milk. However, the highlight of many lūʻau is the kālua puaʻa, a whole pig that is slow-cooked in an imu (earth oven). Another dish that is served is poi, made from the roots of taro. This feast was usually served on the floor, on the mats often decorated with large centerpieces typically made of tī leaves (Cordyline fruticosa). Utensils were never present during a lūʻau; everything was eaten by hand. The thickness of poi was often identified by the number of fingers needed to eat it: "three-finger" poi has the thinness of applesauce; "two-finger", thickness of pudding, or the thickest, "one-finger poi" often non-diluted and non-fermented freshly pounded taro called paʻiʻai.

A traditional lūʻau consists of food such as:

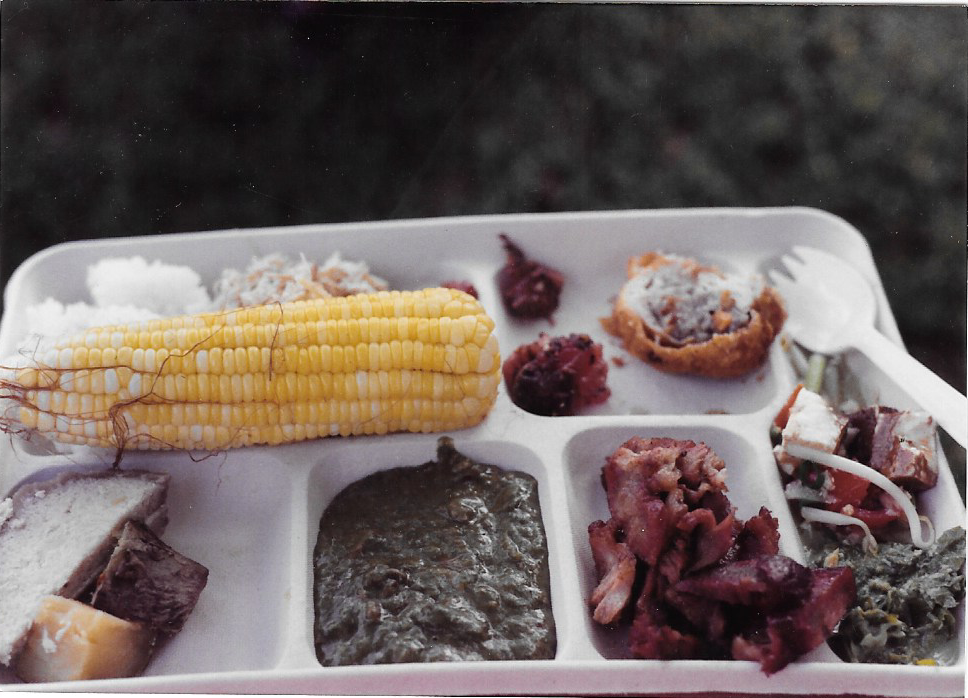
Plate at a wedding lūʻau in Kāneʻohe, Oʻahu in 1996

- Chicken long rice
- Haupia
- ʻUala
- Hawaiian rolls
- Kālua puaʻa (Hawaiian roast pig)
- Kōʻelepālau
- Kūlolo
- Laulau
- Lūʻau stew
- Lomi ʻōʻio
- Lomi salmon
- Pepeieʻe
- Piele
- Poi
- Poke
- Tropical fruits

== Lūʻau-themed parties ==
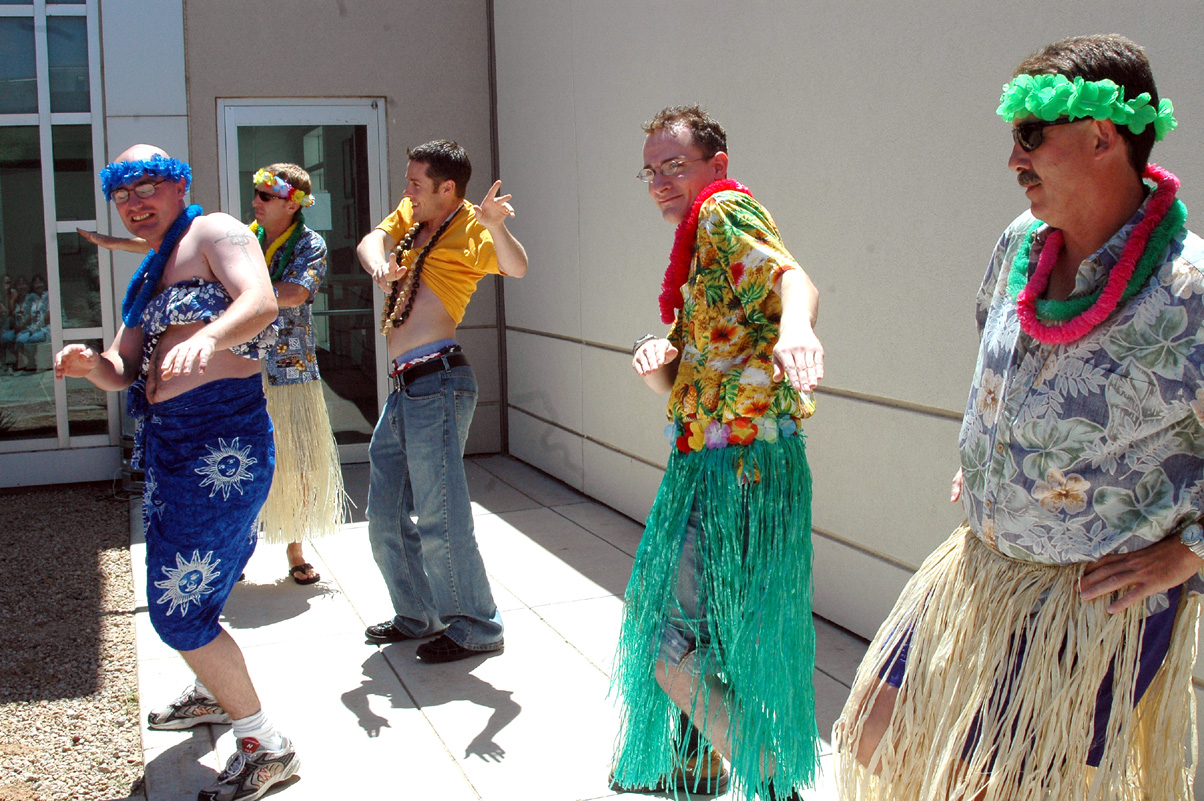
Lūʻau-themed party at Marine Corps Air Station Yuma

Lūʻau-themed or Hawaiian-themed parties vary in their range of dedication to Hawaiian traditions. For example, some extravagant affairs go so far as to ship food from the islands, while others settle for artificial lei, Mai Tais, and a poolside atmosphere.

To have a lūʻau-themed party, it is essential to have an open area, such as a backyard, because lūʻau are celebrated under large tents in outdoor areas. Also a lei is a very common item in a lūʻau. A lei is a necklace made of plant material such as flowers, ferns, ti leaves, or kukui nuts (polished candlenut shells). At lūʻau-themed parties, the guests can be invited to make their own lei to wear. Live music and entertainment are often enjoyed, such as kanikapila style. The instruments used are typically the ukulele, guitar and sometimes drums. There are also often hula dancers.

Some credit Donn Beach with the initial popularity and commercialization of lūʻaus within the continental United States. A Life article from 1946 graphically displays one of his famous lūʻaus that he held in Encino, California. In a 1986 interview Beach described his role in shaping private, home based lūʻaus into larger public affairs, where he included entertainment from singers such as Alfred Apaka.

== Gallery ==
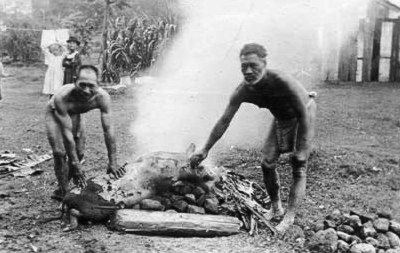
Hawaiians roast a pig for an 1890 lūʻau

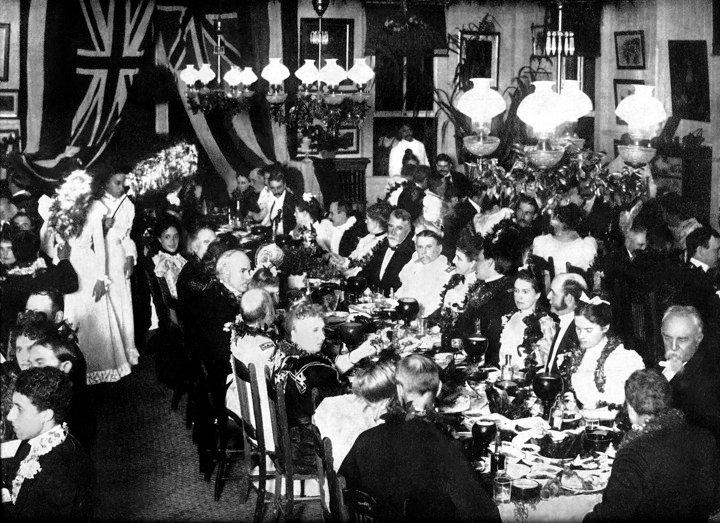
Princess Kaiulani's lūʻau banquet at ʻĀinahau for the U.S. Commissioners in 1898

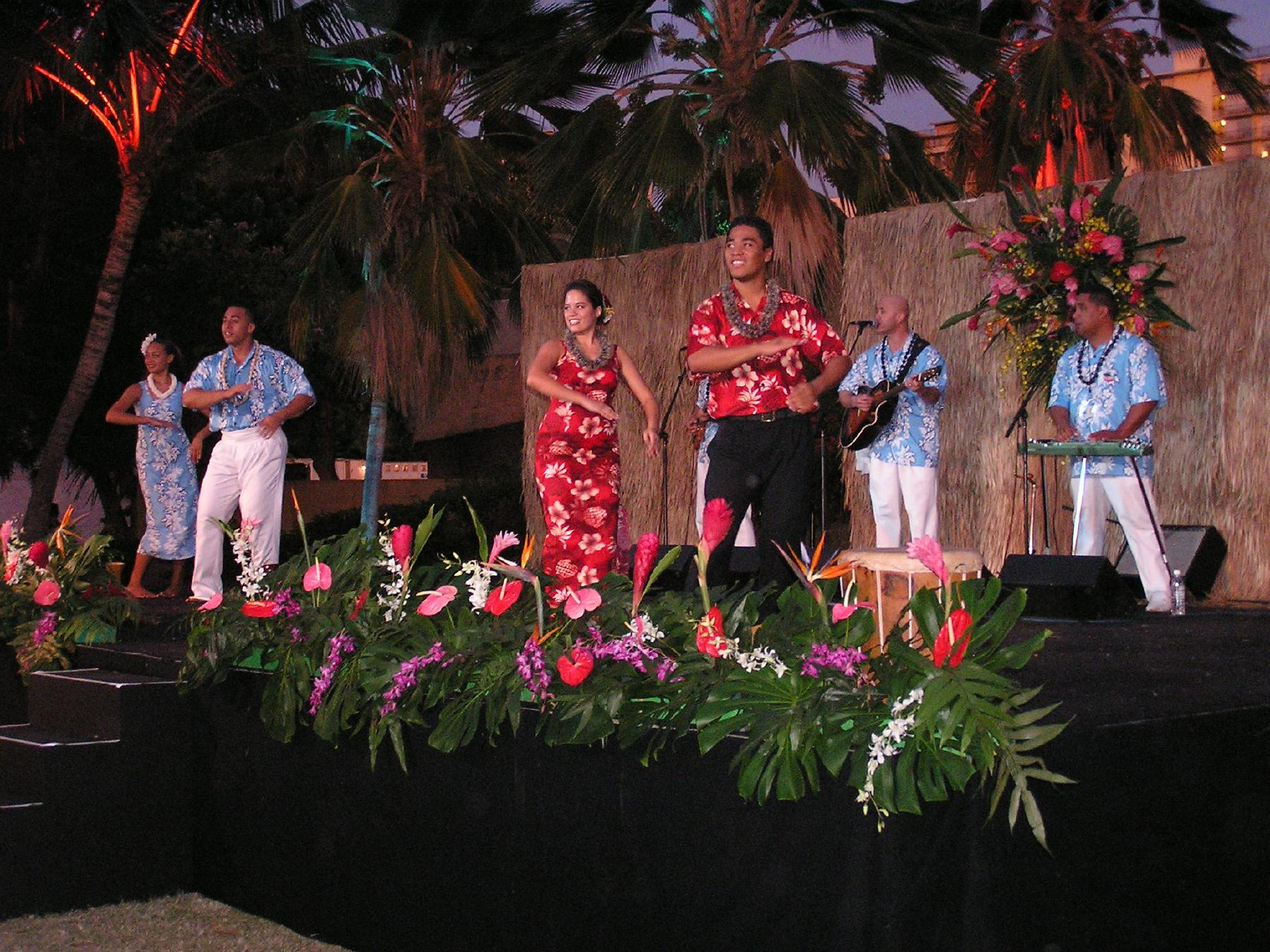
Dancers and musicians at a lūʻau for tourists
