= Oshaf =

Albanian dessert

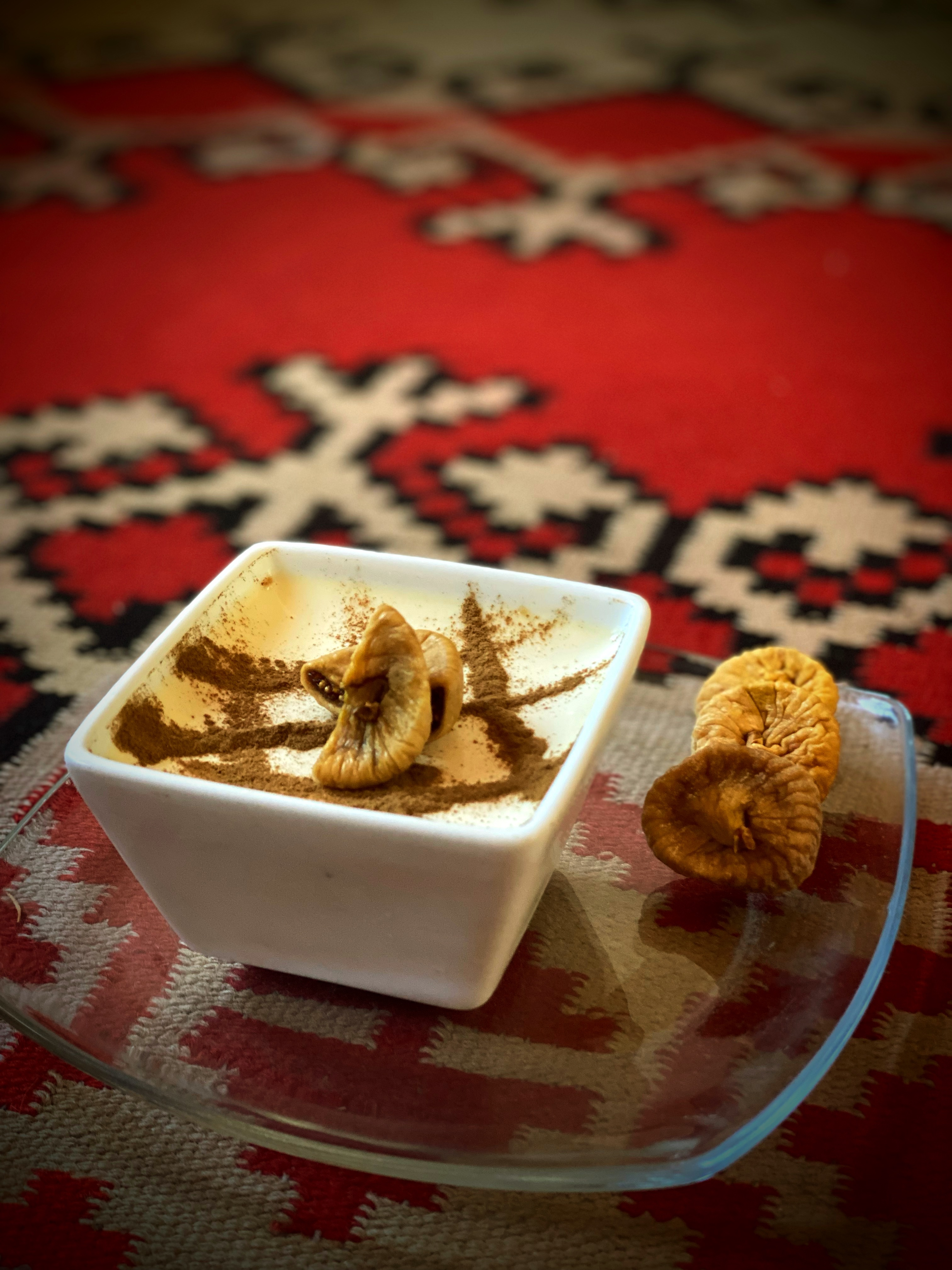
- A cup of traditional Oshaf
- Type: Pudding
- Course: Dessert
- Place of origin: Albania
- Region or state: Gjirokastër
- Associated cuisine: Albanian cuisine
- Serving temperature: warm, cold
- Main ingredients: sheep milk, dried figs, sugar, cinnamon

Oshaf is a traditional Albanian dessert originating from Gjirokastër, in southern Albania. It is a baked dairy pudding traditionally made from sheep milk, dried figs, sugar and cinnamon. The recipe has been passed on to generations of local households and is often served as a treat to visiting guests.

== Ingredients ==
A typical individual serving may use the following:

- 150 ml sheep milk
- 30 g dried figs
- 50 g sugar
- ground cinnamon

== Preparation ==
To prepare oshaf, the dried figs are chopped and combined with sheep milk and sugar. The mixture is divided into small heat-resistant bowls or ramekins baked until it thickens and the surface begins to brown. Cinnamon and occasionally ground cloves, are sprinkled over the dessert for additional flavor. Oshaf may be served warm, at room temperature or chilled.

Modern adaptations sometimes replace sheep milk with sheep-milk yogurt combined with sweetened condensed milk, producing a thicker and creamier variation of the traditional recipe.

== See also ==
- List of sweet puddings
