= Kūlolo =

Hawaiian dessert using coconut milk

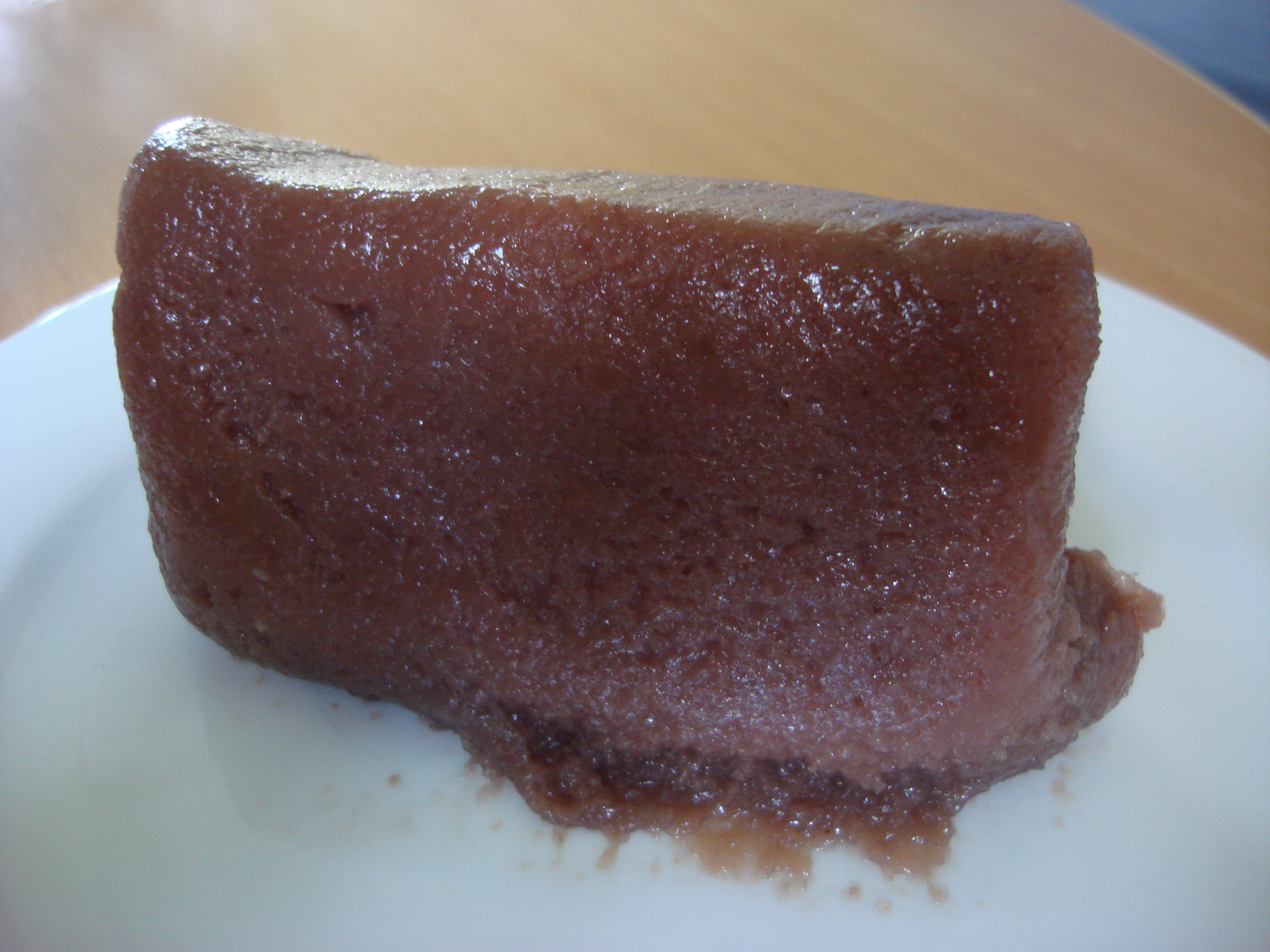
- Kūlolo, a pudding made from taro and coconut milk
- Alternative names: Piele, piepiele
- Type: Pudding
- Course: Dessert
- Place of origin: Hawaii
- Serving temperature: Fresh; room temperature
- Main ingredients: Taro, coconut
- Ingredients generally used: Sugar
- Variations: Piele, pepeieʻe
- Similar dishes: Kōʻelepālau, haupia

Kūlolo is a Hawaiian dish made with taro and coconut. Considered a pudding, kūlolo has a chewy and solid consistency like fudge or Southeast Asian dodol, with a flavor similar to caramel or Chinese nian gao. Because taro is widely cultivated on the island of Kauai, taro products such as kūlolo are often associated with the island. It is a well-beloved dish well documented by many non-Hawaiians since the late 1800s, sometimes found during festive occasions like lūʻau.

== Etymology ==
The Hawaiian word kūlolo is a cognate of the Eastern Polynesian term "roro" which describes "brains matter, bone marrow; spongy matter," which itself is derived from Nuclear Polynesian "lolo" which describes "coconut cream or oil", while "kū" is a qualitative and stative prefix.

== Preparation ==
Traditional kūlolo recipes call for wrapping a mixture of grated taro and coconut cream in ti leaves and baking it in an imu (underground oven) for 6 to 8 hours. Modern recipes call for baking the mixture in a baking pan in an oven, or steaming in a pressure cooker.

== Variations ==
Piele (antiquated piepiele) is another name associated with puddings made in a similar manner to kūlolo. It also refers to the grated or pulverized raw ingredients—including taro, sweet potato, breadfruit, yam, or banana—that are mixed with coconut milk to make this dish. Pepeieʻe (or paipaieʻe) is a baked pudding made from the overripe fruits of banana or breadfruit mixed with coconut milk. Kōʻelepālau is a similar pudding made with sweet potato and coconut milk. However, the coconut milk is added after the sweet potatoes are cooked separately.

== Today ==
While kūlolo remains fairly popular, it is unclear why piele and pepeieʻe fell out of favor in modern times. All these puddings, including kōʻelepālau and haupia, were well-documented throughout the late 1800s to early 1900s, including by the famed author Robert Louis Stevenson during his visits.

A powdered kūlolo mix using dehydrated taro powder is available for those who do not have access to fresh taro. Kūlolo is also found as a filling in lumpia, as an accompaniment to, and as a flavor for, ice cream.

== See also ==
- Dodol – Southeast Asian sweet toffee
- Haupia – Polynesian coconut milk pudding
- Po'e – Polynesian pudding
