= Sweet potato haupia pie =

Hawaiian dessert

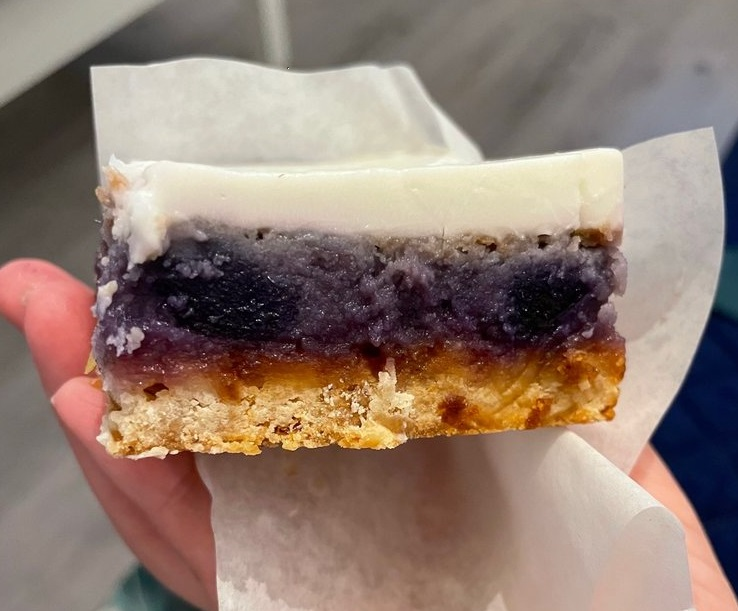
- Haupia layer on top, sweet potato center, macadamia nut shortbread crust
- Alternative names: Okinawan sweet potato haupia pie, Purple Sweet potato haupia, "Ube" haupia pie
- Type: Dessert bar
- Course: Dessert
- Place of origin: US
- Region or state: Hawaii
- Serving temperature: Cold
- Main ingredients: Okinawan sweet potato, Haupia, Macadamia nuts

Sweet potato haupia pie is a dish of Hawaiian cuisine.

It is a pie made with sweet potato filling and topped with a layer of haupia (coconut pudding) and uses a macadamia nut shortbread base or short crust. Although it is called a "pie", it is usually prepared in rectangular pans as dessert bars, although a pie dish (or tart pan) can be used.

== Background ==
Sweet potatoes have been a staple in Hawaii for hundreds of years and have been used in various recipes. This particular dish was inspired by sweet potato pie originating from the Southern United States. However, it uses Okinawan sweet potatoes, also known as Okinawan purple sweet potatoes or Hawaiian purple sweet potatoes, a popular cultivar widely grown in Hawaii which makes for a vibrant purple filling. The Okinawan sweet potatoes are creamier than other varieties. The filling is usually absent of the warm spices commonly associated with Southern sweet potato pie. The sweet potato is often mislabeled or mistaken for ube which shares a purple color but has a distinct flavor of its own.

Although usually a dessert, sometimes it can even be eaten for breakfast.

== Preparation ==
The filling is made by boiling Okinawan purple sweet potatoes until tender, mashing them, and combining them with sugar, coconut milk, evaporated milk, melted butter, and vanilla extract. This mixture is then poured into the crust and baked until set. For the haupia layer, coconut milk, water, sugar, and cornstarch are cooked until thickened and then spread over the cooled sweet potato layer. The pie is refrigerated until the haupia layer is firm and typically served with optional toppings like whipped cream and toasted coconut flakes.

== Popularity ==
McDonald's at one point offered its own version of the pie in Hawaii. Other shops on the island also offer the dish. The dish can also be found in the mainland United States like in San Francisco. However, in general this pie is found exclusively in Hawaii.

Right before one Thanksgiving, Google released data that showed that haupia pie was the most commonly searched pie in the state of Hawaii.

== Variations ==
In addition to the pie and bar form, there is also a cheesecake form as well.

== Gallery ==
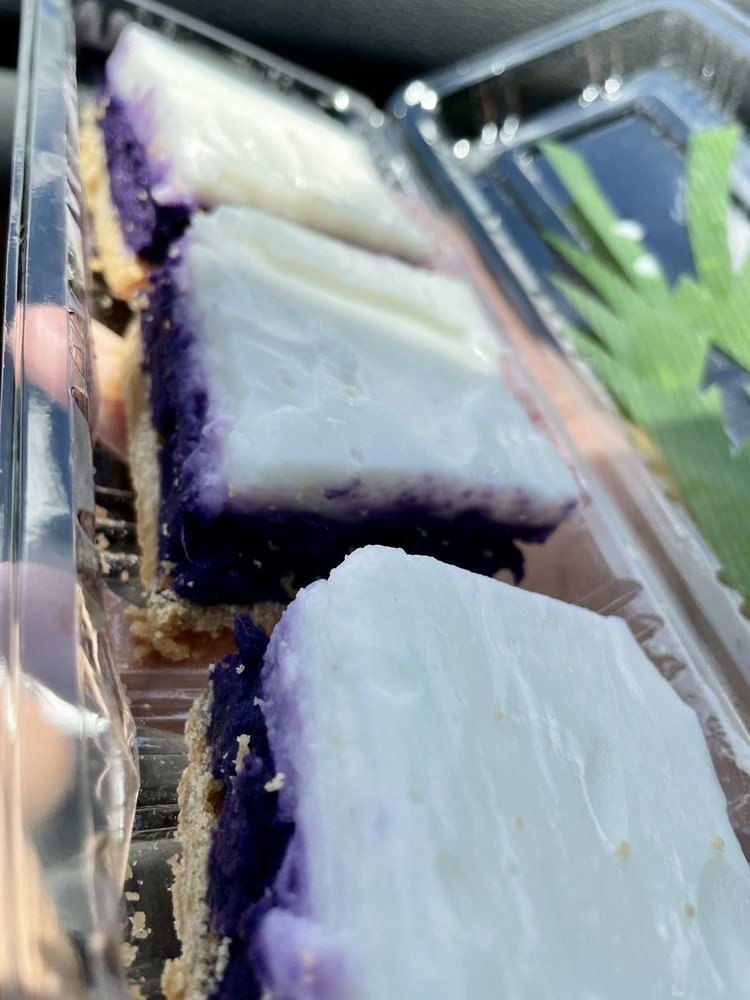
Pie in bar form

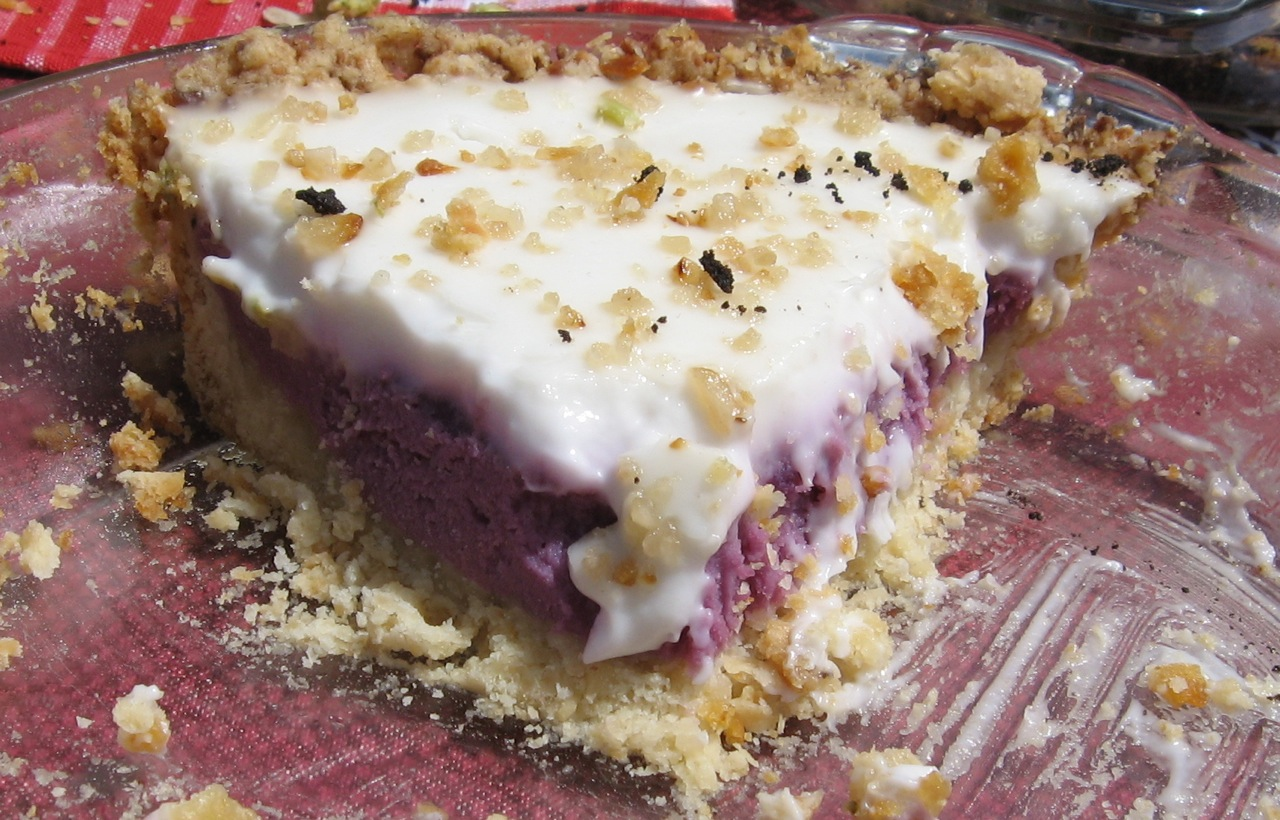
Baked in pie dish

== See also ==
- Chocolate haupia pie
- Kōʻelepālau – Hawaiian sweet potato pudding
- List of sweet potato dishes
- List of Hawaiian dishes
