= Kamir =

Javanese traditional bread

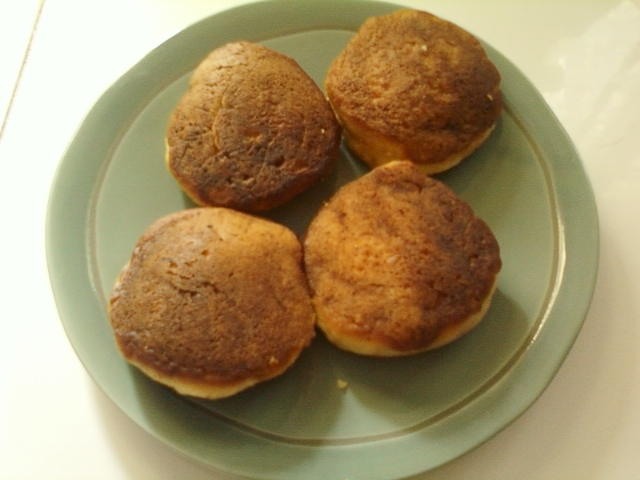
- A plate of kamir.
- Type: Bread, pancake, kue
- Course: Breakfast
- Place of origin: Indonesia
- Region or state: Central Java
- Created by: Arab-Javanese

Kamir, also known as khamir or samir (Javanese: ꦏꦩꦶꦂ, romanized: kamir; Pegon: كامير) is a round-shaped bread that almost similar to apem or pancake, consists of flour, butter, and egg mixture, sometimes mixed with other fillings ingredients such as banana, tapai, strawberry, pineapple, jackfruit, cheese, and chocolate.

This bread is known in Arab-Javanese community in Indonesia, especially Pemalang Regency, Central Java.

== Description ==
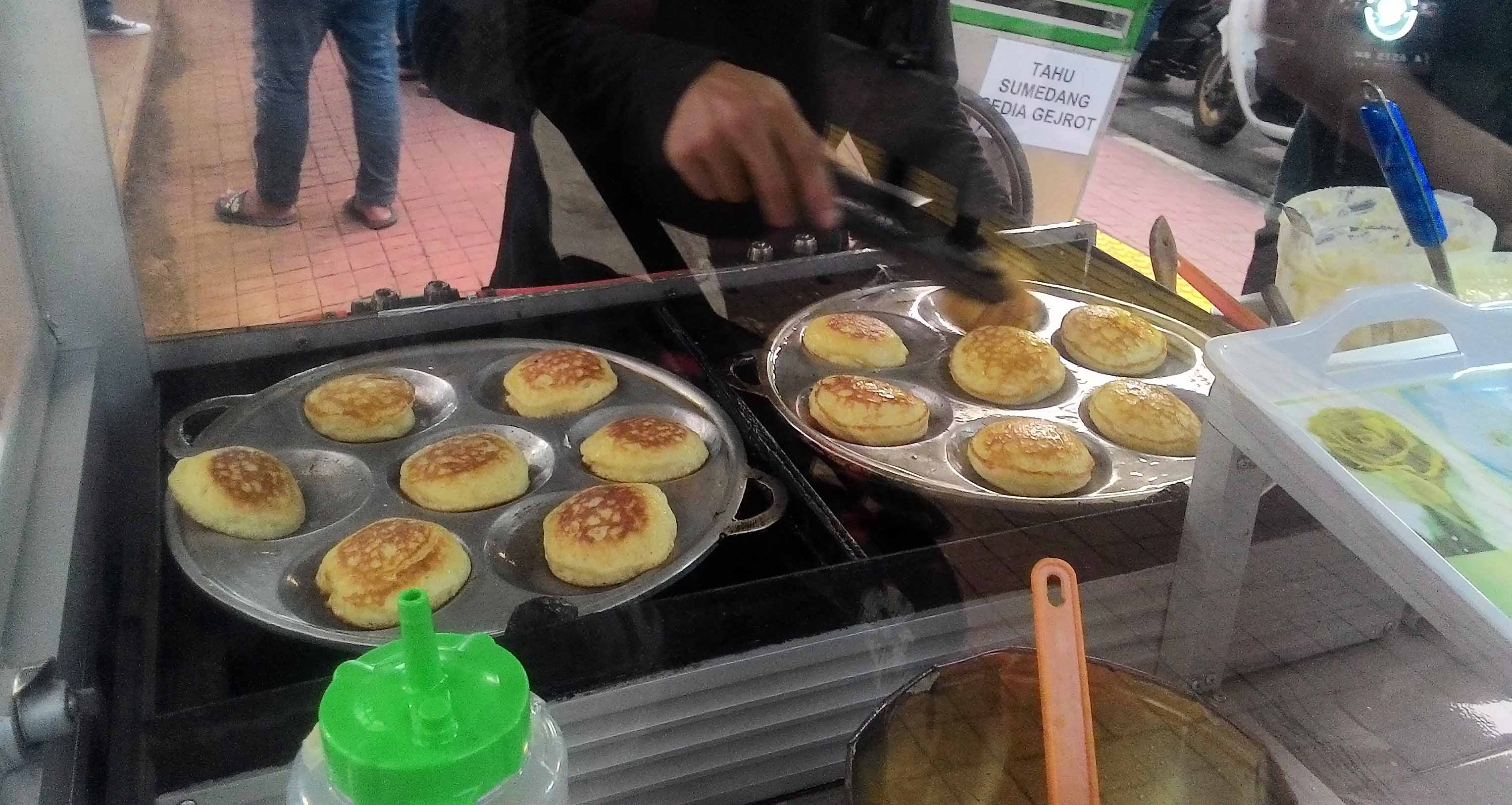
Cooking kue samir pancake.

This bread or cake is round-shaped, flat brown and almost resembles to apem or pancake but slightly larger and slender. The size is variative, the largest size up to the size of a dinner plate, while the smallest resemble the size of a small sauce bowl.

== See also ==
- Pukis, a similar Indonesian hotcake
- Dorayaki, a similar Japanese small pancake
- Cuisine of Indonesia
- Arab Indonesian cuisine
- Javanese cuisine
