= Chocolate haupia pie =

Hawaiian dessert

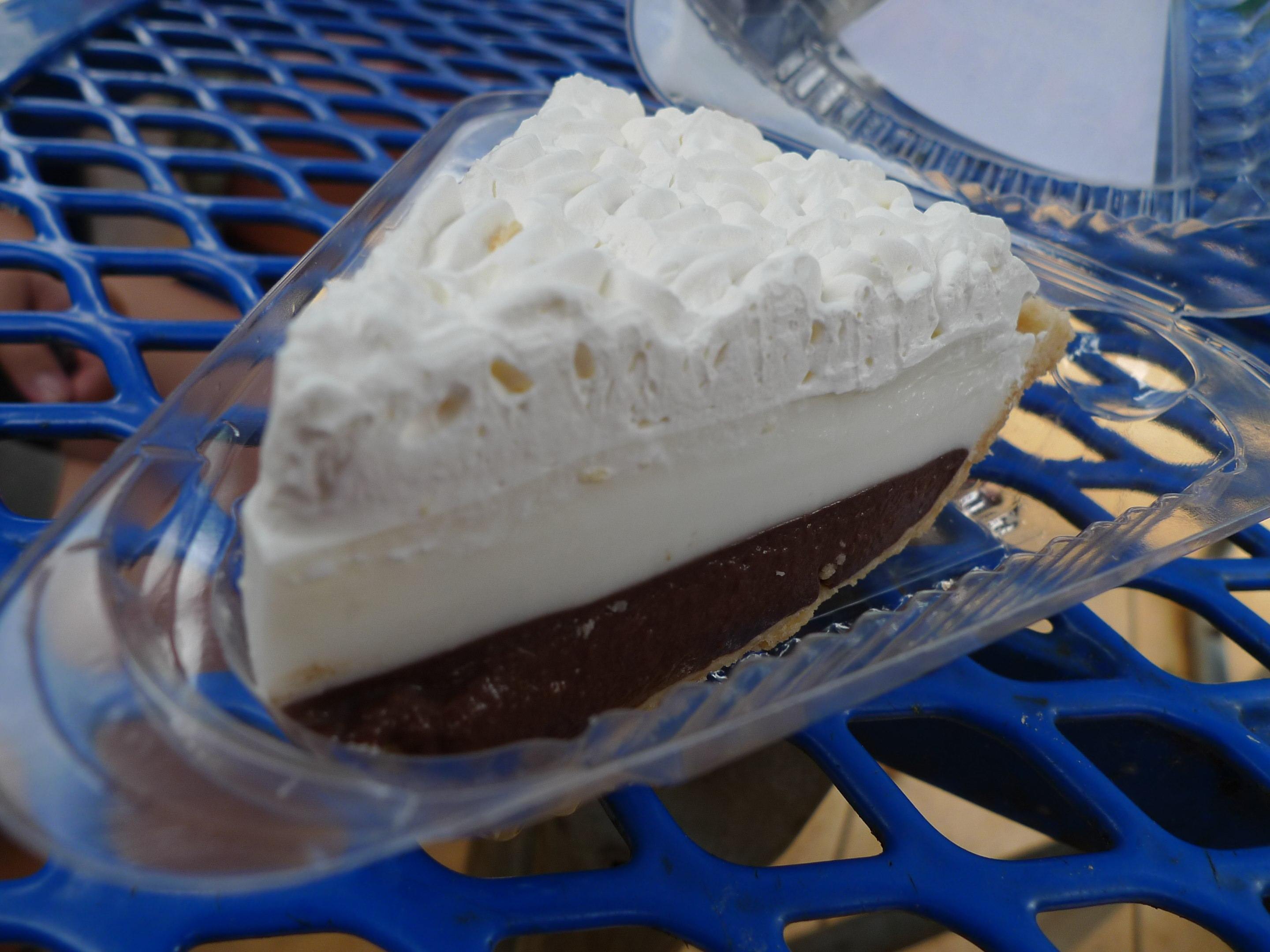
- Haupia layer on top, chocolate pudding center, pie crust
- Alternative names: Chocolate haupia cream pie
- Type: Cream pie
- Course: Dessert
- Place of origin: United States
- Region or state: Hawaii
- Serving temperature: Cold
- Main ingredients: Chocolate, Haupia

Chocolate haupia pie is a dish of Hawaiian cuisine.

It is made with a chocolate pudding layer inside of a pie crust, topped with a layer of haupia, and then finally a layer of whipped cream. It was popularized by Ted's Bakery on the North Shore of O'ahu beginning in the late 1980s.

== Background ==
Cacao has been grown on Hawaii for decades, and recently chocolate has been produced commercially there. Haupia is a traditional dish on Hawaii.

== Preparation ==
The base of the pie typically consists of a baked crust. The top layer of the pie is haupia, made by cooking a mixture of coconut milk, water, sugar, and cornstarch until it thickens to a smooth, pudding-like consistency.

The bottom layer introduces chocolate, made by melting semi-sweet chocolate chips with coconut milk. This chocolate mixture is combined with the remaining haupia and poured on the pie crust. Once the pie is assembled, it is refrigerated to allow both the haupia and chocolate layers to set.

The pie is typically finished with a layer of whipped cream, made by whipping heavy cream with sugar until it forms soft peaks.

== Popularity ==
Ted's Bakery is a bakery on O'ahu that is known for this pie, at one point making over one thousand of them each week.

It has spread outside Hawaii to other places such as San Francisco.

Right before one Thanksgiving, Google released data that showed that haupia pie was the most commonly searched pie in the state of Hawaii.

== Variations ==
It can sometimes be served in bite-sized square pieces rather than an entire pie.

== See also ==
- List of Hawaiian dishes
- Sweet potato haupia pie
