= Po'e =

Polynesian pudding

Poʻe
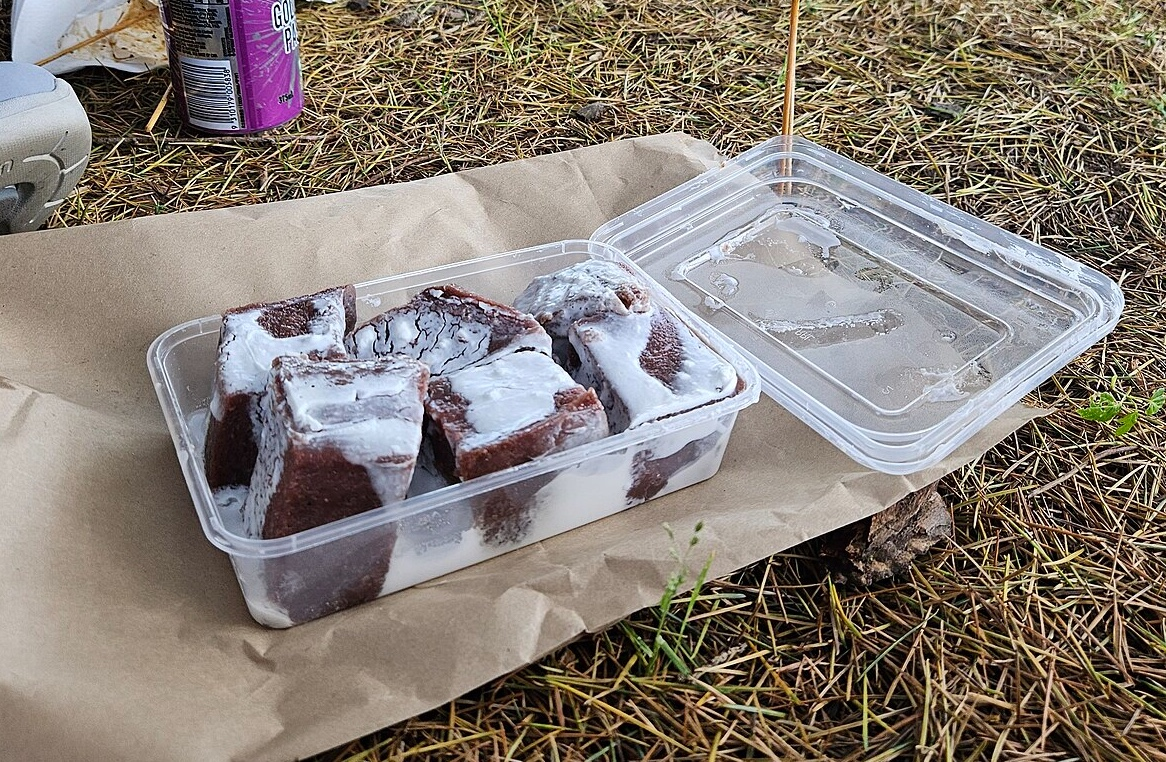
- Alternative names: Poke
- Type: Pudding
- Course: Dessert
- Place of origin: Polynesia
- Region or state: Cook Islands, Easter Island, French Polynesia
- Main ingredients: Fruit purée, starch, coconut cream

Po‘e or poke is a Polynesian pudding usually eaten as a dessert.

== Etymology ==
The Tahitian word po'e is derived from the proto-Polynesian root poke which means "to mix", "to knead". It is still called poke in all Polynesian languages except in the Tahitian language and in the Austral language on the island of Raivavae where the glottal stop (written as an apostrophe ') has replaced the voiceless velar stop (k).

== Preparation ==
Traditionally po'e was made by cooking and mashing bananas into a smooth consistency and mixing together with arrowroot flour. The mixture was wrapped in banana leaves and baked in an earth oven until set into a pudding-like consistency, cut into smaller pieces and served together with coconut cream. Modern versions of the recipe replace bananas with other fruits such as papaya, mango or squash and using cassava or corn starch as the thickening agent.

== See also ==
- Kulolo – a traditional Hawaiian dessert, made from grated taro and coconut milk baked into a pudding
- Poi – a similar traditional banana dessert, from Samoa
