= Kue asida =

Indonesian pudding dessert

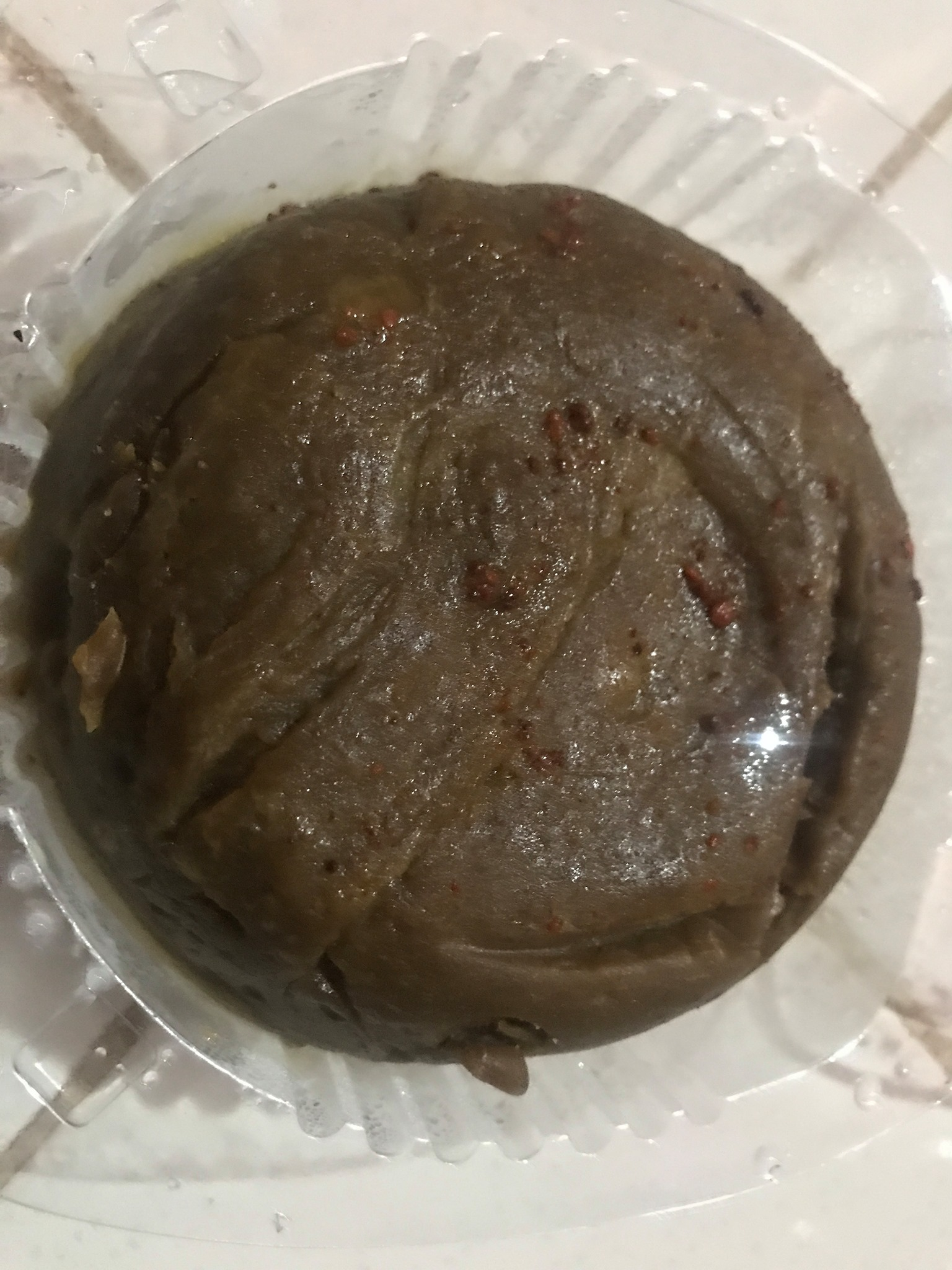
- Alternative names: Asida, asidah, dodol asida
- Type: Pudding, kue
- Course: Iftar, dessert, snack
- Place of origin: Indonesia
- Region or state: Maluku Islands
- Created by: Indonesians

Kue asida (Arabic: عصيدة, romanized: ‘aṣīdah; Jawi: اسيدا) is an Indonesian pudding dessert made of water with mixture of wheat flour, sugar, cinnamon, cardamom, butter and honey. This dessert is typical Moluccan cuisine and also found in Malay Indonesian and Arab Indonesian cuisine. It usually served during Ramadan for iftar. Kue asida is similar to dodol.

== Origin ==
The origin of kue asida is believed to be derived from the Middle Eastern asida that was introduced by Arab merchants throughout the Maluku Islands.

== See also ==
- Cuisine of Indonesia
- Arab Indonesian cuisine
- Malay cuisine
- Asida
- Kue
