= List of savoury puddings =

This is a list of notable savoury puddings, defined as a savoury dish consisting of various ingredients baked, steamed, or boiled into a solid mass.

== Puddings ==
Name	Image	Origin	Description
Black pudding		United Kingdom	A classic addition to the full breakfast, this is a sausage made from pig blood.
Blodpalt		Sweden	A use-up pudding made from meat waste and flour.
Chireta		Spain	A Spanish version of haggis.
Dock pudding		United Kingdom	Its main ingredients are the leaves of bistort (sometimes called "gentle dock" or "Passion dock," though it is not a member of the Rumex genus), together with oatmeal, nettles, onion, and seasoning to taste. Traditionally the pudding is fried in a frying pan along with bacon.
Drisheen		Ireland	Similar to black pudding.
Flummadiddle		United States, originally United Kingdom	A baked main course pudding consisting of stale bread, pork fat, molasses, and spices including cinnamon, allspice, and cloves
Goetta		United States	Ground pork and oats boiled together with onions and seasoning, congealed into a loaf, sliced and fried as a breakfast item or sandwich filling.
Groaty pudding		United Kingdom	Made with soaked groats.
Haggis		Scotland	A sausage-like pudding made from a sheep's stomach filled with lamb pieces and oats
Hasty pudding		United States	Made from corn and pork fat
Kačamak		Southern Europe	The dish is made of cornmeal. Potato, feta cheese or kaymak are sometimes added. Similar to the Italian polenta and Romanian mămăligă, it is prepared by boiling the mixture until it is thick or runny, depending on taste, and then mashing while the pot is still on the fire.
Moin moin		Nigeria	It is a steamed bean pudding made from a mixture of washed and peeled black-eyed beans, onions and fresh black pepper. It is a protein-rich food that is a staple in Nigeria.
Ngerima		Kenya	A sausage like pudding made from a Cow's stomach filled with meat pieces. Similar to Haggis
Pease pudding		United Kingdom	Porridge made by boiling legumes
Pudding corn		United States	Made with corn and sometimes vegetables in small amounts.
Rag pudding		United Kingdom	A steamed pudding, filled with mince and onions.
Red pudding		Scotland	A battered sausage served in fish and chip shops. It is similar to the saveloy.
Scrapple		United States	A breakfast pudding made from pork and bread scraps, often with mushrooms or onion.
Spoonbread		United States	A savoury soufflé-like dish based on cornmeal rather than wheat flour, served as a side dish.
Steak and kidney pudding			Meat and gravy, in a suet pastry crust.
Sweet potato and coconut pudding		Kenya	Made with sweet potatoes and coconut milk.
Tavuk göğsü		Turkey	Made with chicken and milk.
Tiết canh		Vietnam	A traditional dish of blood and cooked meat.
White pudding		United Kingdom	Served with or as a substitute for black pudding, this is another common full breakfast addition, as shown in the picture.
Yorkshire pudding		United Kingdom	Batter cooked in roast dripping. It is a quintessential addition to the Sunday roast in some regions.

== See also ==
- List of baked goods
- List of sweet puddings
