= Kanikapila =

Kanikapila is a style of Hawaiian music produced in an impromptu jam session, most commonly taking place at a beach, or family gathering. The term comes from kani which means sound. and pila which means any string instrument in the Hawaiian language.

Over the last few decades it formed into a conceptual style reflecting more emphasis on acoustic instruments including the ukulele and free following speed to reflect the emotion of the players. The term has started making its way in the dialog of mainland US musicians as well.

One way that the kanikapila style music has made its mark in popular culture is songs like "Somewhere over the Rainbow" by Israel Kamakawiwo'ole where he takes two songs ( "Somewhere Over the Rainbow" and "What a Wonderful World" ) mashes them together to form an entirely new song. This is common element of the kanikapila style.

It is a popular custom to end kanikapila sessions the same way with the song "Hawaii Aloha" written by 19th century Christian minister, Lorenzo Lyons. Kanikapila groups include the Experience Paradise Project.

== Bibliography ==
- Clark, Gregory. "“A Child Born of the Land”: The Rhetorical Aesthetic of Hawaiian Song." Rhetoric Society Quarterly 42.3 (2012): 251-270.
- Gonsalves, Dennis. "The wayward Hawaiian boy returns home." Annual Review of Phytopathology 53 (2015): 1-17.
- Kruse, Nathan B. "‘without u, it’s just kulele’: expressions of leisure and ‘ohana in an intergenerational ukulele club." International Journal of Community Music 6.2 (2013): 153-167.
