= Arab Indonesian cuisine =

Cuisine of the people of Arab Indonesians

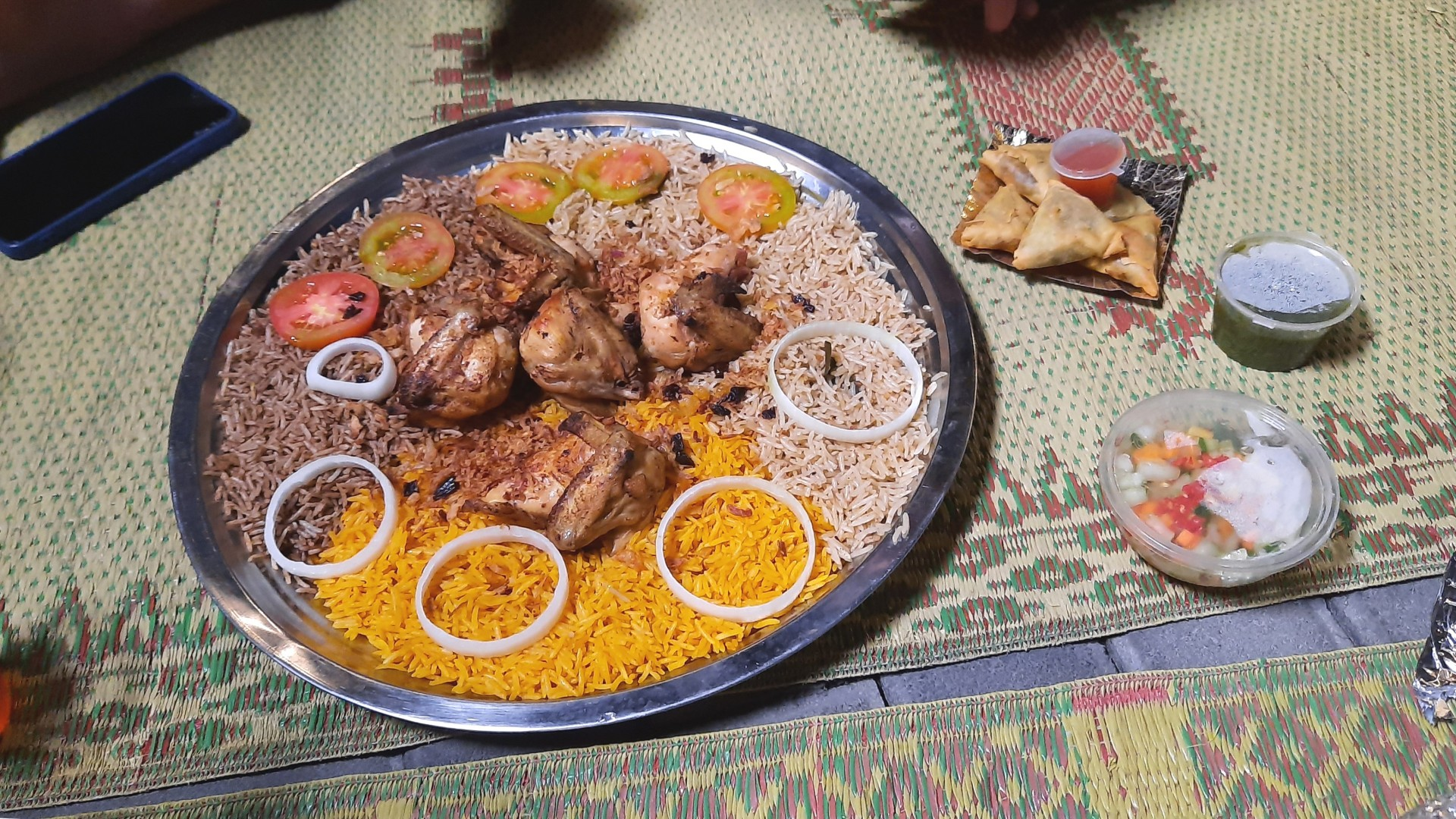
Nasi kebuli with chicken, a common Arab Indonesian dish

Arab Indonesian cuisine (Indonesian: Masakan Arab-Indonesia) is characterized by the mixture of Middle Eastern cuisine with local Indonesian-style cuisine. Arab Indonesians brought their legacy of Arab cuisine—originally from Hadhramaut, Hejaz, Sudan and Egypt—and modified some of the dishes with the addition of Indonesian ingredients. The Arabs arrived in the Nusantara archipelago to trade and spread Islam. In Java, since the 18th century AD, most Arab traders settled on the north coast and diffused with indigenous cultures, thus affecting the local cuisine culture, especially in the use of goat and mutton meat as well as ghee in cooking.

== List of Arab Indonesian foods ==
This list also includes Indonesian dishes that has experienced of acculturation or assimilation to Arab cuisine.

=== Dishes ===
- Asinan nanas, pineapple in spicy and sour sauce.
- Fahsa, stew dish with a base of brown meat stew called marak, a dollop of fenugreek froth, and sahawiq.
- Gulai, curry dish whose main ingredients might be poultry, goat meat, beef, mutton, various kinds of offal, fish and seafood, or vegetables such as cassava leaves and unripe jackfruit.
- Hummus, a dip, spread, or savory dish made from cooked, mashed chickpeas blended with tahini, lemon juice, and garlic.
- Bubur harisah, a porridge-like dish.
- Kamir, a round-shaped bread similar to appam, consisting of a flour, butter, and egg mixture.
- Kofta, meatballs or meatloaf of minced or ground meat—usually beef, chicken, or lamb—mixed with spices or onions.
- Manakish, pizza-like flatbread.
- Marak, goat meat dish with pumpkin and chicken meat.
- Murtabak, stuffed pancake or pan-fried bread, sometimes filled with beef and scallions.
- Naan, a leavened, oven-baked flatbread. It is usually eaten with an array of sauces such as curries.
- Nasi kabsah, mixed rice dish.
- Nasi kebuli, steamed rice dish cooked in goat broth, milk, and ghee. Usually served during Mawlid.
- Nasi gonjleng, steamed rice with spices, very similar in flavor to nasi kebuli.
- Nasi goreng domba, mutton fried rice.
- Nasi goreng kambing, spicy fried rice with goat meat, cooked in ghee.
- Nasi samin, fragrant yellow rice dish cooked in spices
- Nasi mandi, rice dish made from rice, meat (lamb, goat or chicken), and a mixture of spices.
- Nasi minyak, cooked rice with ghee and spices.
- Rabeg, mutton dish.
- Roti maryam, roti canai; influenced by Indian paratha.
- Roti arab, yeast-leavened round flatbread baked from wheat flour, sometimes with a pocket.
- Saltah, stew dish with a base of brown meat stew called marak, a dollop of fenugreek froth, and sahawiq. Rice, potatoes, scrambled eggs, and vegetables are common additions to saltah.
- Sate kambing, a satay variant made of goat meat.
- Shawarma, roasted meat, especially when cooked on a revolving spit and shaved for serving in sandwiches.
- Tabbouleh, vegetarian salad.
- Tongseng, a dish of goat meat, mutton or beef stew in a curry-like soup with vegetables and sweet soy sauce.

=== Desserts and snacks ===
- Asida, Moluccan pudding dish made up of a cooked wheat flour lump of dough, sometimes with added butter or honey. It is commonly served during Ramadan.
- Falafel, spiced mashed chickpeas formed into balls or fritters and deep-fried.
- Ka'ak, biscuit or cookie shaped into a ring.
- Kaak, small circular biscuit.
- Katayef, a sweet dumpling filled with cream or nuts.
- Maamoul, filled pastry or cookie made with dates, nuts such as pistachios or walnuts and occasionally almonds, or figs.
- Makmur, traditional Arab-Malay pastry, made from butter, ghee and flour. Usually served during the special occasion of Eid ul-Fitr.
- Samosa, a fried or baked dumpling with a savoury filling, such as spiced potatoes, onions, peas, or lentils.

== Gallery ==
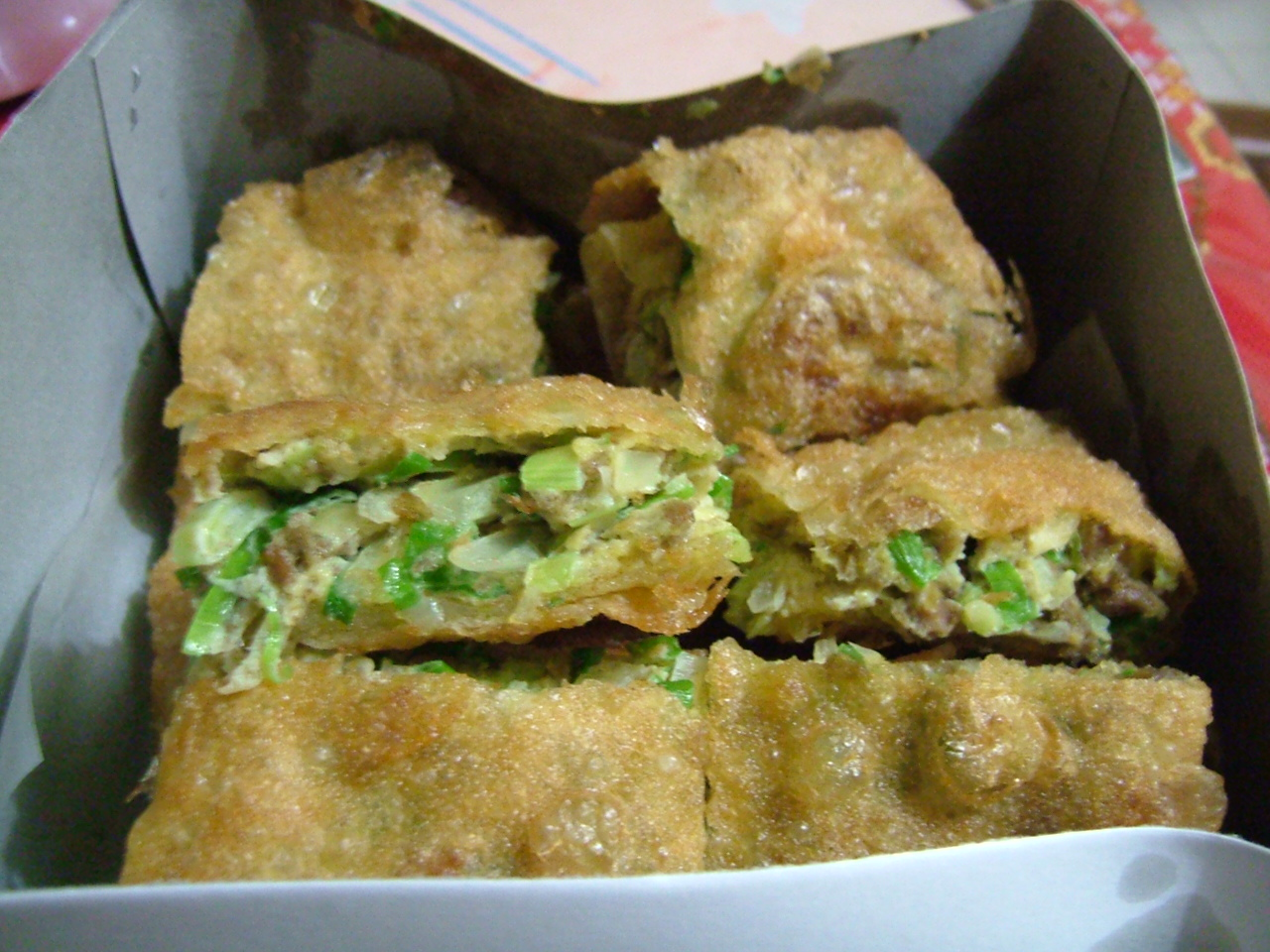
Martabak

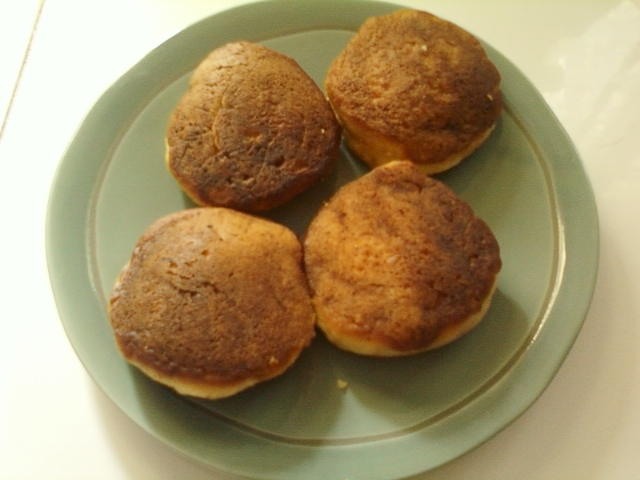
Kamir

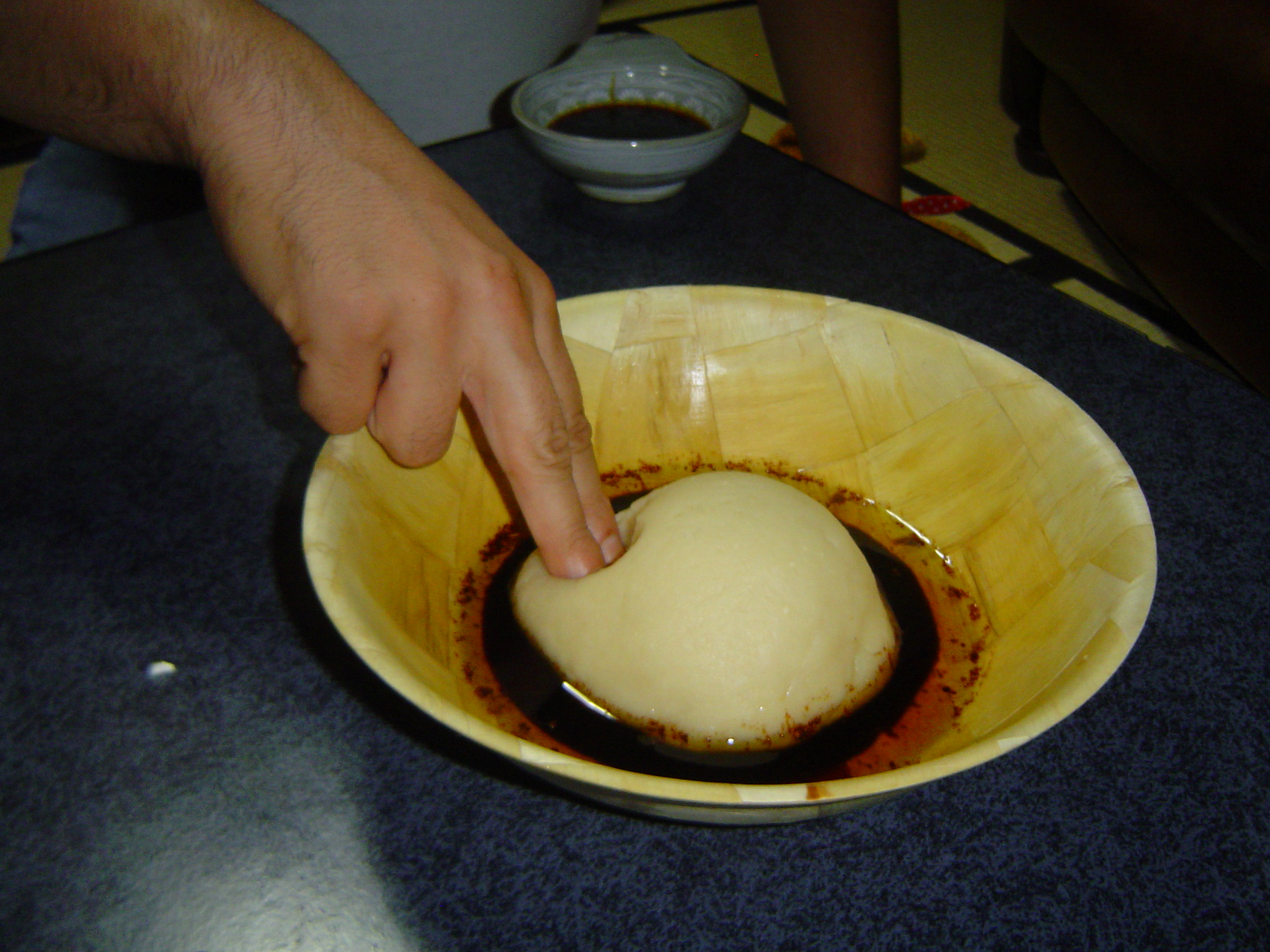
Kue asida

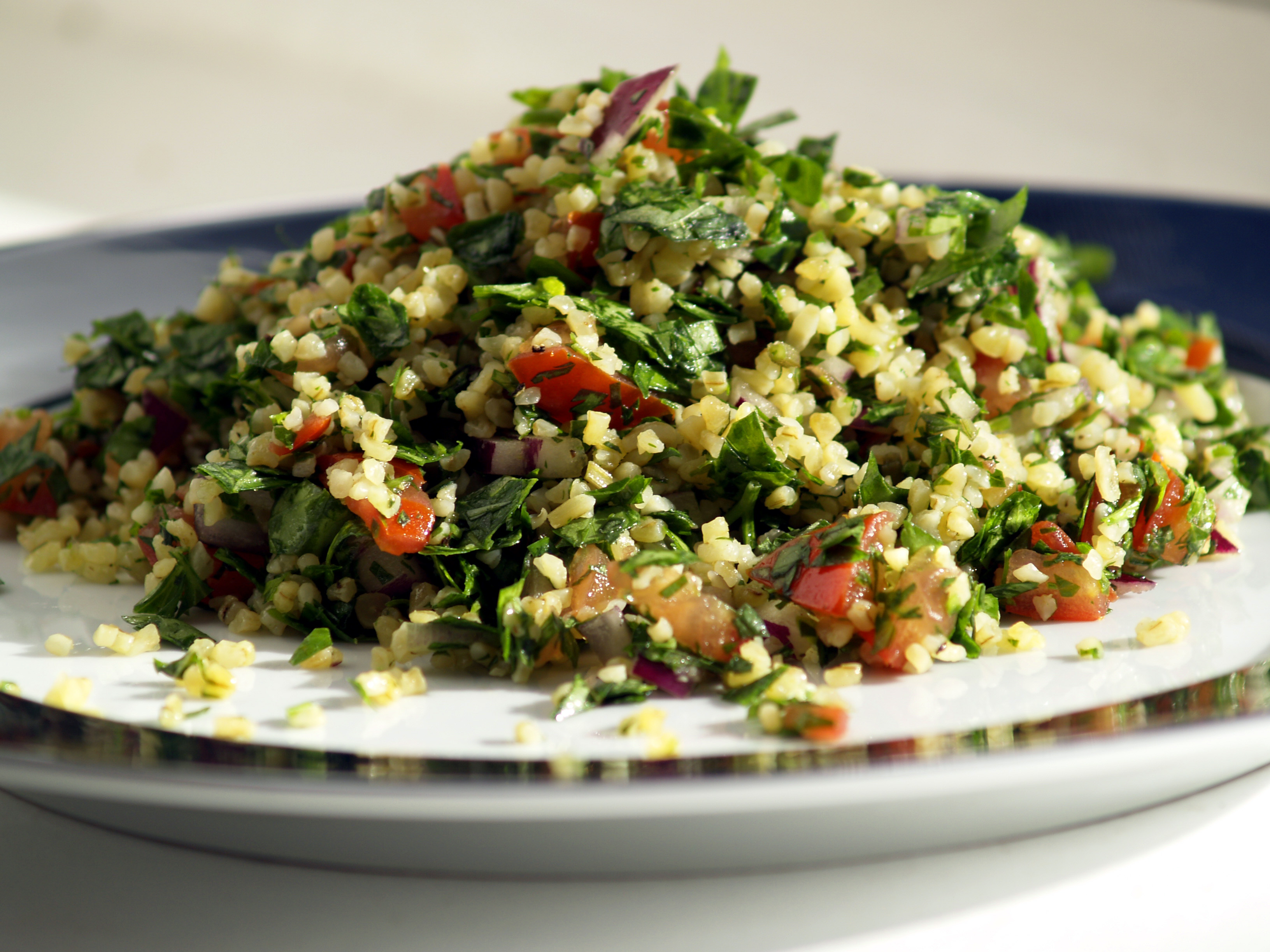
Tabbouleh

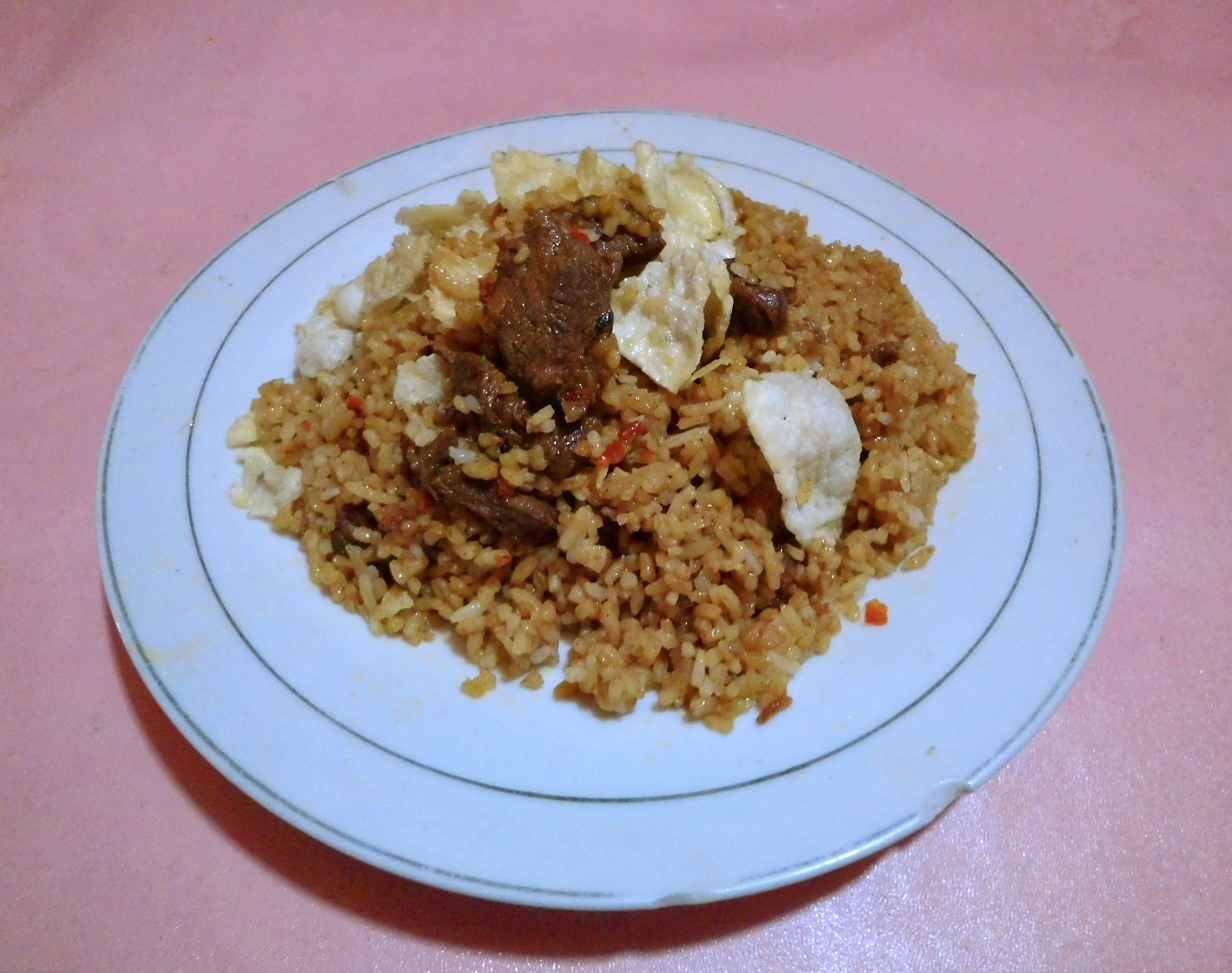
Nasi goreng kambing

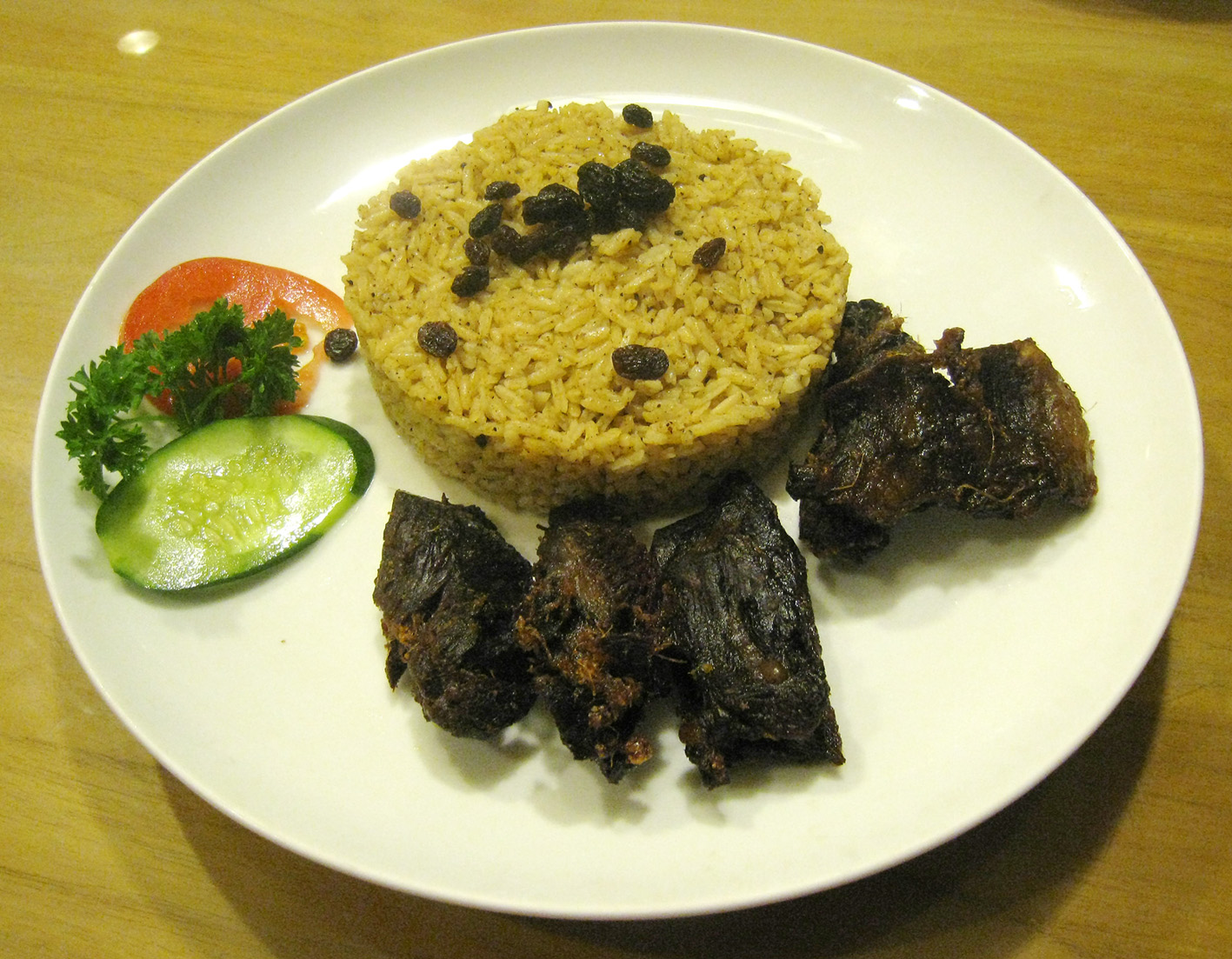
Nasi kebuli

== See also ==
- Cuisine of Indonesia
- List of Indonesian dishes
- Arab Indonesian
- Arab cuisine
