= Poi (dessert) =

Traditional Samoan fruit dessert

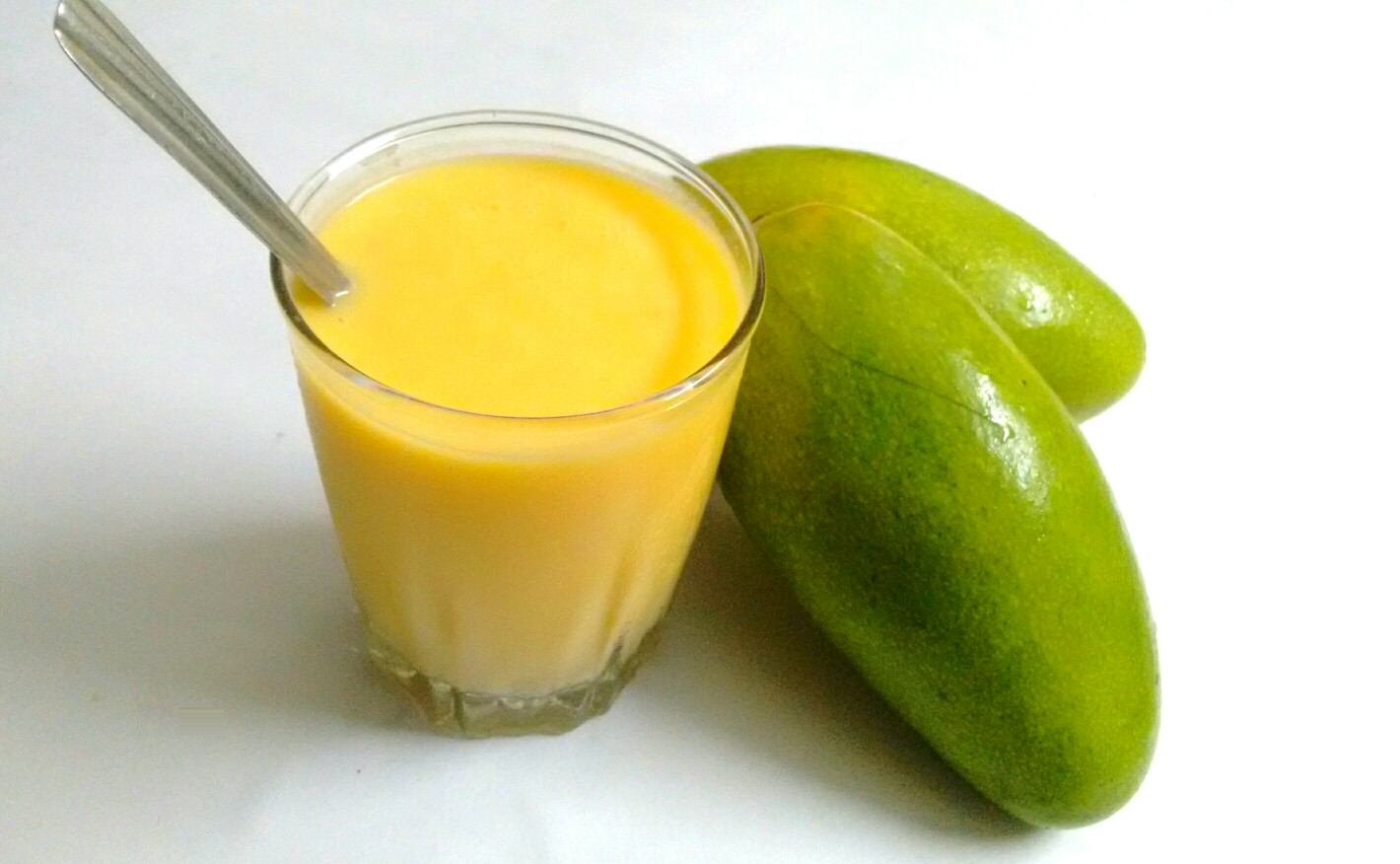
- Type: Pudding
- Course: Dessert
- Place of origin: Samoa
- Main ingredients: Fruit, Coconut milk
- Variations: Banana (Poi faʻi), Mango (Poi mago)

Poi is a traditional Samoan dessert made from mashing fruit into a smooth consistency and mixing in coconut milk and other flavourings.

== Preparation ==
Poi is traditionally prepared from bananas. Ripe bananas are peeled and added to a bowl with the addition of water. The bananas are kneaded along with the water with the hands until it resembled a smooth paste, with coconut cream mixed in. The Poi was served in cups made from coconut shells.

In a modern preparation, bananas are blended together along with cold water or ice, coconut milk and flavourings such as vanilla, lemon, lime or sugar in a mechanical blender into a smooth paste, poured into bowls or glasses and left to chill in a fridge for a few hours. Other fruits can replace bananas for poi in a recipe, such as mango which is known as Poi mago.

While Poi is similar to other Samoan desserts such as sua fa'i and supo esi, it differs from them as it isn’t thickened by starch and is eaten chilled, not hot.

== See also ==
- Po‘e – A similar Polynesian dessert made from bananas, but with a more solid consistency.
- Poi – A mashed paste made from starches such as taro, breadfruit or plantain, eaten in eastern Polynesia.
- List of desserts
