= Haupia =

Polynesian coconut milk pudding

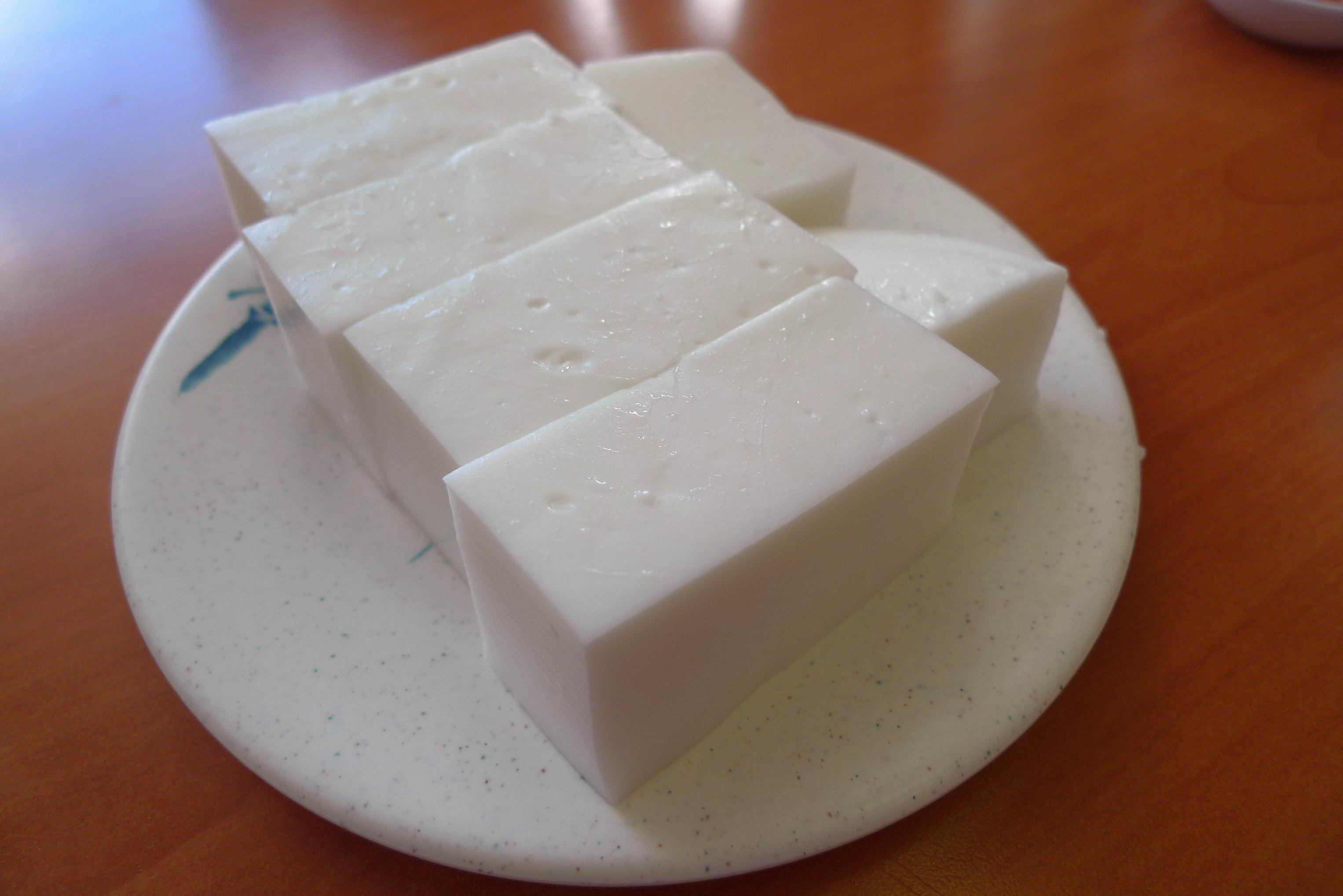
- Alternative names: Rētiʻa, Vatia, Nanē Pia
- Type: Pudding
- Course: Dessert
- Place of origin: Polynesia
- Region or state: American Samoa, French Polynesia, Hawaii, Samoa, Solomon Islands, Tonga, Tuvalu
- Main ingredients: Coconut milk, starch

Haupia is the Hawaiian name for a traditional coconut pudding found throughout Polynesia.

== History ==
Haupia and other similar coconut puddings are a variety of traditional Polynesian pudding. Puddings made in the Pacific islands generally consist of two components; a base made from a starch such as taro or breadfruit and an emollient such as coconut milk or oil that bound the material together when cooked.

Starch extracted from the pia (or Polynesian arrowroot) is the original thickening agent used in making this dish. These puddings would originally have had a more mucilaginous consistency, and more so without refrigeration historically. Cornstarch (grain starch) is often substituted for pia in modern recipes which give a different texture overall more akin to gelatin. A suitable substitute for arrowroot starch would be another root starch like potato starch or tapioca. Traditional haupia is vegan and does not contain gelatin, eggs, or dairy.

These coconut puddings that were made by the Polynesians were noted by early European explorers to have a resemblance in appearance and taste to the European dessert blancmange.

== Preparation ==
A standard recipe calls for coconut cream (or coconut milk), water, sugar, salt, and starch to be mixed, then heated until thickened. The mixture may be chilled or left to set until firm.

== In popular culture ==
Haupia remains a popular dessert on its own. It is often served along traditional Hawaiian dishes and at luaus. But it is also a versatile dish that can be incorporated into other desserts.

Haupia is popularly layered on chocolate pudding pie and sweet potato pie. Haupia can also be used in place of buttercream in fillings for cakes, donuts (including malasadas), incorporated into ice cream, or provide a more local twist in almond tofu. McDonald's restaurants in Hawaii seasonally sell fried haupia pies and taro pies.

== Gallery ==
Variants

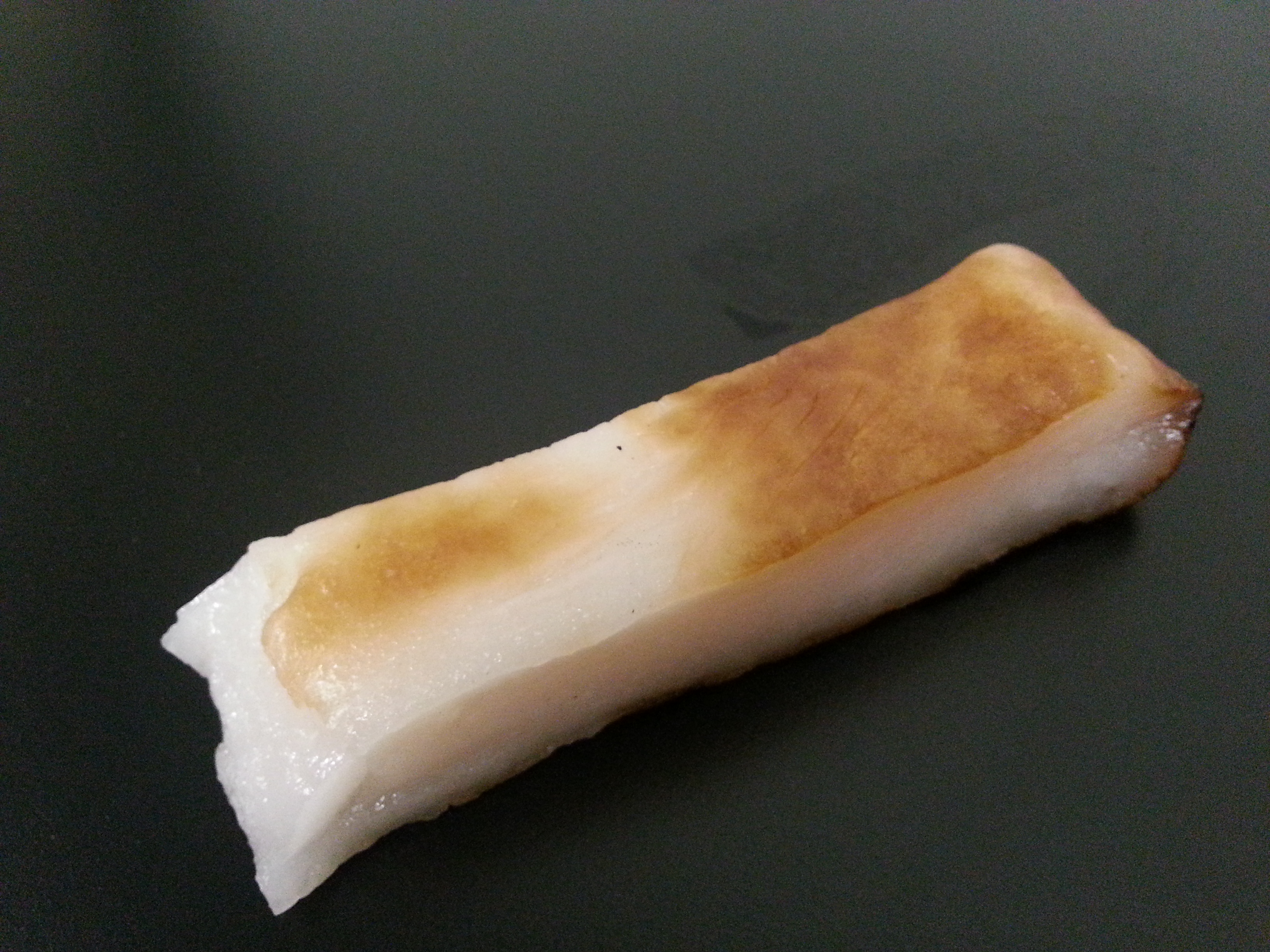
Tahitian Rēti'a

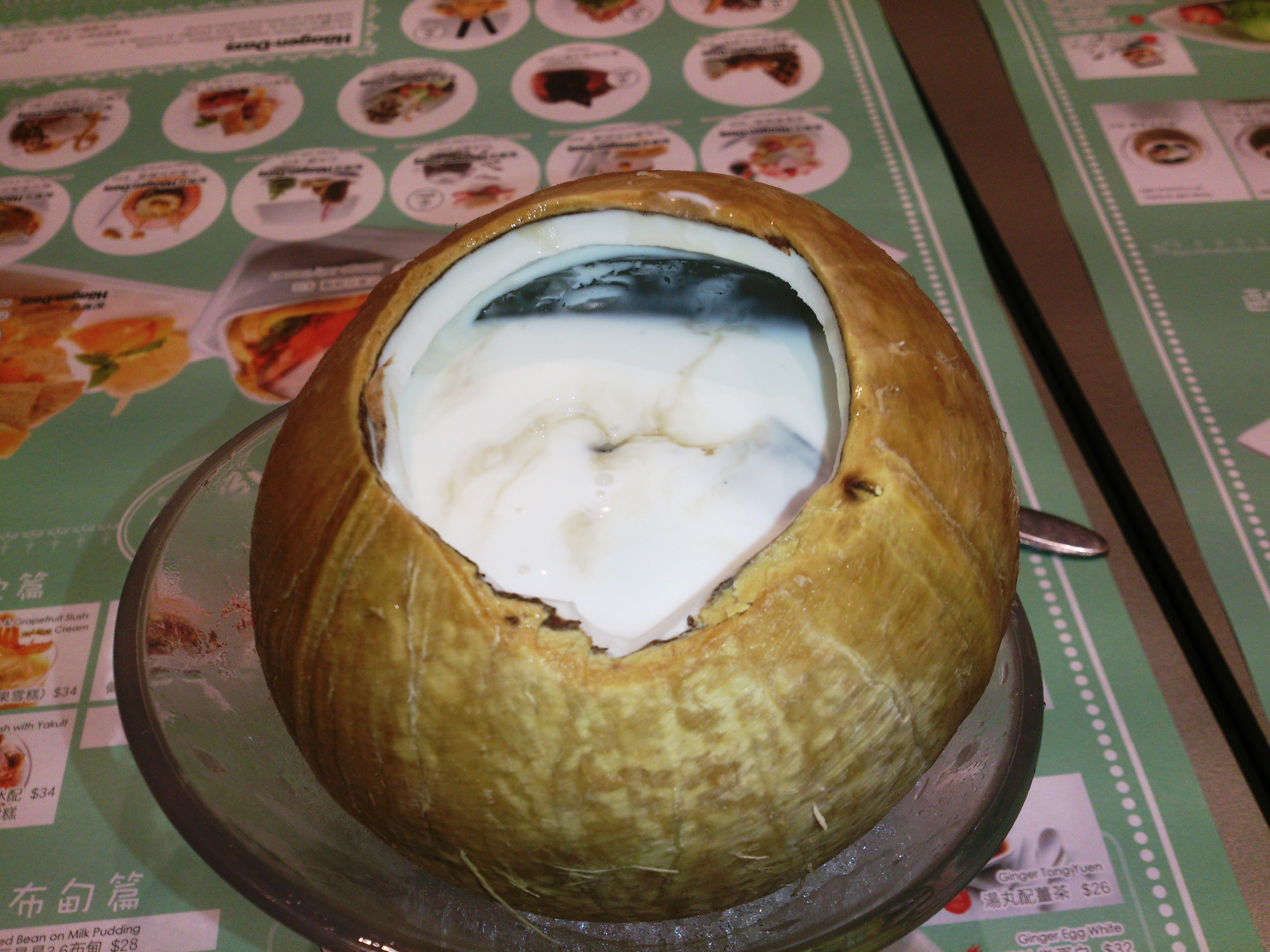
Coconut pudding served in a coconut

== See also ==
- Coconut bar
- Maja blanca
- Kalamai
- Nata de coco
- Tembleque
