= Full breakfast =

Breakfast served in Great Britain and Ireland

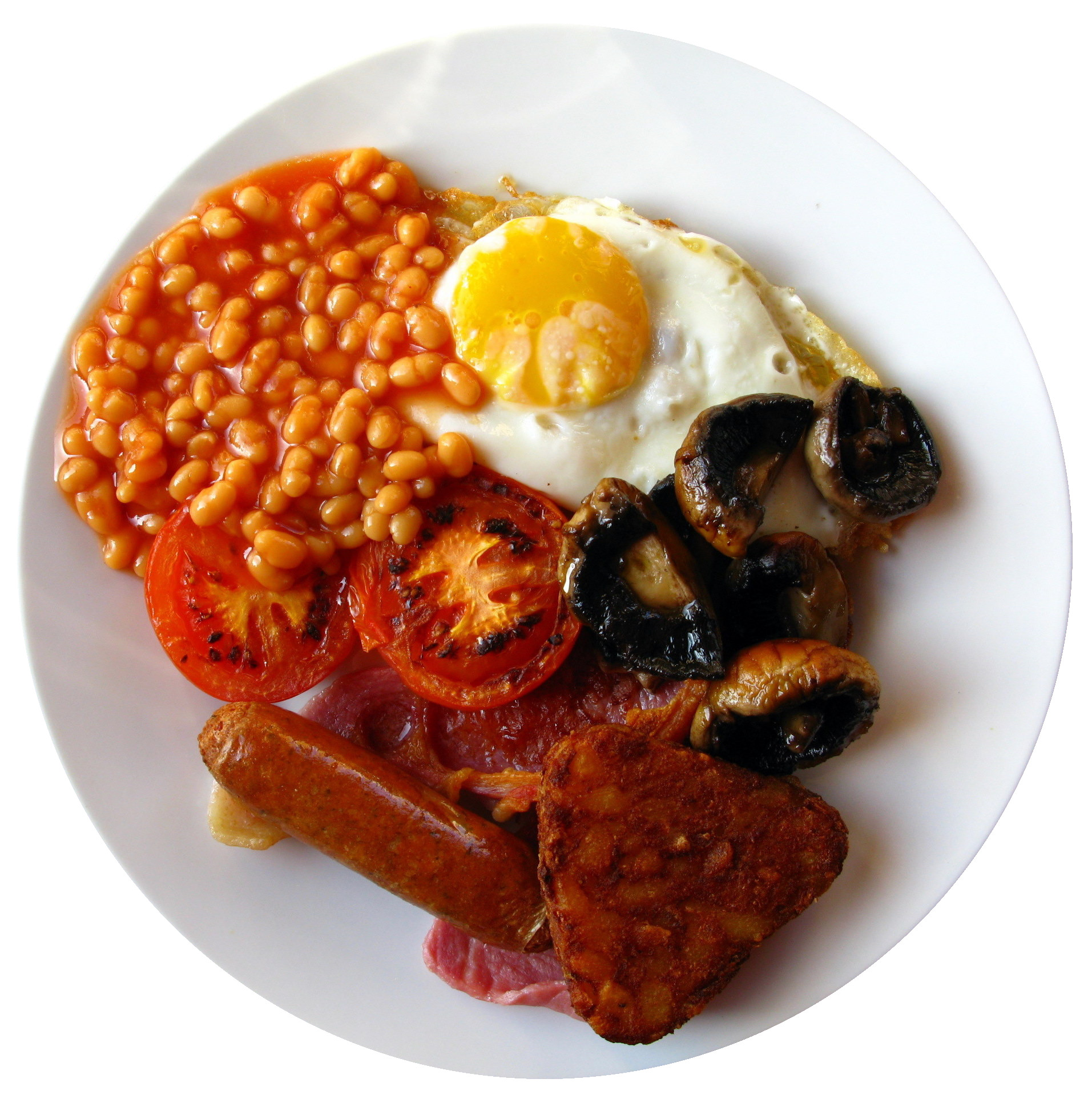
Main plate of a full English breakfast, consisting of bacon, fried egg, sausage, mushrooms, baked beans, with non-traditional hash brown and grilled tomatoes

A full breakfast or fry-up is a substantial cooked breakfast meal often made in Great Britain and Ireland. Depending on the region where it is served a full breakfast, or one of its variants, may also be referred to as a full English, full Scottish, full Welsh, full Irish fry up, or Ulster fry. Other variants of the full breakfast are made elsewhere.

The typical ingredients of a full breakfast are bacon, sausages, eggs, black pudding, tomatoes, mushrooms, and fried bread or toast. The meal is often served with tea. Baked beans, hash browns, and coffee (in place of tea) are common contemporary but non-traditional inclusions.

Fried breakfasts became popular in Great Britain and Ireland during the Victorian era; while the term "full breakfast" does not appear, a breakfast of "fried ham and eggs" is in Isabella Beeton's Book of Household Management (1861).

== History ==
Many of the ingredients of a full breakfast have long histories, but "large cooked breakfasts do not figure in English life and letters until the 19th century during the Victorian era, when they appeared with dramatic suddenness". Across Britain and Ireland, early modern breakfasts were often breads served with jams or marmalades, or else forms of oatmeal, porridge or pottage. Eggs and bacon started to appear in breakfasts in the seventeenth century, but they were not the only meats consumed in breakfasts at that time. The rising popularity of breakfast was closely tied to the rise of tea as a popular morning drink. Of note were the lavish breakfasts of the aristocracy, which would centre on local meats and fish from their country estates.

Cookbooks were important in the fixing of the ingredients of a full breakfast during this time, and the full breakfast appeared in the best-selling Isabella Beeton's Book of Household Management (1861). This new full breakfast was a pared-down version of the country breakfasts of the upper class, affordable to the emergent middle classes and able to be prepared and consumed in a shorter time before a day's work. The full breakfast reached its peak of popularity in Edwardian Britain, and despite a decline following the food shortages of World War II, new technologies of food storage and preparation allowed it to become a staple of the working class in the 1950s. Since then the full breakfast has declined in popularity as a daily meal, due to concerns about health and the longer preparation time needed compared to convenience-food breakfasts. However, the meal remains popular as an occasional, celebratory or traditional breakfast.

It is so popular in Britain and Ireland that many cafés and pubs offer the meal at any time of day as an "all-day breakfast". It is also popular in many Commonwealth nations. It can also often readily be found served in restaurants and cafés in tourist destinations that commonly serve British tourists. The full breakfast is among the most internationally recognised British dishes along with bangers and mash, toad in the hole, shepherd's pie, fish and chips, roast beef, Sunday roast, cream tea and the Christmas dinner.

== Variants ==
=== England ===
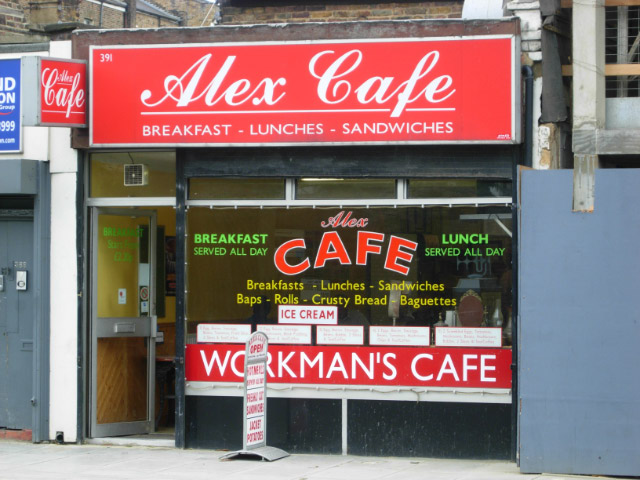
The British cafe (such as this one in Islington, London, with a "breakfast served all day" sign) typically serves the full breakfast throughout the day.

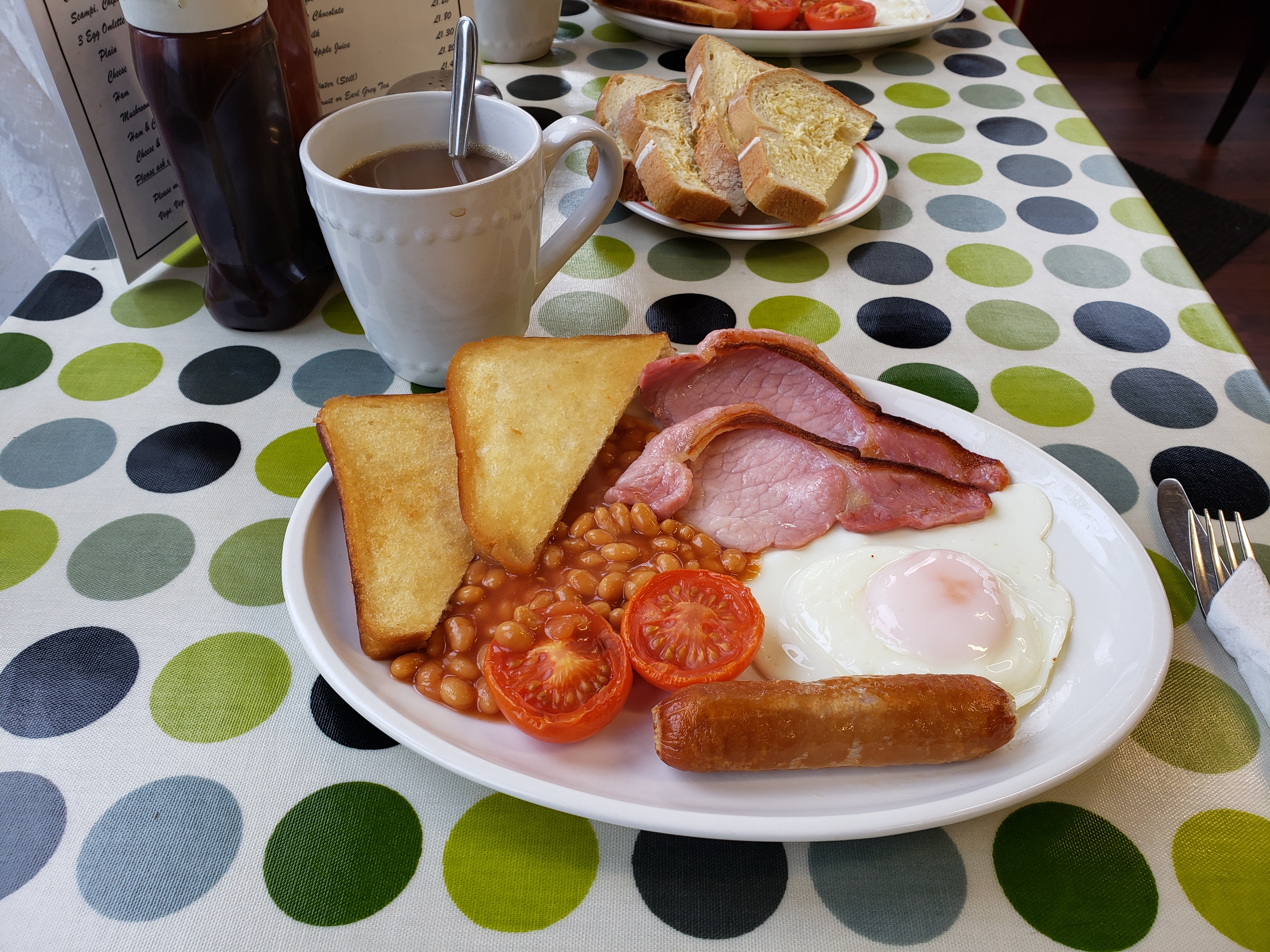
Full English breakfast with fried bread served at a cafe in Brighton

There is no fixed menu or set of ingredients for a full English breakfast. A common traditional English breakfast typically includes back bacon, sausages (usually pork), eggs (fried, poached or scrambled), fried or grilled tomatoes, fried mushrooms, black pudding, baked beans, and toast or fried bread. The other ingredients may be put on top of the toast. Bubble and squeak is a traditional accompaniment but is now more commonly replaced by hash browns.

Black pudding is a type of blood sausage made from pork or occasionally beef blood, with fat or suet, and a cereal. Its high proportion of cereal, along with the use of certain herbs, distinguishes it from other blood sausages. Bubble and squeak is an English dish made from cooked potatoes and cabbage, mixed together and fried. Its name, according to the Oxford English Dictionary (OED), alludes to the sounds made by the ingredients when being fried.

A poll by YouGov in 2017 found the following to be on more than 50% of 'ideal' Full English breakfasts: bacon; sausage; beans; bread (either toast or fried); eggs (fried, scrambled or poached); hash browns; mushrooms (fried or grilled); and tomatoes (fried, grilled or tinned). Black pudding was the least popular of the traditional ingredients, chosen 35% of the time, and 26% of people included either chips or sautéed potatoes.

Buttered toast, and jam or marmalade, are often served at the end of the meal, although toast is generally available throughout the meal.

As nearly everything is fried in this variant of the meal, it is commonly known as a "fry-up". In the UK it is sometimes referred to as a "Full Monty". One theory for the origin of this term is that British Army general Bernard Montgomery, nicknamed 'Monty', was said to have started every day with a "Full English" breakfast while on campaign in North Africa during the Second World War.

Vegetarian or vegan alternatives can be made or are available in cafes and restaurants. Meat alternative sausages and bacon may often be used, with either scrambled tofu or egg substitutes. The role of mushroom and tomatoes is generally larger in these versions.

In 2012, the English Breakfast Society was established as a learned society. Headquartered in Hertfordshire, England, it is "... dedicated to the history, standards, and cultural tradition of the [full] English breakfast." According to its website, it was founded, and has a mission, to research and document that breakfast, and make authoritative reference material about it publicly available. Its activities also include the promotion of 2 December every year as "English Breakfast Day", and the organisation of an annual English Breakfast World Championship "open to anyone, anywhere", with entries to be submitted by email, or via a direct message on social media.

=== Scotland ===
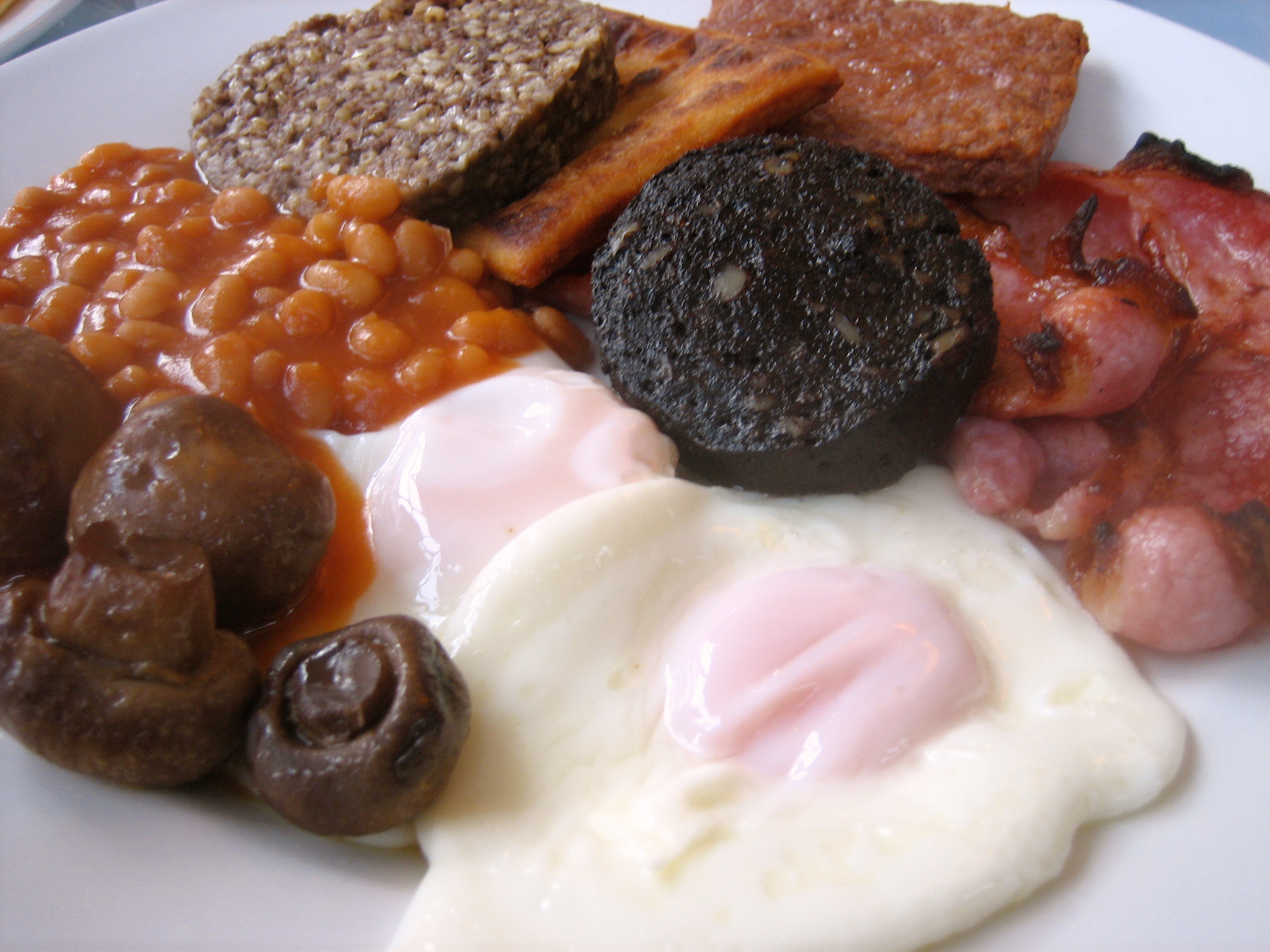
A Scottish breakfast

There are some distinctively local elements of the full Scottish breakfast, including Scottish style or Stornoway black pudding, Lorne sausage, Ayrshire middle bacon and tattie scones. Commonly, a full Scottish breakfast is offered on a menu as an 'all day' dish.

Stornoway black pudding is a variety of black pudding (Scottish Gaelic: marag-dhubh) made in the Western Isles of Scotland. Lorne sausage, also known as square sausage or slice sausage, is a traditional Scottish food item made from minced meat, rusk and spices. Although termed a sausage, no casing is used to hold the meat in shape, hence it is usually served as square slices from a formed block.

A tattie scone (tottie scone) or potato scone is a regional variant of the savoury griddle scone, and is especially popular in Scotland. Tattie scones are typically made with mashed potato and a small quantity of plain flour.

Occasionally a full Scottish breakfast will also include haggis, white pudding, fruit pudding or oatcakes.

Early editions of Brewer's Dictionary of Phrase and Fable referred to a Scotch breakfast as "a substantial breakfast of sundry sorts of good things to eat and drink".

=== Wales ===
Two key ingredients that distinguish the full Welsh breakfast from the other "full" variants are cockles and laverbread.

The common cockle (Cerastoderma edule) is a species of edible saltwater clam, a marine bivalve mollusc in the family Cardiidae, the cockles. It is found in waters off Europe, from Iceland in the north, south into waters off western Africa as far south as Senegal. Laverbread is a purée made from laver, an edible seaweed (littoral alga) consumed mainly in Wales as part of local traditional cuisine. It is often mixed with oatmeal and fried.

Fried laver with cockles and bacon was the traditional breakfast for mine workers in the South Wales Coalfield, but a breakfast in that area may have also included Welsh sausages, mushrooms and eggs. In modern Welsh breakfasts, smoked fish may be included instead of black pudding.

=== Ireland ===
==== Connacht, Leinster and Munster ====
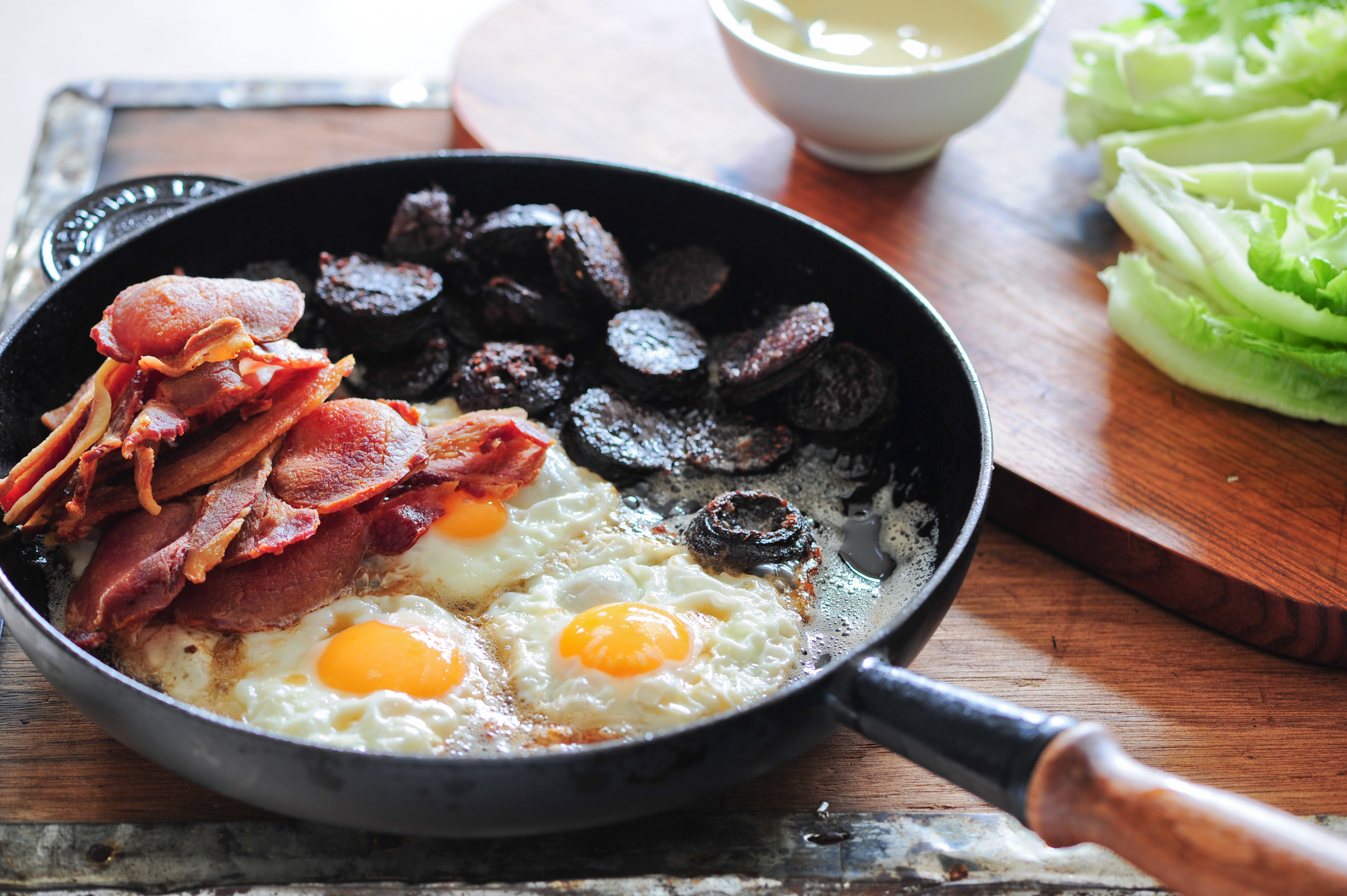
A full Irish breakfast

In most of Ireland, a full breakfast consists of the common ingredients of sausage, bacon and eggs, and sometimes brown soda bread, fried potato farls, white pudding or boxty.

Soda bread is a variety of quick bread in which sodium bicarbonate is used as a leavening agent instead of yeast with buttermilk used to activate the soda.

White pudding is a meat dish originating in Britain and Ireland; it is broadly similar to black pudding, but does not include blood. Modern white pudding recipes consist of suet or fat, oatmeal or barley, breadcrumbs and in some cases pork and pork liver, filled into a natural or cellulose sausage casing.

Boxty (Irish: bacstaí or steaimpí) is a traditional Irish potato pancake.

The "breakfast roll", consisting of elements of the full Irish breakfast served in a demi baguette, has become popular in Ireland due to the fact it can be easily eaten on the way to school or work. The breakfast roll is available from many petrol stations and corner shops throughout Ireland.

==== Ulster ====
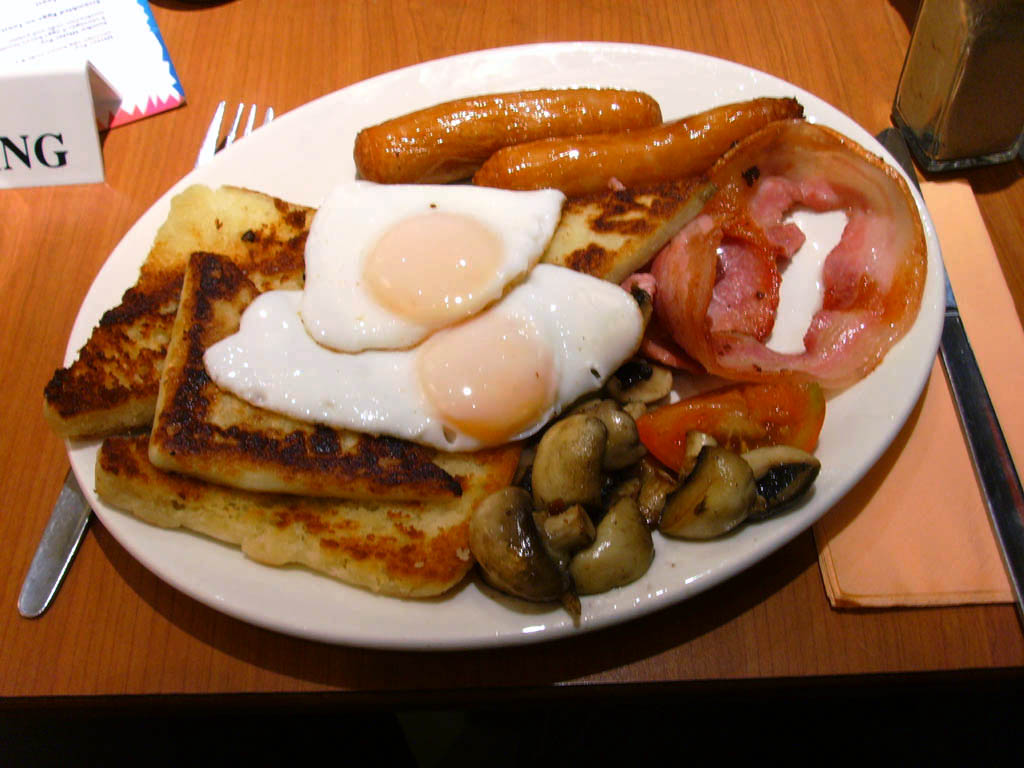
An Ulster fry served in Belfast, Northern Ireland. The potato bread is under the eggs, and the soda bread (soda farl) at the bottom.

In Ulster, the northern province in Ireland, the "Ulster fry" variant is so popular that it topped a poll to determine the province's favourite dish. It is eaten not only at breakfast time but throughout the day.

Traditionally, an Ulster fry includes soda farls and potato bread. An Ulster variant of the Scotch pancake is a frequent addition to those two items, and can be used to soak up egg yolk.

Soda farls are farls made from soda bread. Their integration into the traditional Ulster fry has helped them achieve near-legendary status in Ulster, where they can be purchased in bakeries, shops, and supermarkets everywhere. Potato bread is a dense flat bread made from cooked potatoes, flour, baking powder and buttermilk. In an Ulster fry, it is often served in the form of potato farls.

"Farl" is an old word that means, literally, fourth or quarter. A potato farl is a form of flatbread in which potato flour or potato replaces a portion of the regular wheat flour, although the wheat flour can also be replaced with another flour such as rice or chickpea for a gluten-free version. Traditionally, the dough used to make a potato farl is rolled into a flat circle, cut into quarters, and then baked.

Ulster fry has been described in reliable sources as being from Northern Ireland, but three of the nine Ulster counties, namely Cavan, Donegal and Monaghan, are in the Republic of Ireland. In 2021, Jim Murty, travel journalist, wrote in his blog that he used to eat Ulster fry as a youth in Donegal, and, "when on best behaviour", still did so in Monaghan (and in Belfast, Northern Ireland). In 2024, a business in Inniskeen, Monaghan, defeated four other finalists for the title of Best Ulster Fry in County Monaghan. The winner then went on to compete in the final of the Ulster Fry World Championships, which accepts entries from all nine Ulster counties, plus an additional entry from Belfast.

First held in 2023, the Ulster Fry World Championships are part of the annual Donaghadee Summer Festival in County Down, Northern Ireland.

The organisers of the World Championships specify the ingredients for entries in that competition as being bacon, eggs, sausage, soda bread, and potato bread. "To make things fair, ..." they have stated, no other items, such as avocado, black or white pudding, or French toast, are permitted. As a general rule, according to Ulster fry traditionalists, only ingredients that can be fried in lard (a fat product derived from the fatty tissue of domestic pigs) may be included in the dish. Traditionalists therefore also rule out baked beans, and consider hash browns to be an abomination, even though at least the former are increasingly popular as inclusions.

=== Elsewhere ===
==== Australia ====
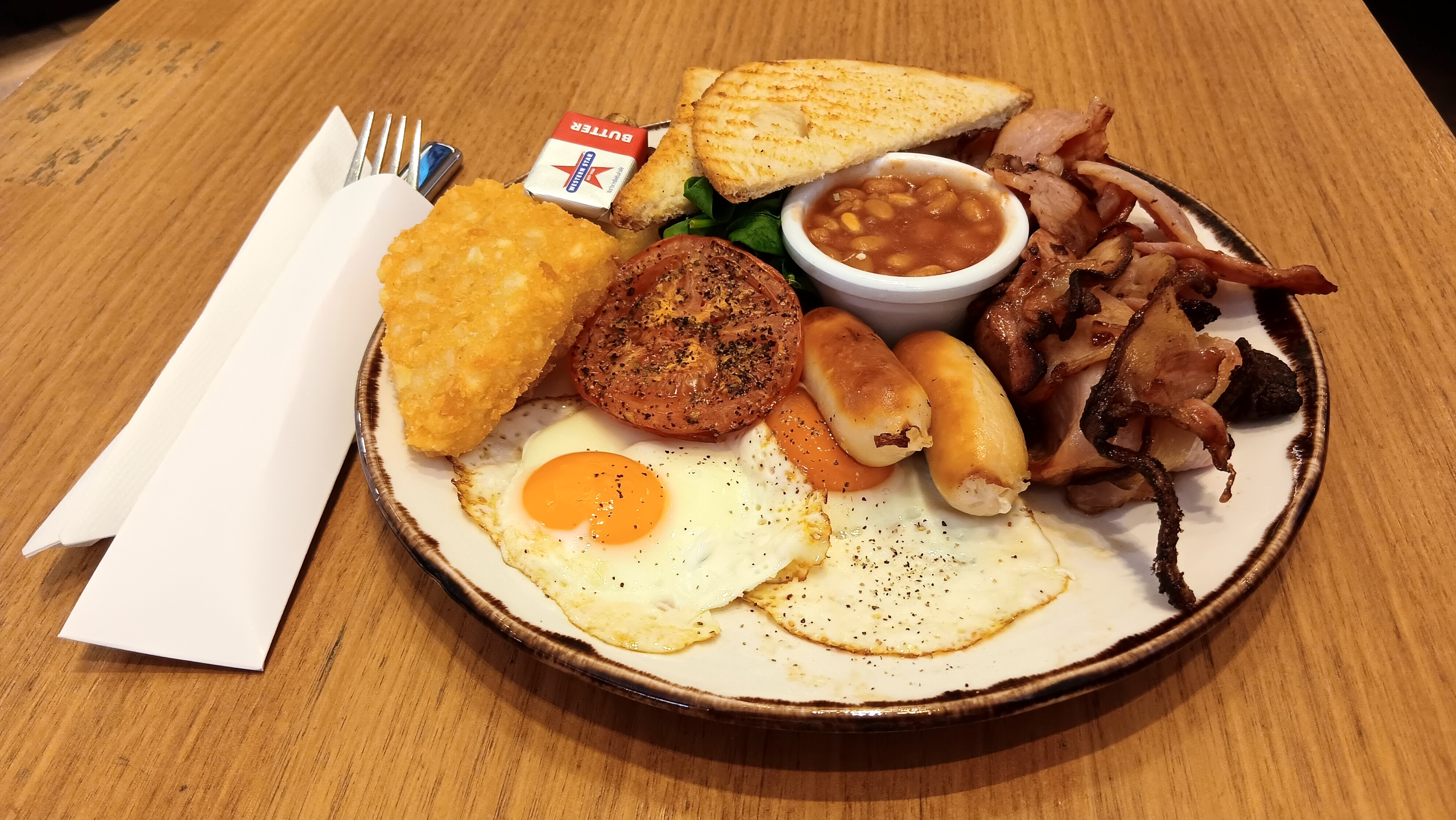
A big breakfast served at Perth Airport, Western Australia

A variant of the full breakfast is also commonly eaten in Australia, where it is referred to, sometimes, as a "full Australian breakfast", "big fry", or "big fry-up", and, more frequently, as a "Big Breakfast", or "big brekkie". The variant has been described as a "quintessential Aussie dish".

Big breakfasts feature on the menus of most Australian cafes, in places ranging from the four biggest State capitals to much smaller locations, such as roadhouses (or truck stops) in regional areas, all around the country.

==== United States ====
The United States shares a similar though modified tradition. There is no commonly agreed on name but there are large heavy breakfasts with similar ingredients, sometimes called the "Lumberjack", "Traditional American", and "Farmers Breakfast". These swap out several key ingredients for heavy savory items and sweet carbohydrates, rather than the strictly savory profile of a UK or Irish breakfast. Typical components are eggs to order, meat such as bacon or sausage, servings of potatoes such as hash browns or home fries (diced potatoes pan fried with onions), and pancakes, a waffle, or French toast, or in the southern USA, biscuits with white sausage gravy.

== See also ==
- List of breakfast topics
