= Kiszczonka =

Traditional soup from Poznań, Poland

- Type: Soup
- Place of origin: Poland
- Region or state: Poznań
- Main ingredients: Water (from cooking black pudding), flour, milk, spices

Kiszczonka (Polish pronunciation: [kiʂˈtʂɔŋka]) is a traditional soup common in Poznań, known also in some other regions of Poland. It consists of water with cooked black pudding, flour, milk and spices.
