= Timoleague Brown Pudding =

Variety of brown pudding

Timoleague Brown Pudding (Irish: Putóg Dhonn Tí Molaige) is a variety of brown pudding which was granted Protected Geographical Indication status under European Union law in 1999. In 2012 the sole producer of the pudding Staunton Foods decided to stop using the PGI designation because they felt it wasn't of huge benefit to their business.

== Production ==
The meat-based raw materials used in the pudding are sourced from the producers who farm within a six-mile (10 km) radius of the factory at Timoleague whereas most of the other ingredients used (cereals, onions, casings) are sourced outside the immediate area.

One of the cardinal features of this pudding is the cereal is soaked in fresh pig's blood the night before preparation of the pudding. The following morning, the remaining ingredients are minced together in a large bowl and blended into the blood mixture before being placed in the casings. Once filled, the puddings are boiled in water for 15 minutes. After boiling, the puddings are taken out and left to cool.

The pudding is brown in colour, is a long cylindrical sausage shape which forms naturally into rings and is made from fresh pigs' blood, pork trimming, cereal, fresh onions, seasonings, spices and natural casings. It comes in weights of between 750 and 1000 grams (1.7–2.2 lb). Due to the inclusion of fresh blood, the taste of the pudding can be described as very clean and rustic. The process of pre-soaking pig's blood in oatmeal is a continuation of the traditional Cork method of combining blood and cereal in a pudding to give it its distinctive regional texture and taste.

== See also ==
- Irish cuisine
- List of Republic of Ireland food and drink products with protected status
