= Clogherhead =

Fishing town in County Louth, Ireland

Clogherhead Ceann Chlochair
- Town
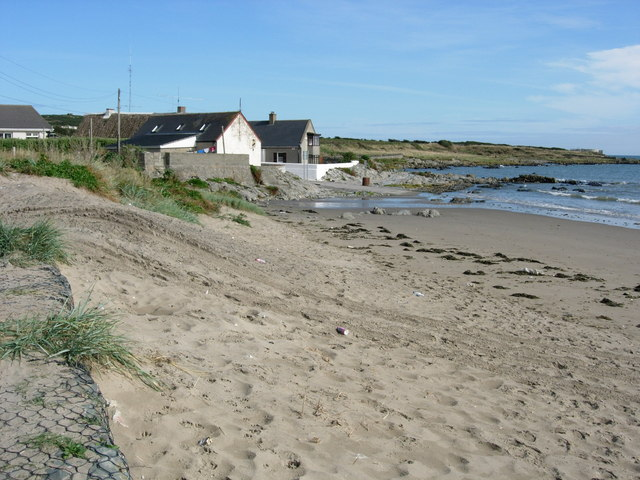
- Beach at Clogherhead

- Location in Ireland
- Coordinates: 53.792°N 6.238°W
- Country: Ireland
- Province: Leinster
- County: County Louth
- Dáil constituency: Louth
- EU Parliament: Midlands–North-West

Population (2016)
  - Total: 2,145
- Irish Grid Reference: O157840

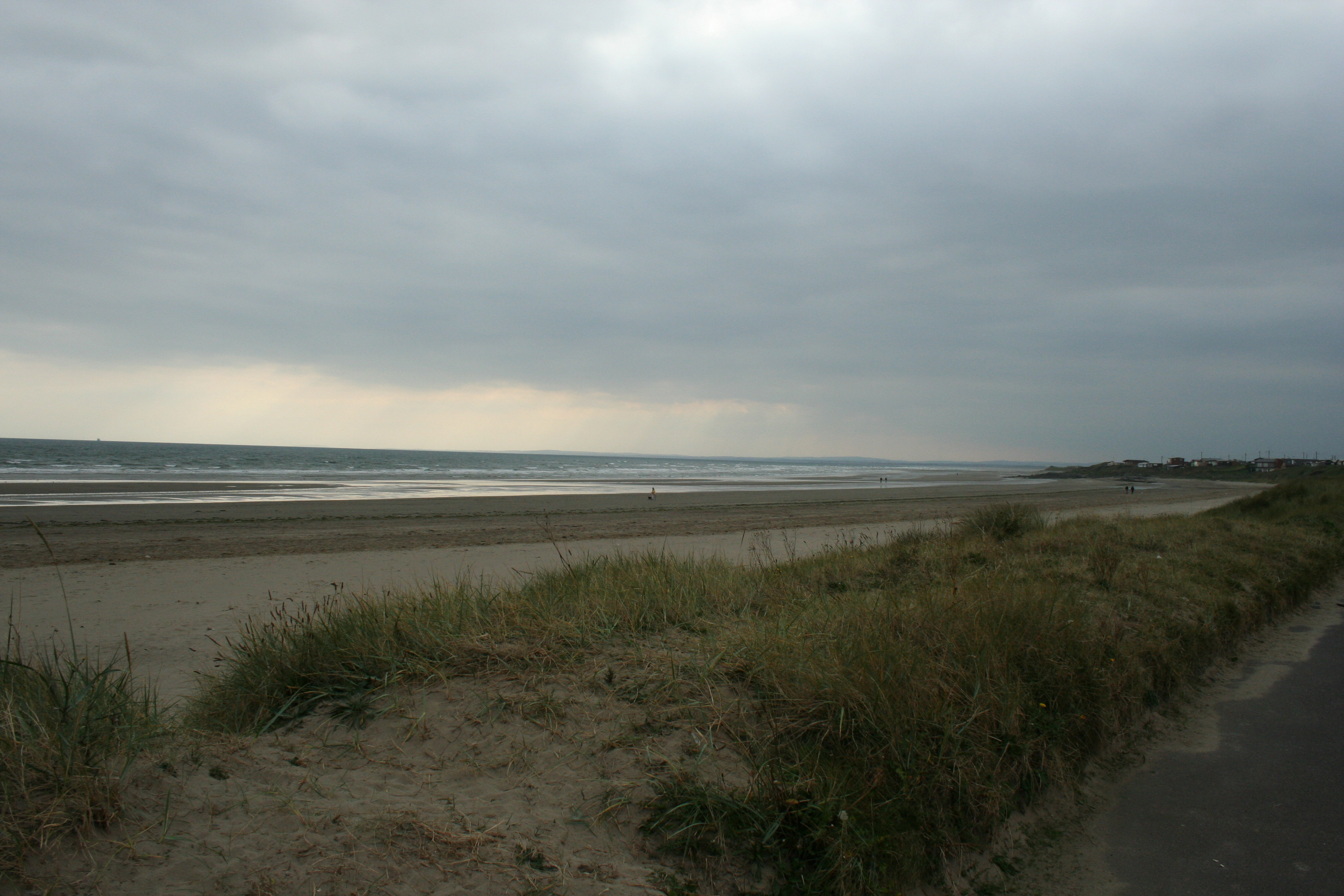
Clogherhead Beach in autumn

Clogherhead (Irish: Ceann Chlochair, meaning 'rocky headland') is a fishing town in County Louth, Ireland. Located in a natural bay on the east coast it is bordered by the villages of Annagassan to the north and Termonfeckin to the south. It has a population of 2,145 according to the 2016 census. It is located in the townlands of Clogher and Callystown, about 12 km (7 mi) northeast of Drogheda. As a seaside town, its main industries are fishing and farming, and there has been an RNLI lifeboat stationed in the town for over 100 years.

== Name ==
Historically, the village was known simply as Clogher (Clochair) or Killclogher (Cill Chlochair) while the headland was called Clogher Head. Today the headland remains Clogher Head, the village is called Clogherhead and the townland they are in is called Clogher.

The headland has a walking trail from the village along steep sea cliffs to the nearby harbour of Port Oriel (Port Oirialla). At low tide, it is also possible to walk the beach as far as the Boyne Estuary. From the headland and at the harbour there are views of Ireland's east coast from the Mourne and Cooley Mountains in the north as far south as Lambay Island and the Rockabill Lighthouse.

The headland is also the site of the Red Mans Cave, where Cromwellian soldiers are reputed to have put to death a number of Catholic Priests during the time of the Cromwellian Wars of 1649.

== Public transport ==
Bus Éireann route 168 serves Clogherhead, linking it to Drogheda via Termonfeckin and Baltray. Drogheda railway station is approximately 13 km distant.

== Economy ==
Clogherhead is a tourist destination, and the village has a sandy Blue Flag beach which extends from near the lifeboat station and on to the Boyne estuary.

Clogherhead hosts the Seafood Rocks festival, a successor to the former Clogherhead Prawn Festival.

Port Oriel is a fishing port with a large fleet, and also the harbour provides a platform for onshore sea fishing for anglers.

Oriel Sea Salt and Oriel Sea Minerals are produced at Clogherhead and have protected designation of origin.

== Amenities ==
The village has two main beaches. Port Beach in the centre of the village is a Blue Flag beach with the Neptune watersports centre which is run by the local council. The centre is the location for Celtic Adventures which provides schools and groups with a range of sports and training services including watersports, archery and climbing. In addition, it is the location for the local RNLI lifeboat station which houses a Mersey class lifeboat, the Doris Bleasdale. The other beach is on the north side of the village and is known as the 'Big Strand'. Both have bathing facilities with a lifeguard on duty at the village beach during summer months.

There are three public houses in the village, as well as a number of restaurants.

== Education ==
Callystown National School (a Catholic school under the trusteeship of the Archbishop of Armagh) has been in "official" existence since 1832. It is located on the north side of the village with access through the estate of John Kirk Park. As of the 21st century, it has approximately 300 pupils and has been extended a number of times to cater for the population growth in the village and an influx of pupils from the surrounding areas.

== Sport ==
As well as fishing and watersports, the local Gaelic Athletic Association club, Dreadnots Gaelic Football Club, have had three senior players in the Louth County team: Pádraig Rath, Anthony Williams, and James Califf. The club reached the Louth senior championship finals in 2012 and 2014 losing to St Patrick's on both occasions.

Links golf courses nearby include Seapoint Golf Club located at Termonfeckin, and County Louth Golf Club (which hosted the Irish Open in 2004 and again in May 2009) located at Baltray. There is also a pitch and putt course. Walshestown clay-pigeon shooting club is near Clogherhead at Murray's Cross.

== In popular culture ==
Clogherhead has been used as a filming location for a number of films, including:

- Perrier's Bounty (Parallel Film Productions, 2008), with Cillian Murphy, Jim Broadbent and Brendan Gleeson
- The Devil's Own (Columbia Pictures, 1997) with Harrison Ford and Brad Pitt
- Captain Lightfoot (Universal Studios, 1955) with Rock Hudson and Barbara Rush

Songs featuring this town include "Is Clogherhead Like it Used to Be".

== Notable people ==
- Albert Cashier (otherwise Jennie Irene Hodgers), was born in Clogherhead and was a soldier in the Union Army during the American Civil War
- Saint Oliver Plunkett reputedly took refuge in a church that once stood in the townland of Killartry in the parish of Clogherhead
- Patrick Anthony Langan-Byrne, WWI flying ace
- Richard Fahey, UK-based racehorse trainer
Port Oriel

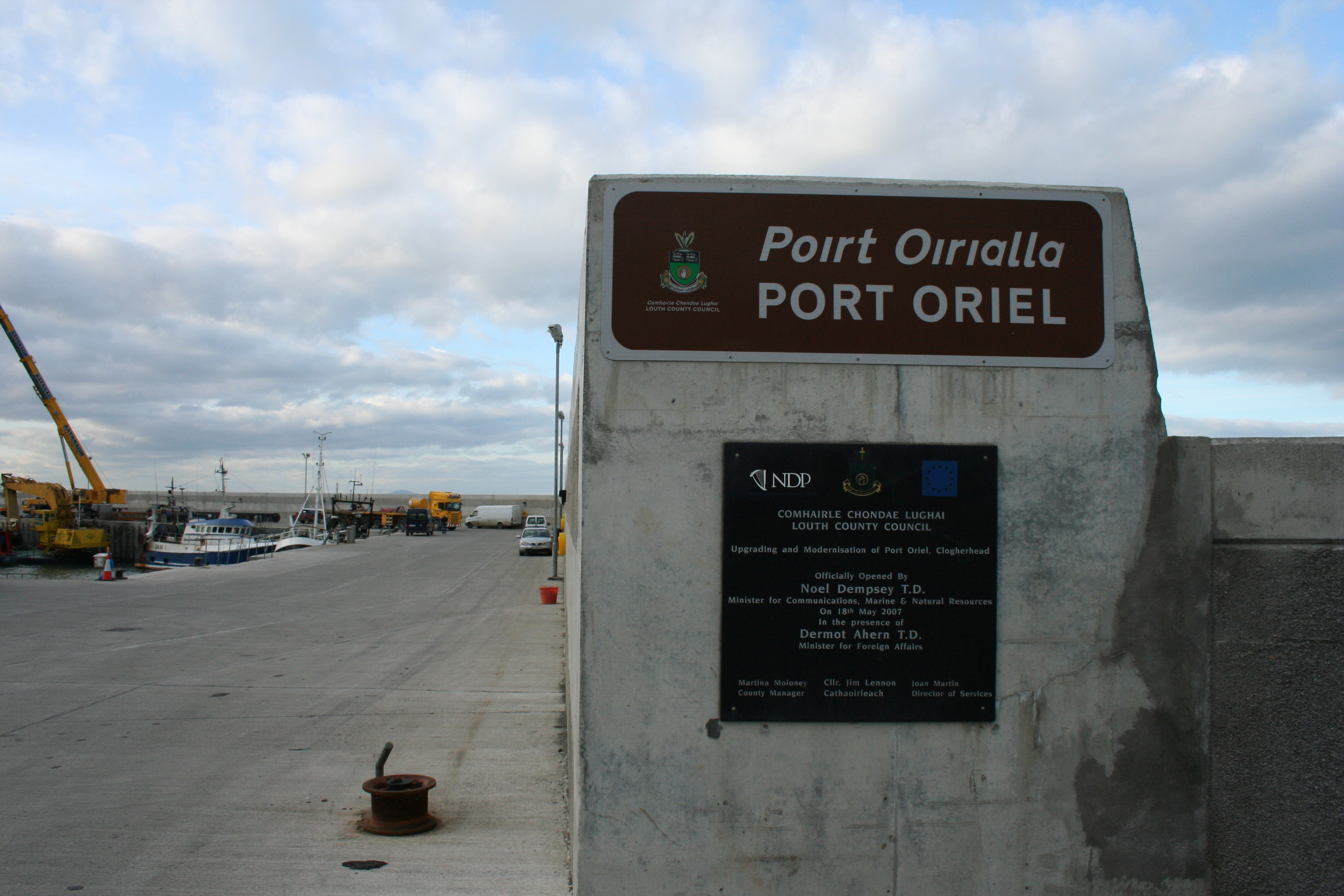
Port sign & plaque

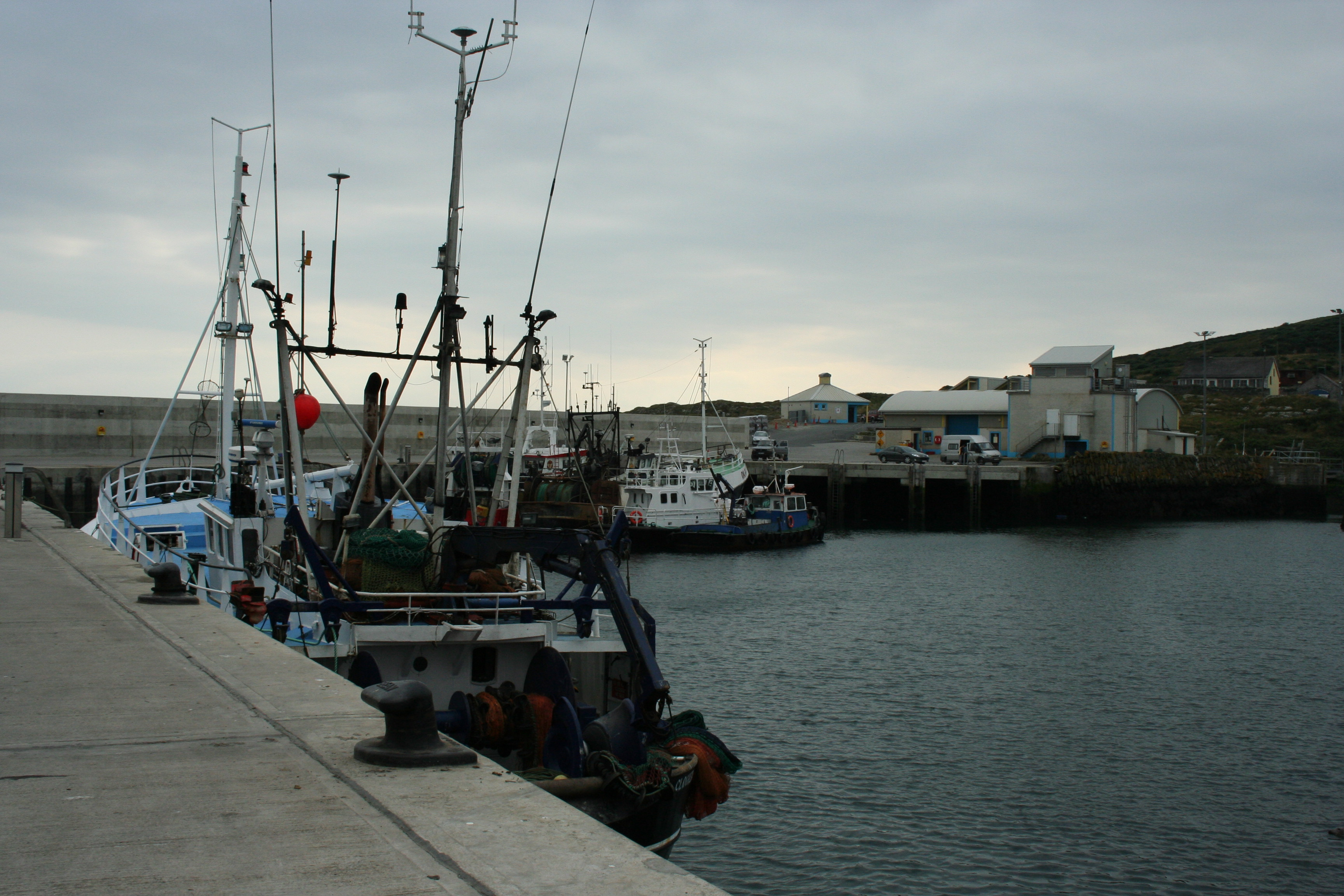
Pier, Port Oriel

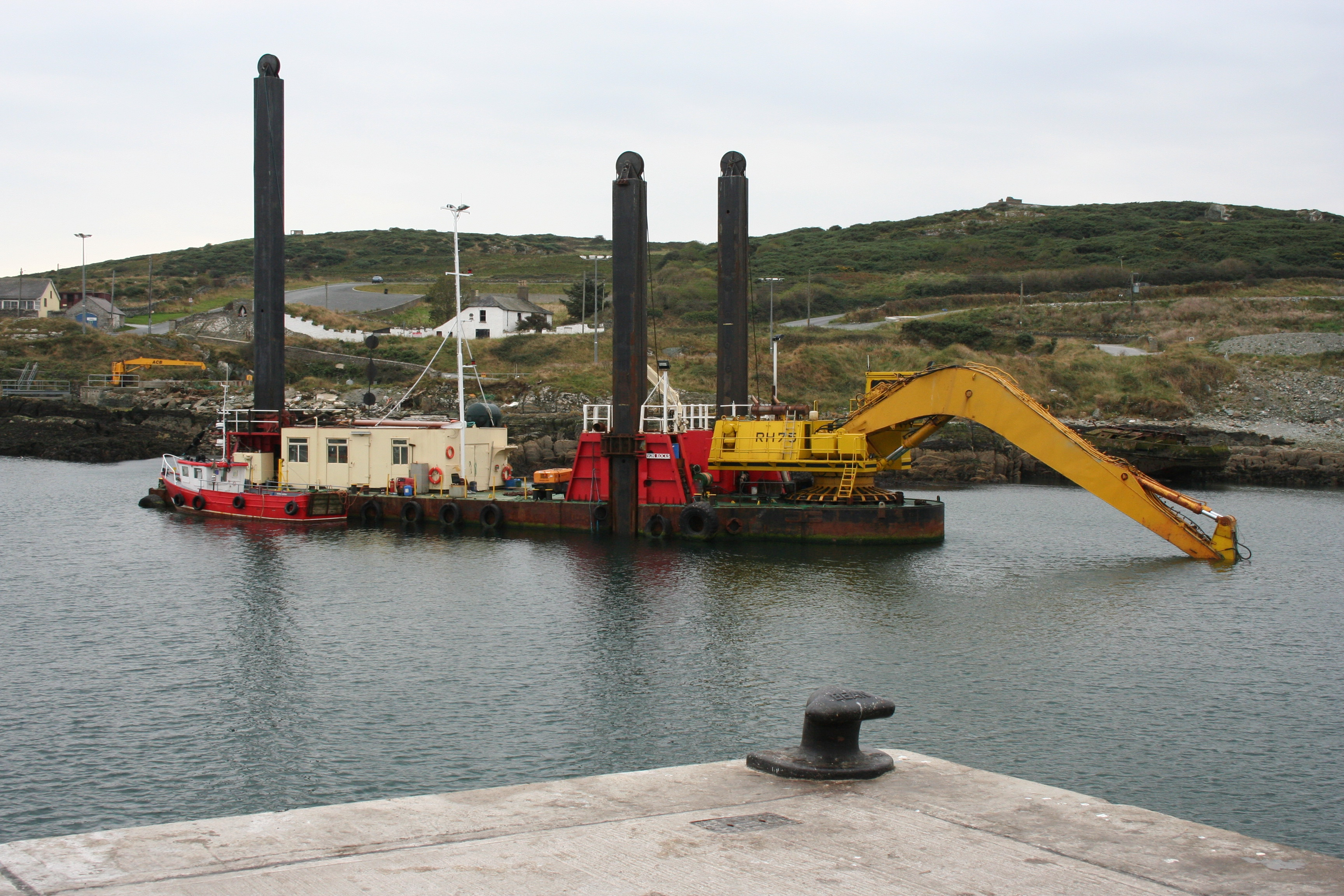
Vessel in the port

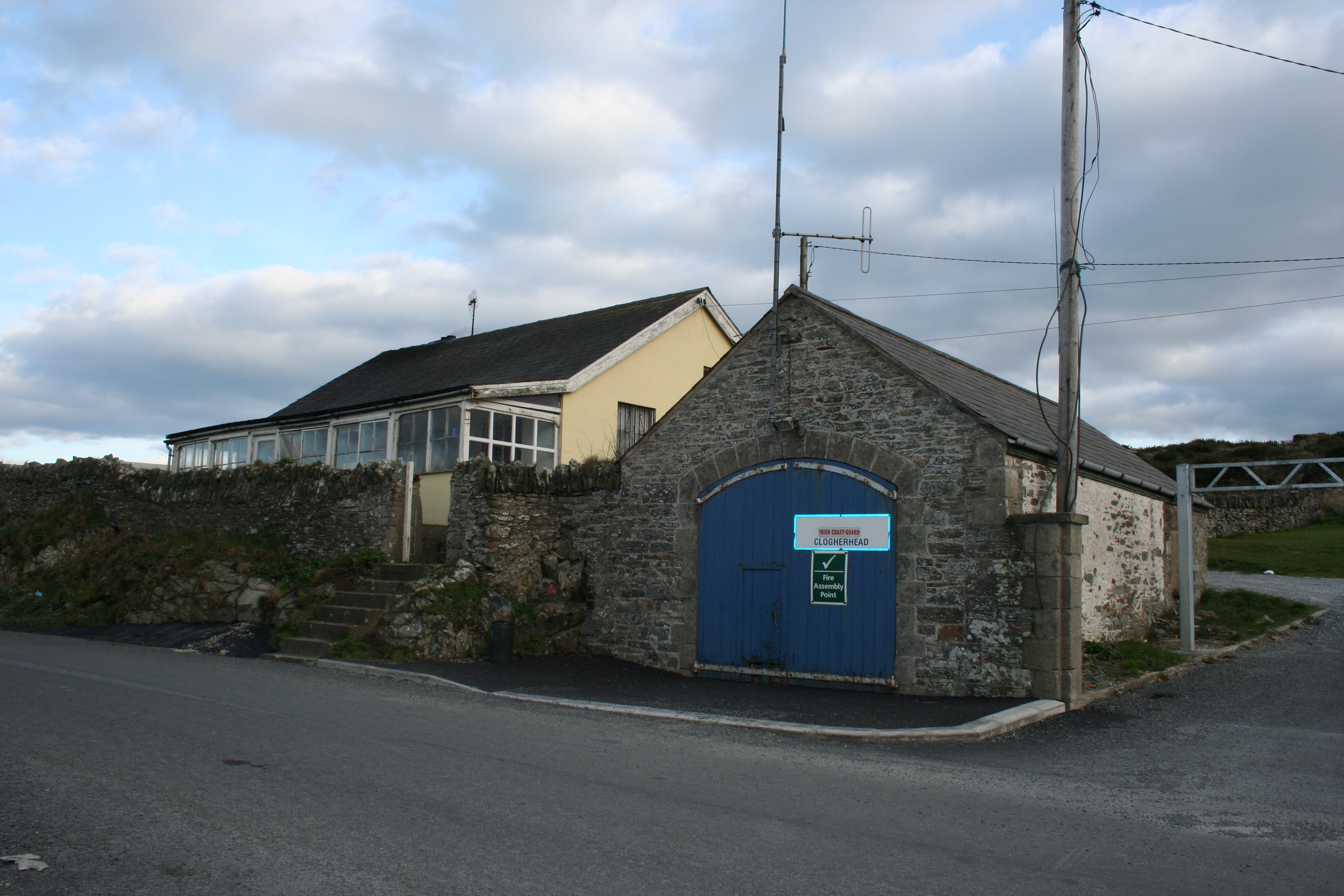
Coast Guard

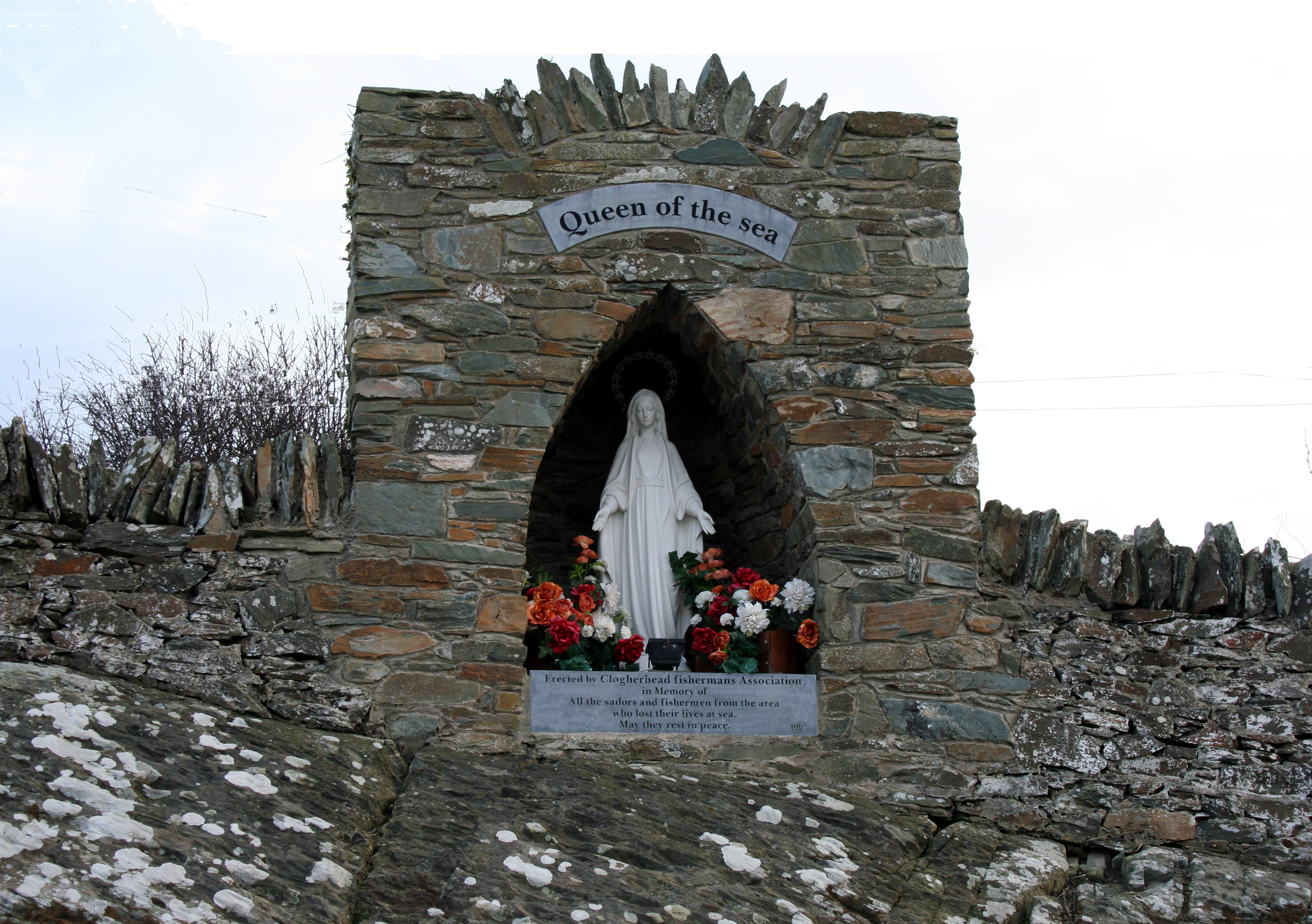
Queen of the sea memorial to those lost at sea
Clogher Head Lifeboat

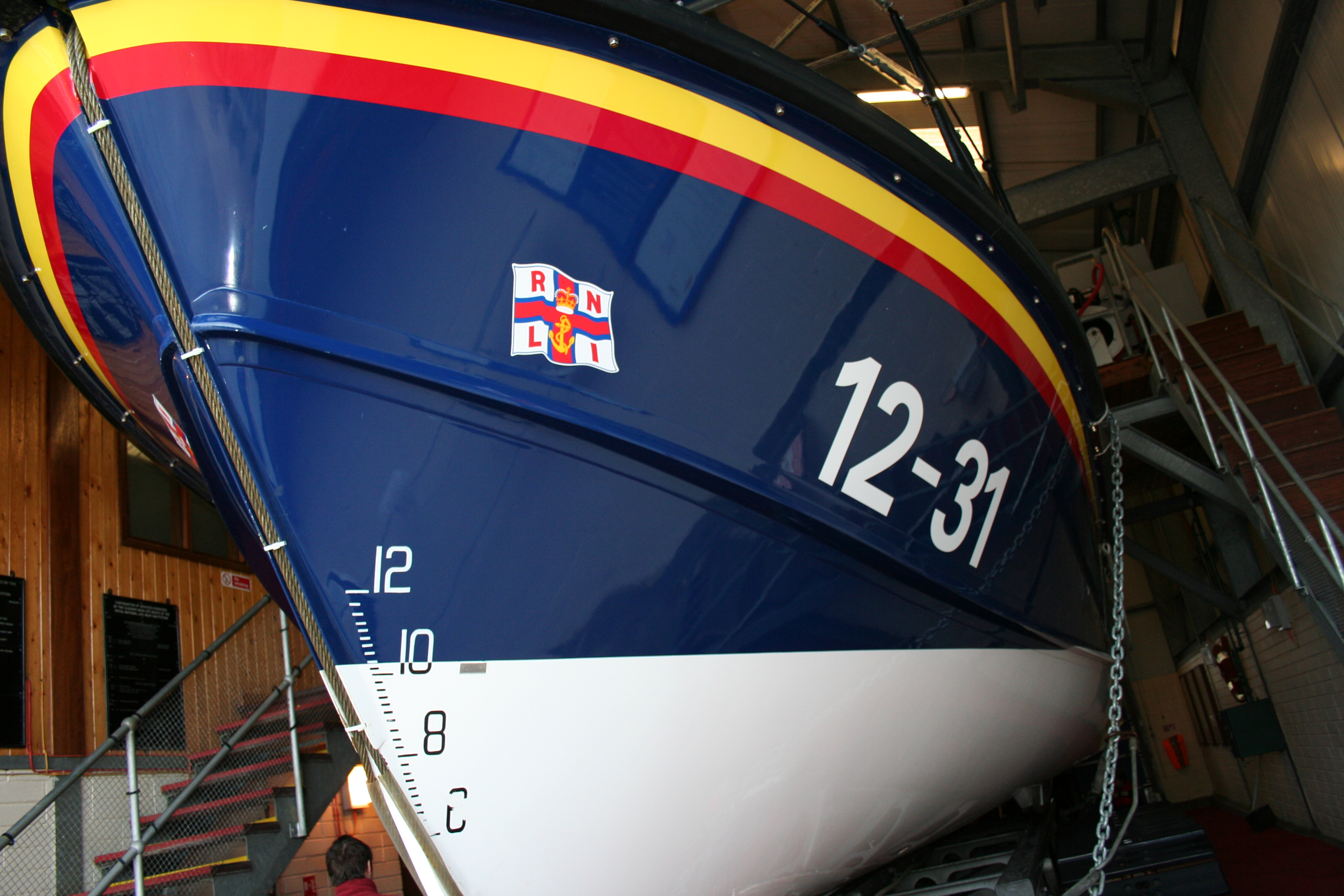
Lifeboat – bow

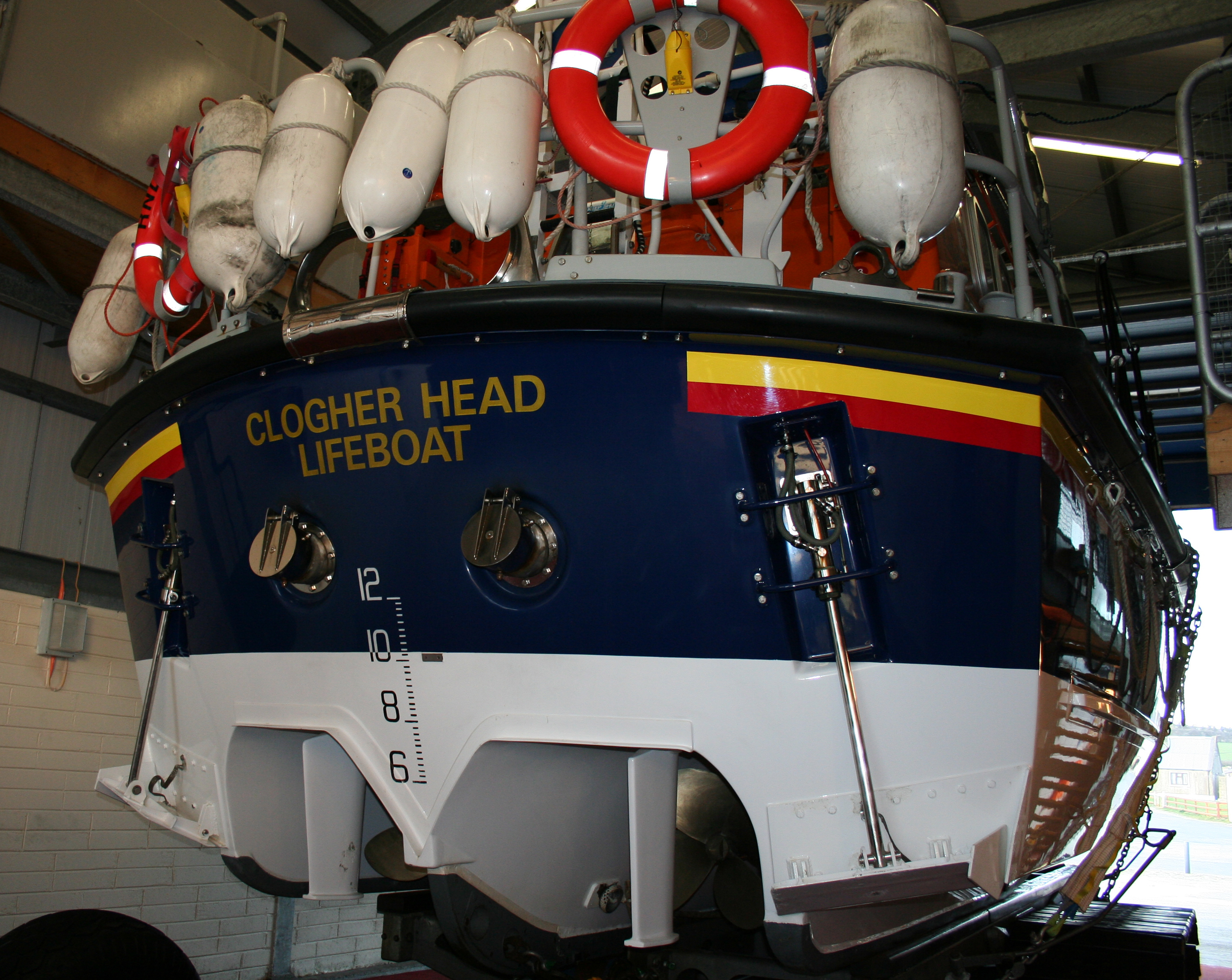
Lifeboat – stern

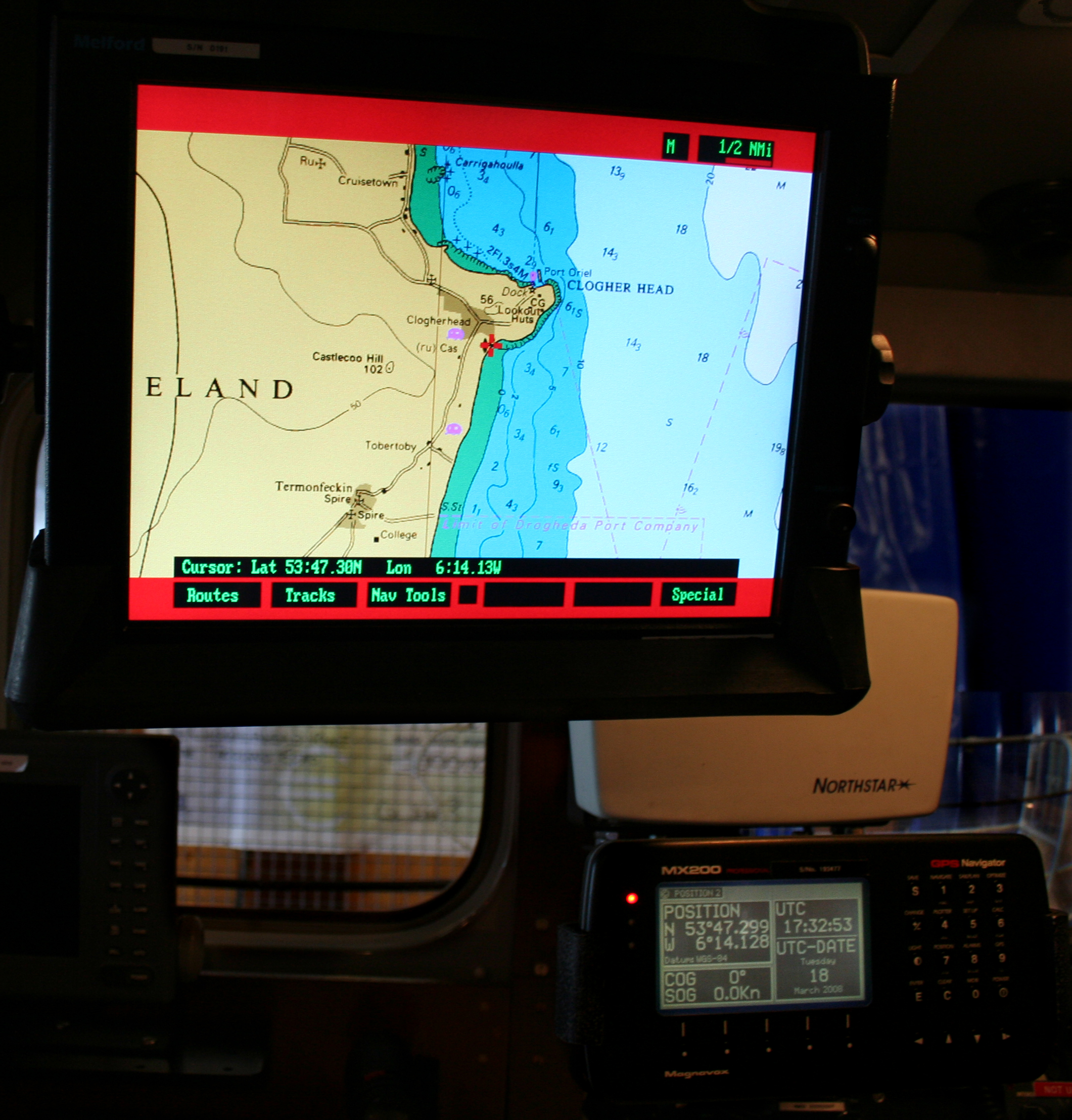
Clogher Head shown on lifeboat positioning system

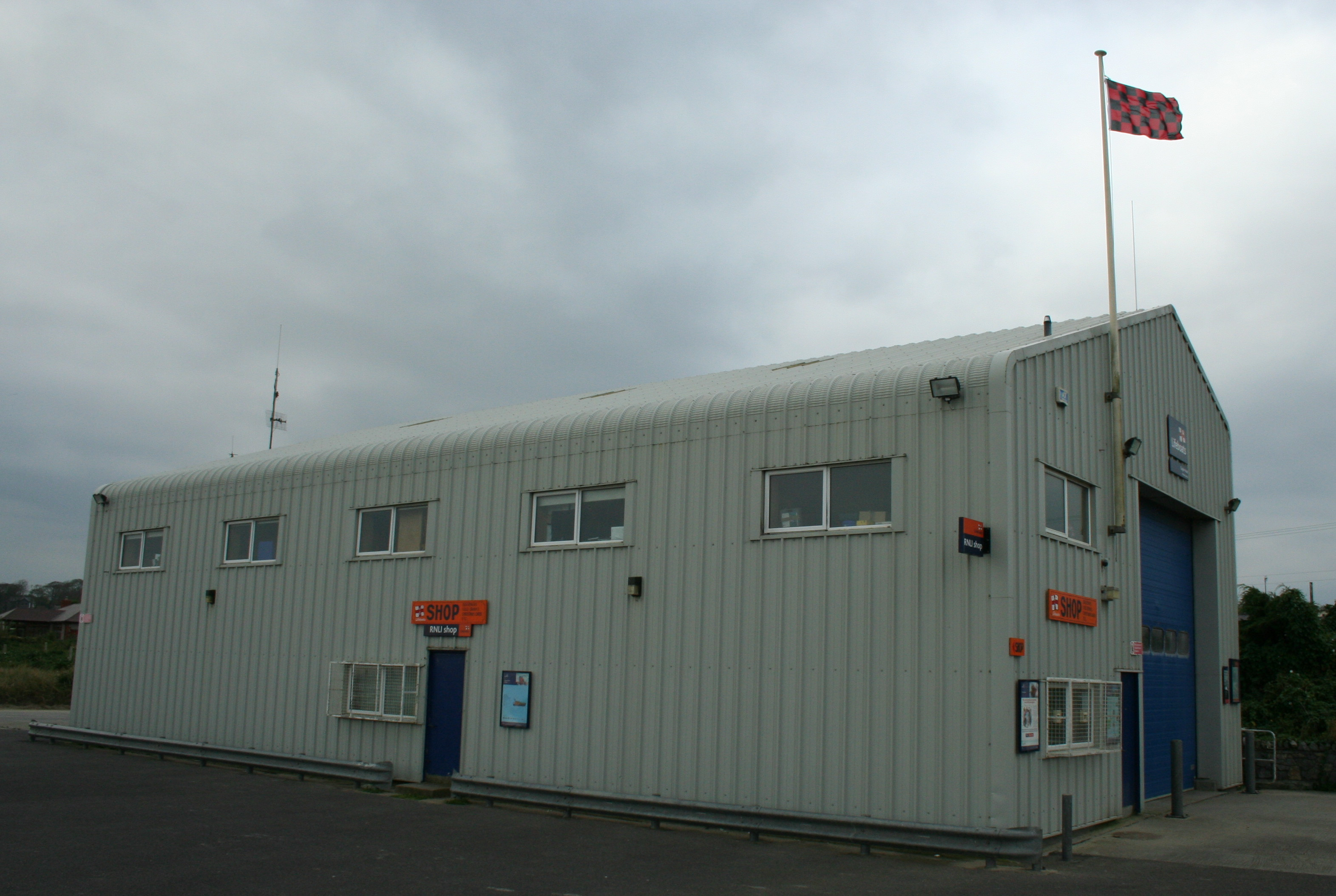
Lifeboat Station

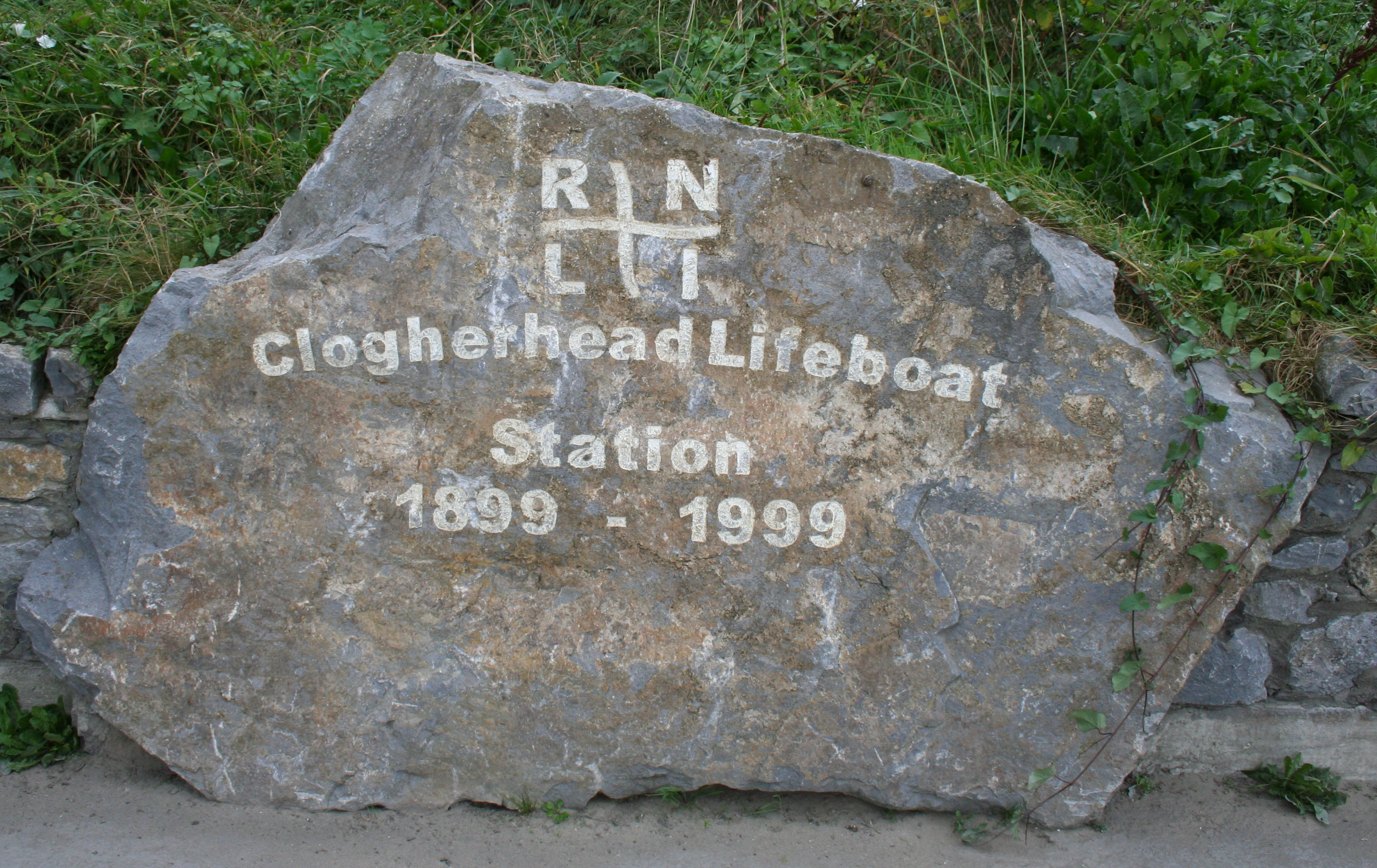
Celebrating 100 years of the Lifeboat Station

== See also ==
- List of towns and villages in Ireland
- List of RNLI stations
- Wind power in the European Union
