= Clare Island Salmon =

Variety of Atlantic salmon found near Clare Island, Mayo, Ireland

Clare Island Salmon (Irish: Bradán Oileáin Chliara) is a variety of Atlantic salmon which was granted Protected Geographical Indication status under European Union law in 1999. Clare Island is in County Mayo in Ireland.

== See also ==
- Irish cuisine
- List of Irish food and drink products with protected status
