= Connemara Hill Lamb =

Variety of lamb

Connemara Hill Lamb (Irish: Uaineoil Chnoic Chonamara) is a variety of lamb which was granted Protected Geographical Indication status under European Union law in 1999. Connemara is a region of County Galway in Ireland.

== See also ==
- Irish cuisine
- List of Republic of Ireland food and drink products with protected status
