= Oriel Sea Minerals =

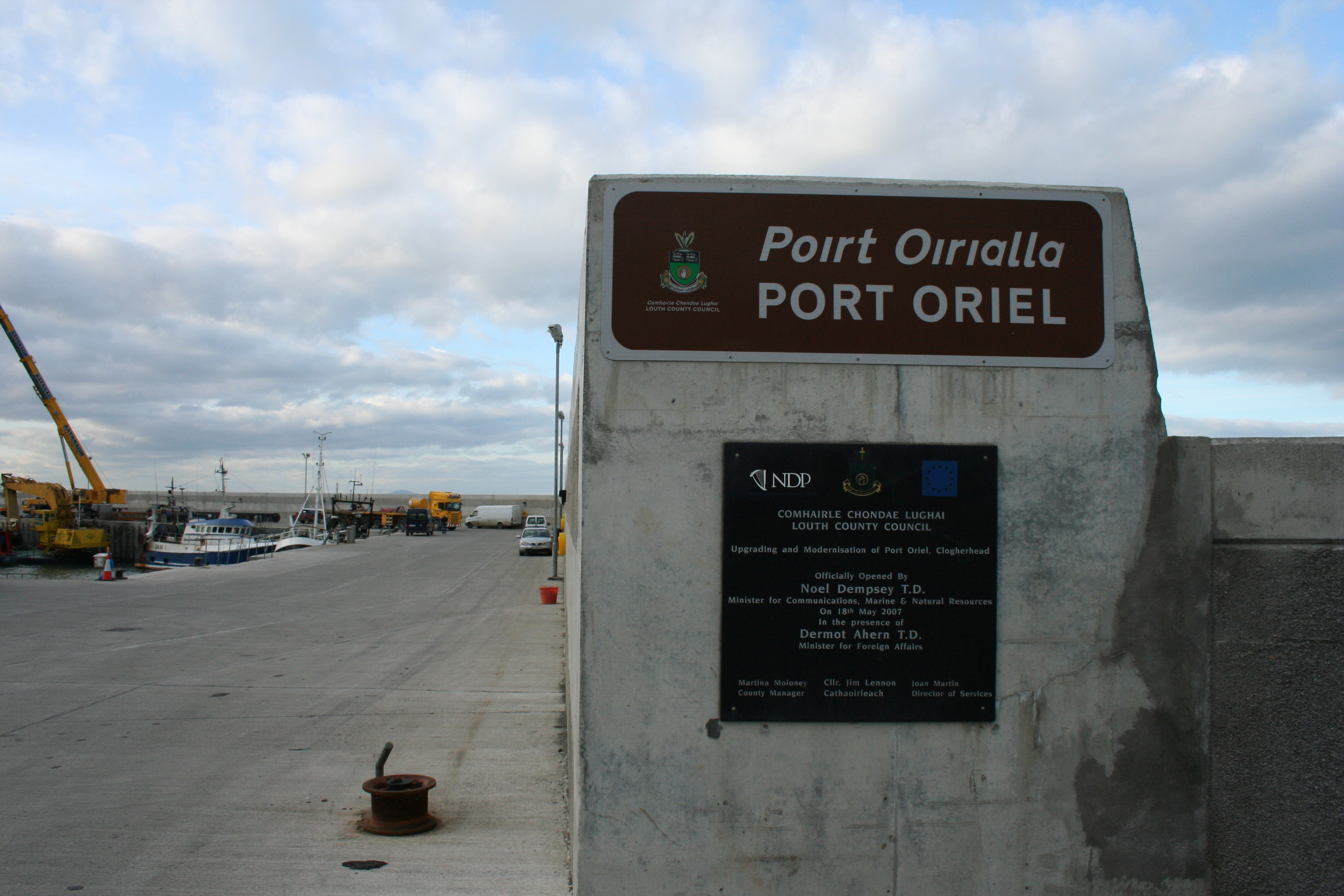
Sign in Port Oriel, near Clogherhead

Oriel Sea Minerals (Irish: Mianraí Mara Oirialla) are a variety of Irish sea minerals.

Oriel Sea Minerals are concentrated sea mineral salts in liquid form and are harvested from the Irish Sea by Oriel Marine Extracts. They are harvested from the bay of Port Oriel near Drogheda.

One of the Oriel Sea Minerals products, Oriel Sea Salt gained protected designation of origin in 2016.

Oriel Sea Salt was established at Port Oriel, Clogherhead in 2010 by Brian Fitzpatrick and John Delany. It extracts and harvests salt and minerals from Irish Sea seawater.

It describes itself as "the only non-oxidised sea salt on the planet": the seawater is pumped from the seabed without being exposed to air, resulting in a naturally white salt with a fine powdery grain and a "smooth depth of flavour."

== See also ==
- Irish cuisine
- List of Republic of Ireland food and drink products with protected status
