= Imokilly Regato =

Brand of Irish cheese

Imokilly Regato (Irish: Reigeató Uí Mhic Coille) is a cows' milk hard cheese made in Mogeely, County Cork, Ireland.

== History ==
The cheese takes its name from Imokilly, an ancient barony of County Cork, covering the coastal region from Youghal to Cobh. It is made from pasteurised cow's milk by the Imokilly Cheese Company, part of the Dairygold cooperative, at its Mogeely specialty cheese facility.

The cheese originated when Imokilly Dairy Co-operative merged with Mitchelstown Dairy Co-operative, and they decided to make a “multi-functional cheese” that combined the best of traditional Cork cheesemaking with modern dairy technology. Using historical cheesemaking research, the team revived some old Irish coagulating methods and developed their own rennet, and began to produce Imokilly Regato in 1980.

The cheese was granted Protected Designation of Origin (PDO) status under European Union law in 1999.

== Description ==
Dairygold describes their Imokilly Regato as having "piquant Italian flavour, dry firm texture and a light golden-creamy colour. It is characterised by delicate aromas of pears, fudge and butter and has a delicious nutty and creamy taste with a piquant finish." The milk has high levels of β-carotene.

== See also ==
- Irish cuisine
- List of Irish cheeses
- List of Republic of Ireland food and drink products with protected status
