= Sneem Black Pudding =

Traditional-style food from County Kerry, Ireland

- Type: Black pudding
- Place of origin: Ireland

Sneem Black Pudding (Irish: Putóg Dhubh na Snadhma) is a variety of black pudding produced in Sneem, County Kerry, Ireland.

Produced by local butchers Peter O'Sullivan and Kieran Burns, it is described as "traditional blood pudding, uncased and tray-baked. It has a deep red-brown colour and is free from artificial colours, flavours, bulking agents and preservatives." It is sold in squares rather than rings, and the ingredients are beef suet, onions, oat flakes, spices and blood (from pigs, cattle and lambs of South Kerry).

It is claimed that home blood pudding production in the region dates back to the early 19th century, traditionally produced by women; the current recipe dates to the 1950s. In 2019, Sneem Black Pudding received Protected Geographical Indication (PGI) status.

== See also ==
- Irish cuisine
- List of Republic of Ireland food and drink products with protected status
