= Imokilly =

Barony in Cork, Ireland

Imokilly (Irish: Uí Mhic Coille) is one of the baronies of Ireland, an historical geographical unit of land. Its chief town is Youghal. It is one of 24 baronies in the county of Cork. Other neighbouring baronies include Barrymore to the west (whose chief town is Midleton) and Kinnatalloon to the north (whose chief town is Conna).

The barony includes most of the peninsula or land ranging from Mount Uniacke in the valley of the River Bride (in the north), to the estuary of the Munster Blackwater (in the east), to Ballycotton Bay (in the south) to Cork Harbour in the west. The main settlements are Youghal, Killeagh, Castlemartyr, Ballycotton, Shanagarry, Mogeely and Cloyne.

== History ==
Both Imokilly and the adjacent barony of Barrymore formed the early medieval kingdom of the Uí Liatháin which was awarded to the Cambro-Norman De Barry family by King John of England in 1206. Its name derives from the Gaelic name of the most powerful septs in the ancient kingdom - the Uí Meic Caille and the Uí Thassaig.

In 1420, James FitzGerald, 6th Earl of Desmond was made Seneschal of the barony. The Earls of Desmond continued to appoint their FitzGerald cousins to the office. As a result of their participation on the losing side of the Desmond Rebellions, their lands and offices were forfeit to the Crown.

Subsequently, Baron Ponsonby of Imokilly was a title in the Peerage of the United Kingdom.

== Civil parishes ==
There are 26 civil parishes in the barony.

Civil parish Irish name	Civil parish English name
Ardach	Ardagh
Áth Fhada	Aghada
Baile an Teampaill	Ballintemple
An Baile Uachtarach	Ballyoughtera
Bothlán	Bohillane
Cill Chríodáin	Kilcredan
Cill Ia	Killeagh
Cill Mhaithín	Kilmahon
Cill Modhomhnóg	Kilmacdonogh
Cluain Molt	Clonmult
Cluain Pruachais	Clonpriest
Cluain	Cloyne
Corcaigh Bheag	Corkbeg
Daingean Donnabháin	Dangandonovan
Dún Guairne	Dungourney
Eochaill	Youghal
Garraí Bhoithe	Garryvoe
Garrán an Chiniféicigh	Garranekinnefeake
An Inse	Inch
Íochtar Morú	Ightermurragh
Maigh Aisí	Mogeesha
Maigh Dhíle	Mogeely
Mainistir na Corann	Midleton
Ros Tialláin	Rostellan
Tigh an tSeiscinn	Titeskin
Trá Bholgan	Trabolgan

== Imokilly today ==
Economic activity in the barony is dominated by agriculture. The cheese Imokilly Regato (PDO) has been granted Protected Geographical Status under European Union law. Trabolgan Holiday Village is located in the civil parish of Trabolgan.

Imokilly GAA is the region's Gaelic football and Hurling division. Imokilly won the Cork SHC in 2017, beating Blackrock by 3-13 to 0-18.

== See also ==
- List of civil parishes of County Cork
- List of townlands of the barony of Imokilly
