= Möpkenbrot =

German pork and grain sausage

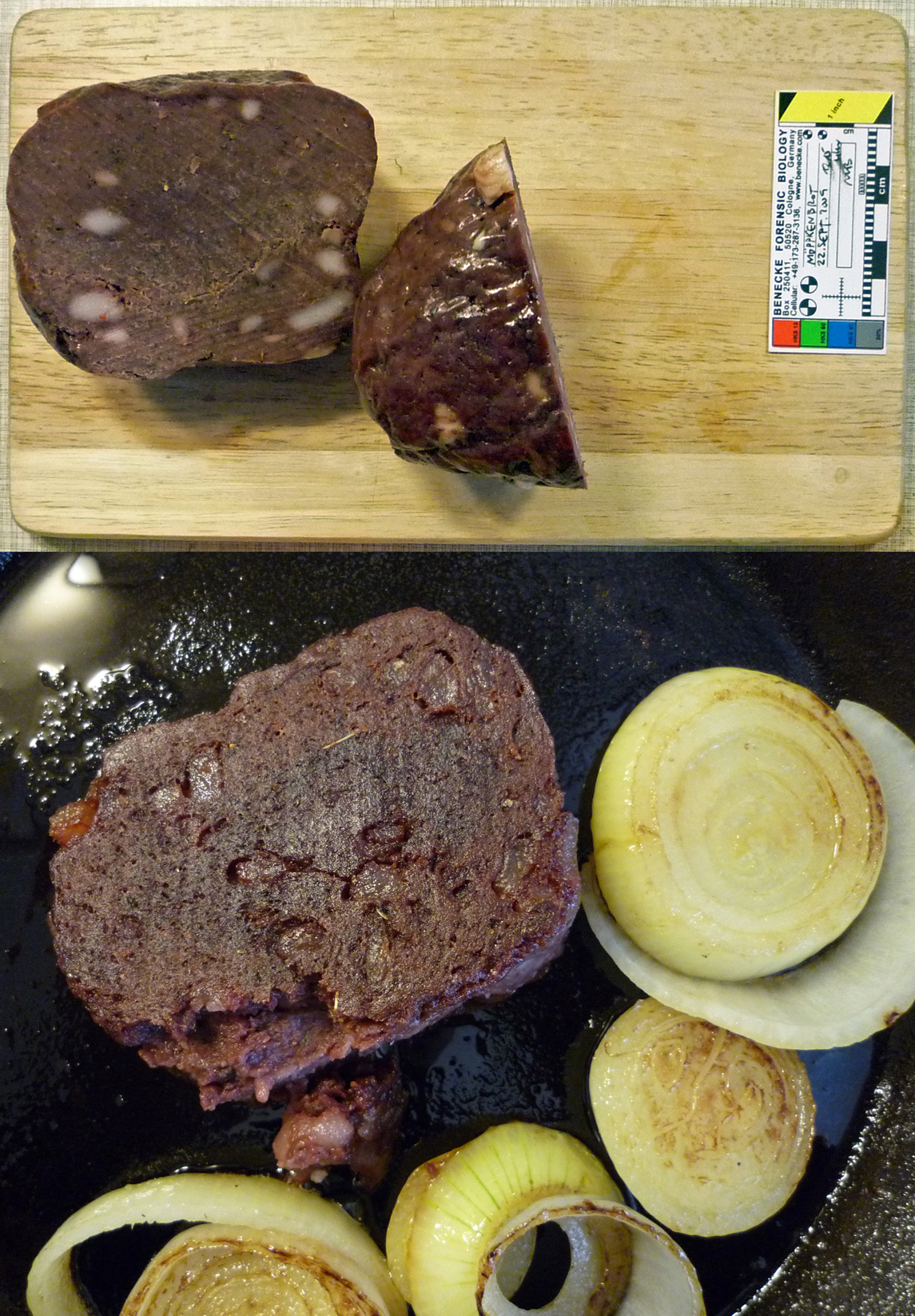
Möpkenbrot from Bochum, Germany. The top image is the raw lump product freshly sliced open. The bottom image shows it prepared as a typical dish in a frying pan with onions.

Möpkenbrot, also spelled as Möppkenbrot, is a type of cooked German sausage prepared using pork, grain, apples and raisins. Its preparation is similar to that of blood sausage. The main ingredients are bacon, pig masks (consisting of pig's head meat, rinds and skin), pork rind, pork blood, and grated rye or wheat flour. The ingredients are formed into a dough, which is then boiled, after which it is typically sliced and pan-fried. It is similar in appearance to black pudding, but it is prepared using fruit, which imbues a fruity flavor, and it is also prepared using a greater amount of flour compared to black pudding.

In Westphalia, Möpkenbrot is a traditional dish that is traditionally eaten with turnip greens. The East Westphalian variant is also called Wöpkenbrot, and is sometimes served with Stippgrütze, a Westphalian sausage prepared with barley groats cooked in sausage broth, which is enriched with meat leftovers, including offal, such as heart, kidneys or liver and seasoned with spices and salt.

== See also ==
- List of sausages
