= List of Republic of Ireland food and drink products with protected status =

A number of Irish food and drink products have been granted Protected Geographical Status under European Union law (applicable in the EU and Northern Ireland) and UK law (applicable in England, Wales and Scotland) through the Protected Designation of Origin (PDO), Protected Geographical Indication (PGI) or Traditional Speciality Guaranteed (TSG) regimes (although no TSG products from Ireland have been registered). The legislation is designed to protect regional foods and came into force in 1992.

This list is sourced from the official index published by the European Commission.

Registered:

- Clare Island Salmon (PGI)
- Connemara Hill Lamb / Uain Sléibhe Chonamara (PGI)
- Imokilly Regato (PDO)
- Irish cream (PDO, with the UK)
- Irish Poteen / Irish Poitín (PGI, with the UK)
- Irish whiskey/uisce beatha (PGI; with the UK)
- Oriel Sea Minerals (PDO)
- Oriel Sea Salt (PDO)
- Sneem Black Pudding (PGI)
- Timoleague Brown Pudding (PGI)
- Waterford Blaa/Blaa (PGI)

== See also ==
- Irish cuisine
- Northern Irish cuisine
