= Irish soda bread =

Irish quickbread

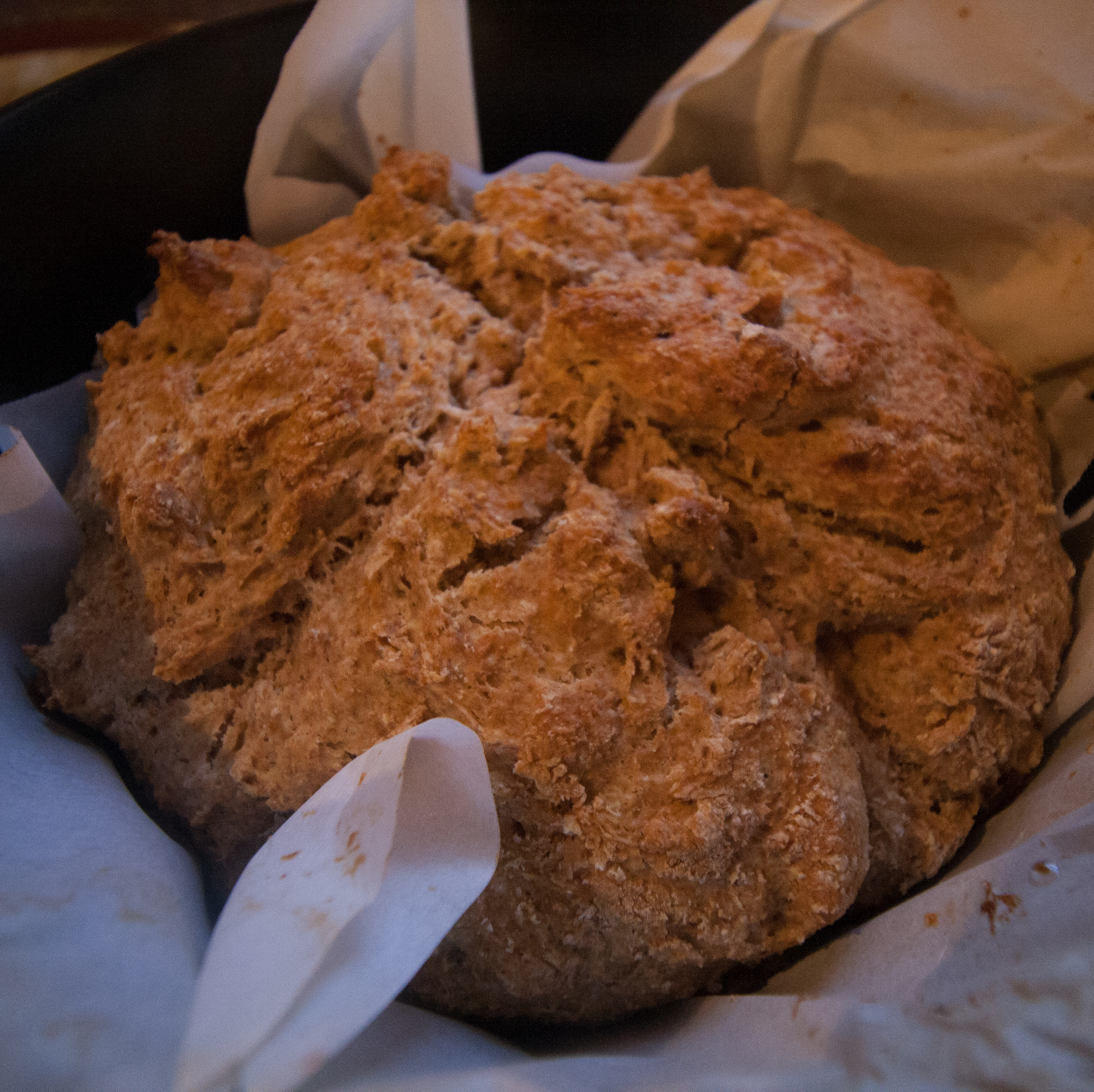
Irish soda bread

Irish soda bread is a quick bread that was developed during the early- to mid-1800s shortly after the development of bicarbonate of soda as a leavening agent. The traditional version includes only flour, buttermilk, salt and baking soda. A version using white flour and including sugar and raisins and often butter and eggs, which would have been a special-occasion loaf before the mid-1900s, is often marketed to tourists and thought of in the United States as "traditional Irish soda bread".

== Background ==
The potato reached Ireland by the end of the 16th century and, by providing a cheap source of nutrition, resulted in a large increase in population from around 1 million in the 1590s to over 8 million by the 1840s, making Ireland the most densely populated country in Europe.

In the early to mid-1600s, the potato was used primarily to supplement the traditional diet. Over time the diet of the working class became more and more reliant on the potato until by the early 1800s it was "dangerously reliant" on the potato. Potatoes, an acre of which in a good year could support a family, became the main source of calories for most of the working class. Wheat grown locally was typically exported by English landlords, was expensive, and did not contain enough gluten to produce a reliable rise with yeast; a common bread was a griddled potato bread that used potatoes rather than flour as a main ingredient.

Soda bread was first developed in the early 1800s using bicarbonate of soda rather than yeast as a leavener to allow creation of bread from Ireland's low-gluten wheat. Soda bread was known in Ireland from the 1830s and was rapidly adopted because bicarbonate of soda was a reliable and rapid leavener.

== Adoption ==
During the Great Famine of the mid-1800s, hard wheat and bicarbonate of soda were shipped from North America to feed the starving Irish population, and Ireland developed a flour-based soda bread. By the 1860s, soda bread was the common homebaked bread across the country. The higher-quality North American wheat also allowed Irish bakers to develop reliable yeasted breads.

By the mid-1900s, soda bread was popularly regarded as a poverty food and a reminder of the famine. Yeast-raised bread was seen as the more modern and sophisticated option, and consumption of soda bread decreased until yeasted bread supplanted it as the staple Irish daily bread. Starting in the 1960s the bread began appearing on upscale menus, and it became popular again in the early 2000s with the artisan food movement.

== Styles ==
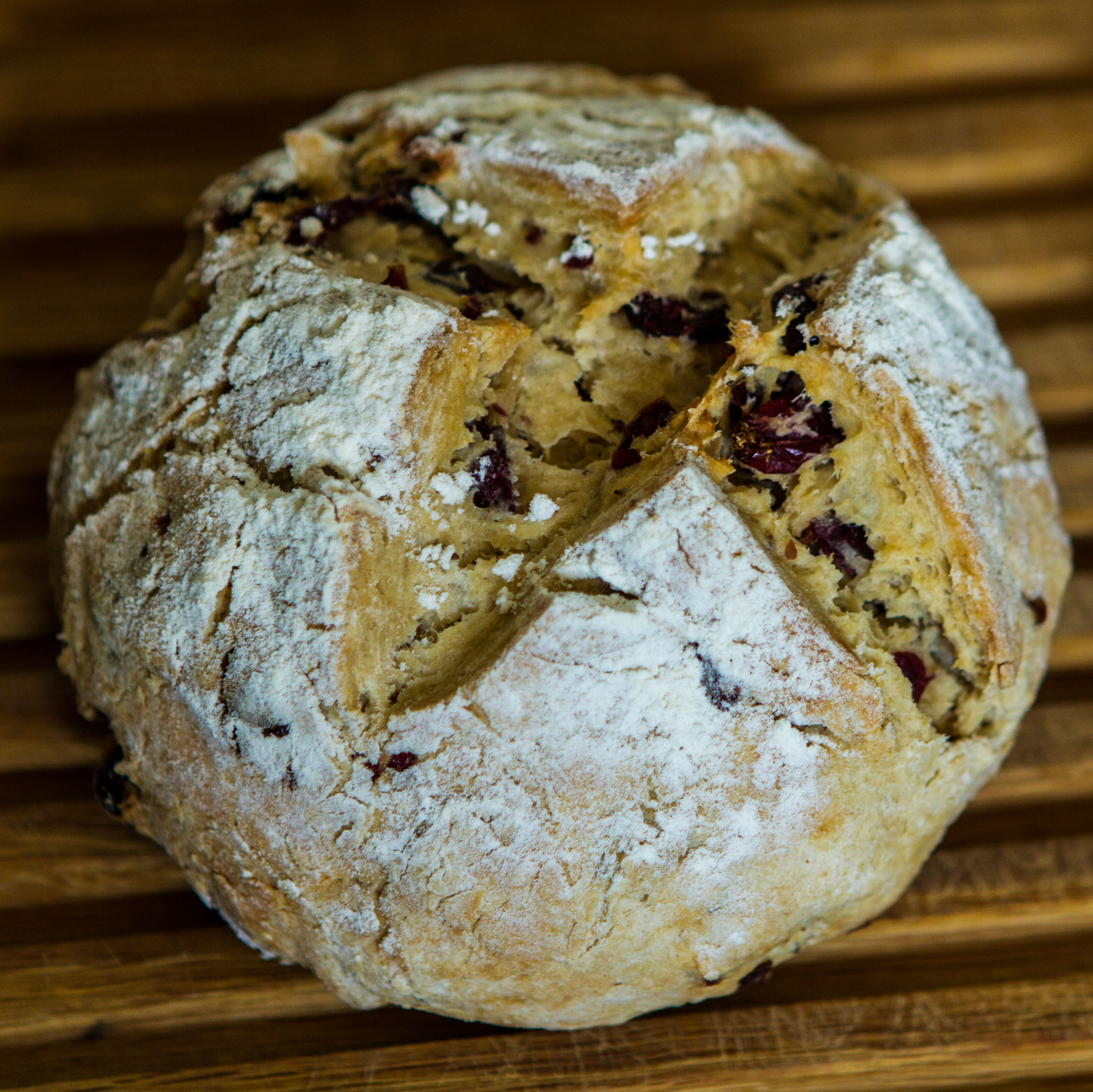
American-style Irish soda bread, with dried fruit

According to culinary historian Lucy Long, in the 1900s soda breads in Ireland developed into two distinct styles. The first is the traditional baking soda leavened loaf consisting of only flour, buttermilk, salt and baking soda which closely resembles the bread commonly homebaked for daily use throughout Ireland from the mid-1800s through the mid-1900s. It is considered a peasant food.

The second is a white-flour loaf including sugar and raisins or other dried fruit and sometimes eggs or butter, also leavened with baking soda, which traditionally would have been a special occasion bread but which is marketed to tourists as "traditional soda bread" symbolic of Irish heritage. This version is often believed by those outside of Ireland, and particularly within the United States, to be the only or true Irish soda bread. In Ireland, it is called spotted dick or spotted dog and is not commonly produced outside of tourist areas.

== Ingredients, preparation, and serving ==
The traditional ingredients include flour, which may be all white flour or a combination of all-purpose flour and whole grain flour; buttermilk; salt; and baking soda to form a very loose, wet dough of 120% hydration. The dough is typically not kneaded but handled as little as possible, roughly shaped, and deeply scored into quarters before immediately baking in a 230 °C (446 °F) oven. The tradition of scoring the dough into quarters before baking has traditional cultural significance in Ireland, whereby it served the purpose of allowing mischievous fairies to escape, as well as the symbolic cross serving as a blessing. More importantly, scoring the dough has a practical role in allowing hot air to penetrate during baking and ensure even baking. The finished bread is briefly cooled, often wrapped in a tea-towel on a wire rack to keep the crust soft. It is best eaten the day of baking.
