= Stornoway black pudding =

Blood sausage from the Western Isles, Scotland

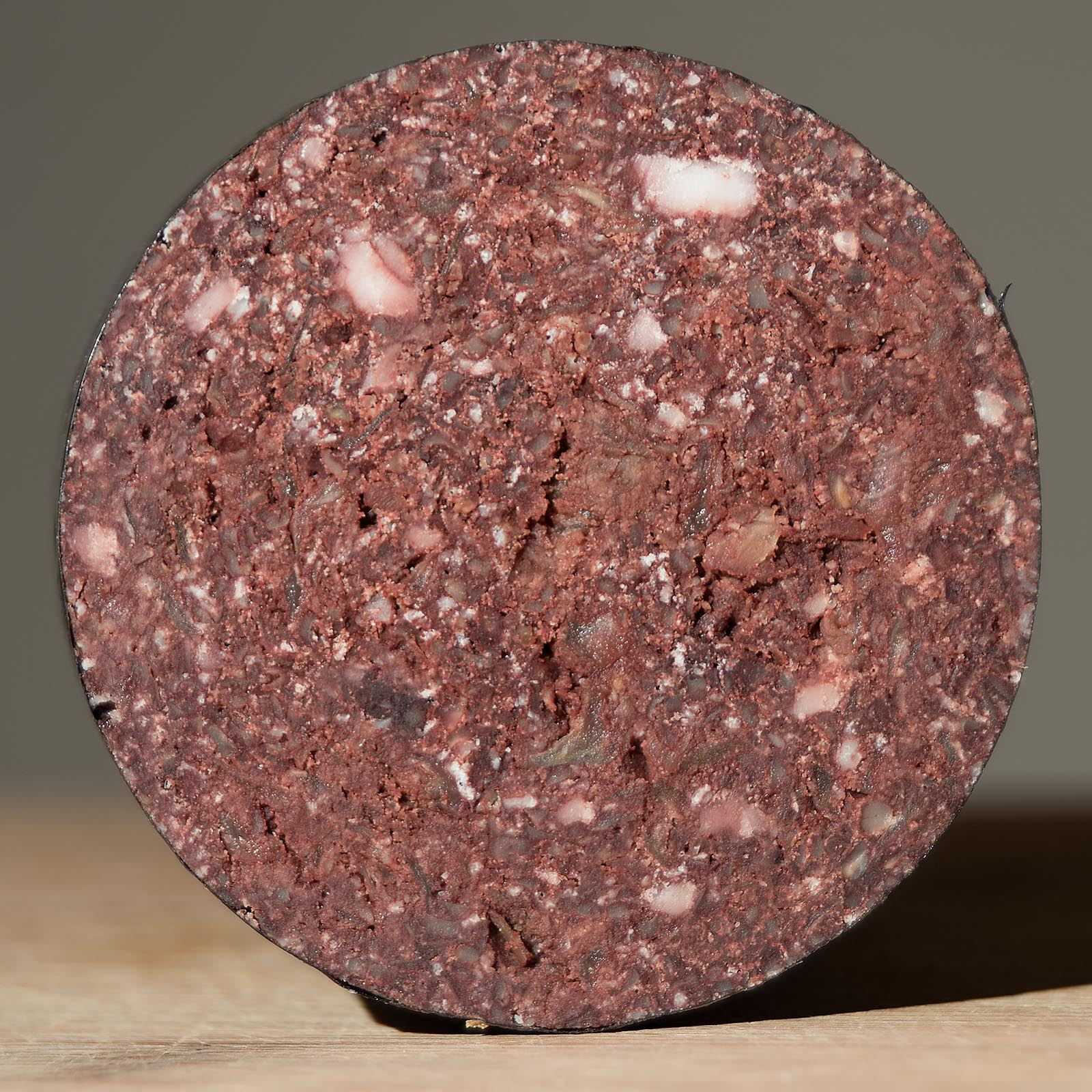
- Cross-section of a Stornoway black pudding
- Type: Sausage
- Place of origin: Scotland
- Region or state: Outer Hebrides
- Associated cuisine: Scottish
- Main ingredients: Suet, oatmeal, onion, animal blood

Stornoway black pudding is a type of black pudding (Scottish Gaelic: marag-dhubh) made in the Western Isles of Scotland. Commercial recipes include beef suet, oatmeal, onion and animal blood, in sausage casings made from cellulose or intestines.

== Protected geographical indication ==
An application for protected geographical indication status came about after the food was threatened by "impostor puddings" labelled as Stornoway, but made outside of the Western Isles. The application was made in January 2009, and protected status was granted in May 2013.

The government's application on behalf of the sausagemakers' association explained:

They are moist and firm in texture, with discernible, yet small, fat particulates. The Scottish oatmeal used in Stornoway Black Puddings is responsible for its good, rough texture. Stornoway Black Puddings may be cooked in, or out of the skin, they maintain their shape well throughout the cooking process. Once cooked, they appear almost black and break apart very easily when cut, yet do not significantly crumble. The meaty flavour is moist, rich, full, savoury, well seasoned—but not spicy—with a non-greasy, pleasant mouth-feel and clean after taste.

== See also ==
- List of sausages
