= Black pudding =

British and Irish blood sausage

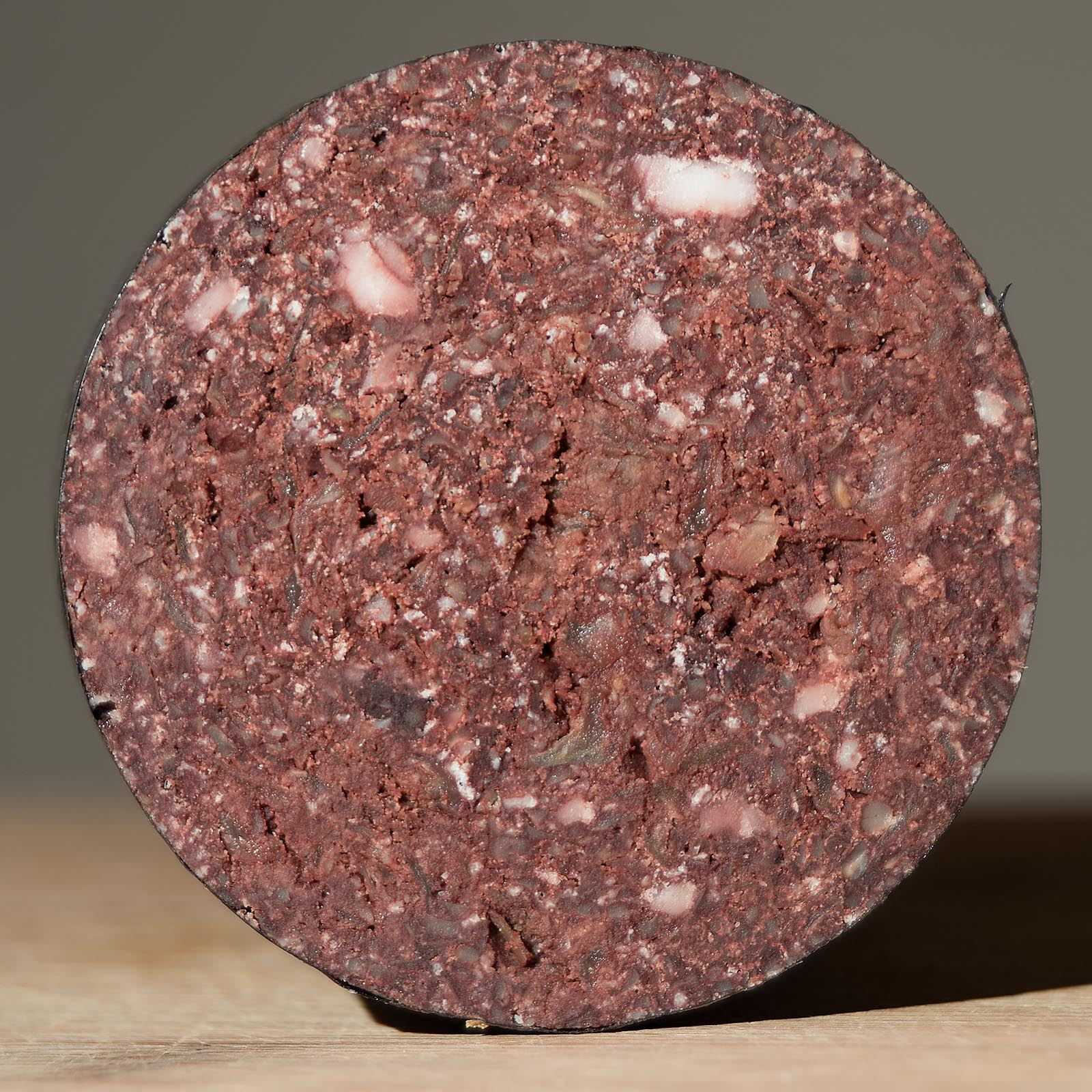
- Cross section of a Stornoway black pudding
- Alternative names: Scottish Gaelic: marag dhubh, Irish: putóg dhubh Welsh: poten waed, poten ddu, gwaedogen
- Place of origin: United Kingdom and Ireland
- Region or state: England, Ireland, Scotland, Wales
- Associated cuisine: United Kingdom and Ireland
- Serving temperature: Hot, occasionally cold
- Main ingredients: Pork blood, fat, oats, or barley
- Ingredients generally used: Mint, thyme, marjoram, spices
- Variations: Drisheen, Sneem Black Pudding, Stornoway black pudding
- Similar dishes: Blodplättar, Slátur, Mustamakkara

Black pudding is a type of blood sausage originating in the United Kingdom and Ireland. It is made from pork or occasionally beef blood, with pork fat or beef suet, and a cereal, usually oatmeal, oat groats, or barley groats. The high proportion of cereal, along with the use of certain herbs, distinguishes black pudding from other blood sausages.

== Etymology ==
The word pudding comes from the French boudin, originally from the Latin botellus, meaning "small sausage".

== History and recipes ==
Black puddings are often considered to be one of the oldest forms of sausage. Animals are generally bled at slaughter, and as blood rapidly spoils unless prepared in some way, making a pudding with it is one of the easiest ways of ensuring it does not go to waste. While the majority of modern black pudding recipes involve pork blood, this has not always been the case. Sheep or cow blood was also used, and one 15th-century English recipe used that of a porpoise in a pudding eaten exclusively by the nobility. Until at least the 19th century, cow or sheep blood was the usual basis for black puddings in Scotland; Jamieson's Scottish dictionary defined "black pudding" as "a pudding made of the blood of a cow or sheep".

As a product of the slaughtering process, eating black puddings was historically associated with Martinmas, when the annual slaughter of livestock took place. By the 19th century black pudding manufacture was linked with towns known for their large markets for pork, such as Stretford, then in Lancashire, and Cork, Ireland. By this time, black puddings were generally omitted from recipe books aimed at urban housewives, as they no longer usually had access to home-killed pork, although recipes continued to appear in Scottish books until the 20th century.

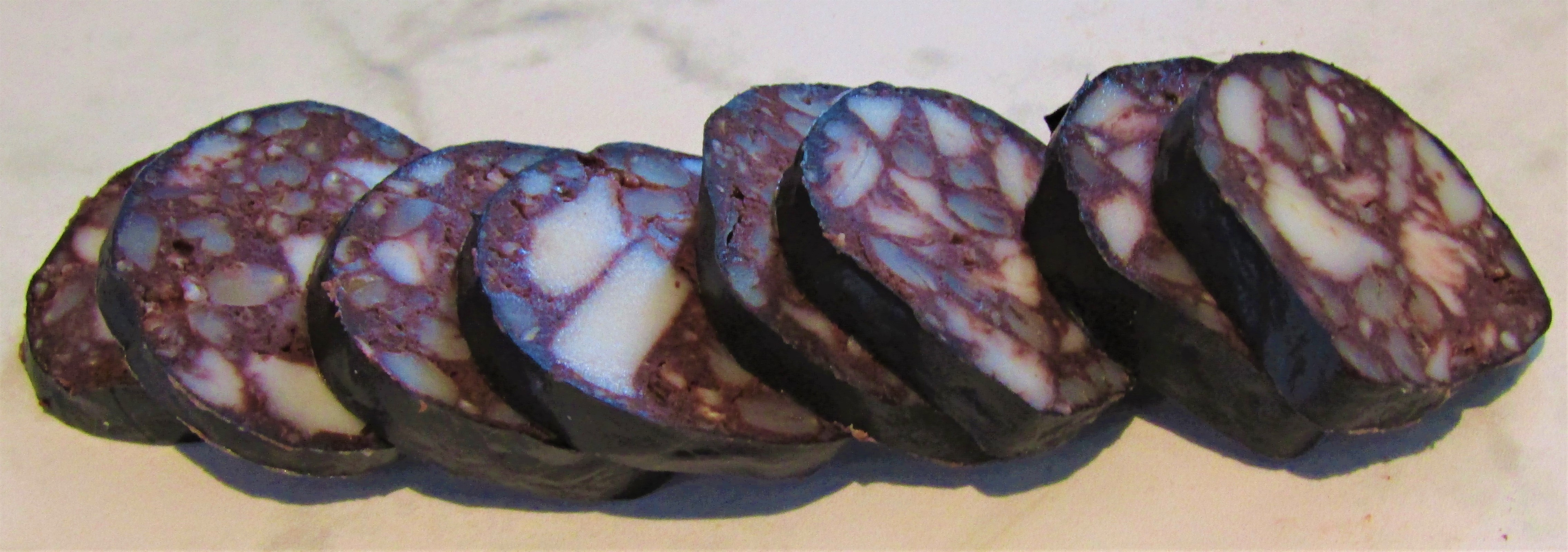
Sliced black pudding

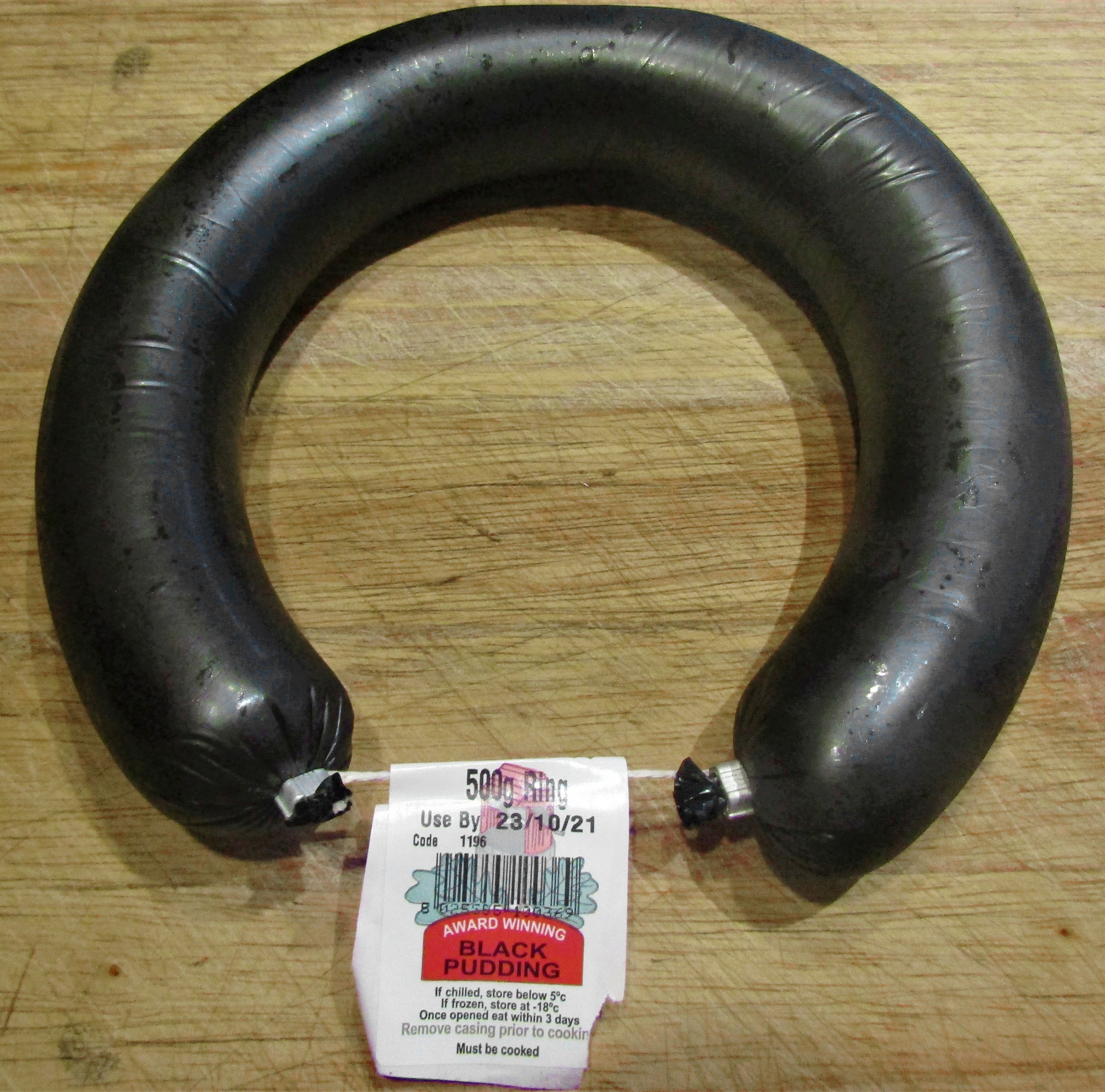
Black pudding ring

Most traditional recipes from the UK involve stirring the fresh blood, adding fat and some form of rusk, and seasoning, before filling the mixture into a casing and boiling it. Natural casings of beef intestine were formerly used, though modern commercially made puddings use synthetic cellulose skins, and are usually produced from imported dried blood. The relatively limited range of ingredients and use of oats or barley to thicken and absorb the blood is typical of black pudding in comparison to Continental blood sausages. Despite this, black pudding recipes still show more regional variation across the islands than other sausages, with many butchers having their own individual versions. Breadcrumbs or flour are sometimes used to supplement the oats or barley, and the proportion and texture of the fat or suet used can also vary widely. Pennyroyal, marjoram, thyme, and mint are all traditional flavourings: pennyroyal was known as pudding-yerb in the North Riding of Yorkshire for its use in black puddings. Other herbs and spices sometimes used in traditional black puddings include cumin, rue, and parsley.

While the dish has been known as black pudding for centuries, blak podyngs having been recorded c. 1450, a number of dialect names have also been used for the dish, such as black pot (in Somerset), and bloody pot.

== Regional popularity ==
In the United Kingdom, black pudding is especially associated with the Black Country, the North West and Scotland; it is considered a particular delicacy in Stornoway and in Lancashire, notably in towns such as Bury, where it is traditionally boiled and served with malt vinegar out of a paper wrapping. It was also found in Yorkshire, where black puddings were flavoured with lemon thyme and savory: Barnsley black puddings were particularly well-known. The Stornoway black pudding, made in the Western Isles of Scotland, has been granted Protected Geographical Indicator of Origin status. In the wake of this designation, butchers in Bury sought to demonstrate their history of manufacturing and selling the product. One such claim dates back to 1810. Having been brought there by immigrants, black pudding is now part of the local cuisine of the Canadian provinces of Nova Scotia and Newfoundland and Labrador.

In Ireland, in addition to the more general type of black pudding, there is a distinct regional variety called drisheen, which is particularly associated with Cork. Drisheen is usually made from cow's blood, although until the recent past it was often also made with sheep blood, and was sometimes flavoured with tansy. Sneem Black Pudding is a local variety produced in County Kerry; it has Protected Geographical Indication (PGI) status.

== Consumption ==
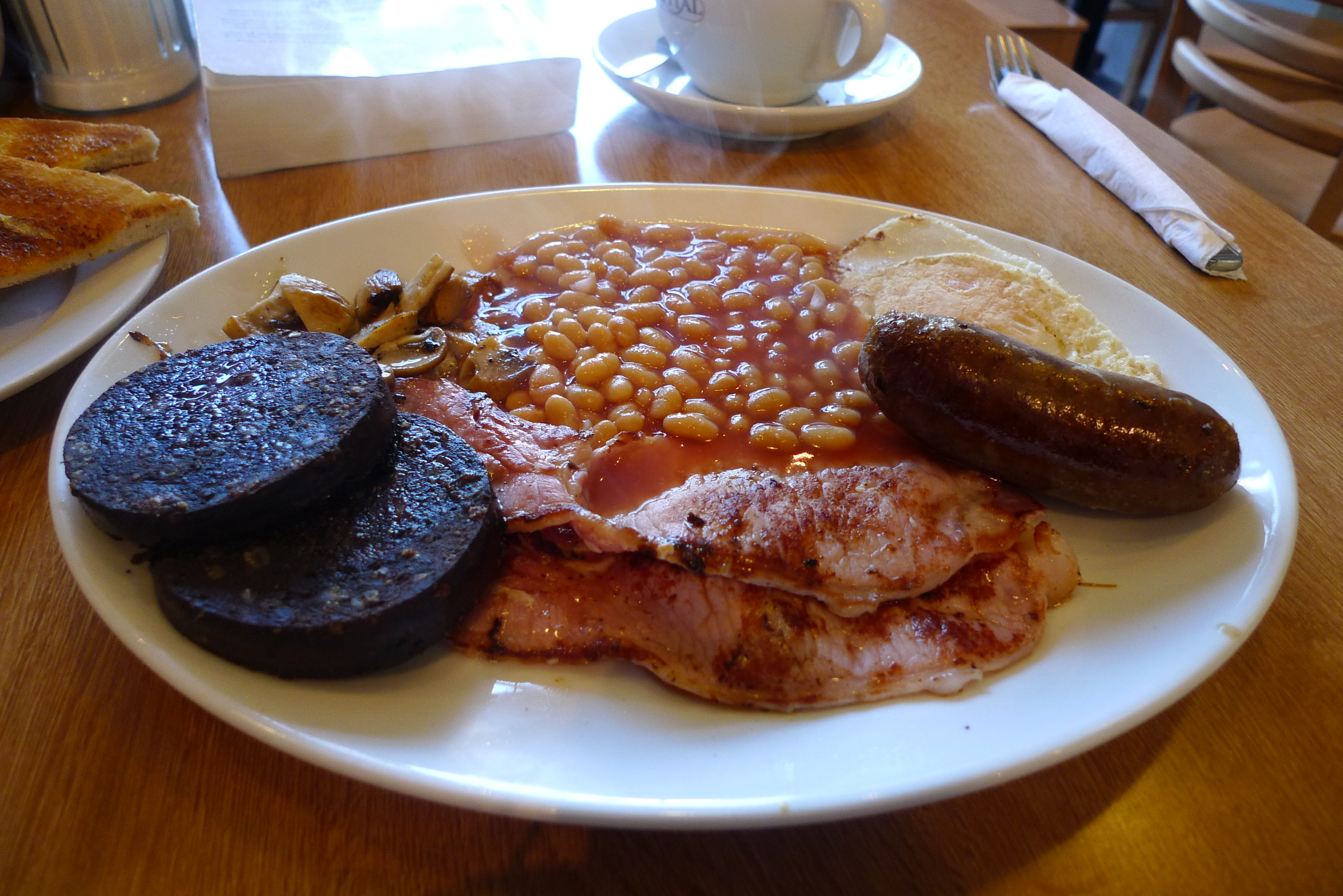
Black pudding (left) as part of a full breakfast

Black pudding can be grilled, fried, baked, or boiled in its skin. It can also be eaten cold, as it is cooked in production.

In parts of north-western England and in the Black Country, it was usual to serve a whole black pudding boiled as a complete meal, with bread or potatoes. Elsewhere in the UK and Ireland, slices of fried or grilled black pudding are more usually served as part of a traditional full breakfast, a tradition that followed British and Irish emigrants around the world.

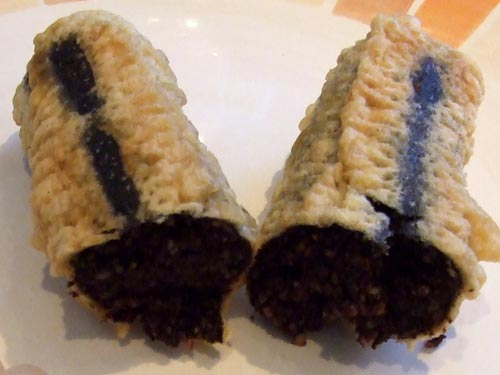
A single battered, deep-fried, chip shop, black pudding (approx. 20 cm or 8 in long), sliced open

Some chip shops, particularly in Scotland and Northern England sell deep-fried, battered black pudding.

Novel culinary uses for black pudding include black pudding ice cream, while perhaps a more conventional modern recipe is using it as an accompaniment to scallops. Scotch eggs made with black pudding, such as the "Manchester egg", have become common.

== Nutrition ==
Black pudding is a good source of protein; it is low in carbohydrates and high in zinc and iron. It has been described as a "superfood" because of these nutritional qualities, although many recipes are also very high in saturated fat and salt.

== Festivals ==
Since the 1980s, the World Black Pudding Throwing Championships has been held annually in Ramsbottom, Bury, Greater Manchester. The humorous competition invokes the traditional Lancashire – Yorkshire rivalry, with participants throwing the black puddings at piles of Yorkshire puddings. It takes place in September, and draws thousands of competitors and spectators.

In past years, the Bacup Food and Black Pudding Festival has been held in Bacup, Lancashire.

There is an annual European Black Pudding competition held in the Halles de Boudin in Mortagne-au-Perche, Normandy.

== See also ==
- List of sausages
- Black soup
- Boudin
- Haggis
- Kaszanka
- Kishka
- Möpkenbrot – German pork and grain sausage
- Pig blood curd
- Red pudding
- White pudding
