= Grünkohlessen =

Traditional wintertime festival

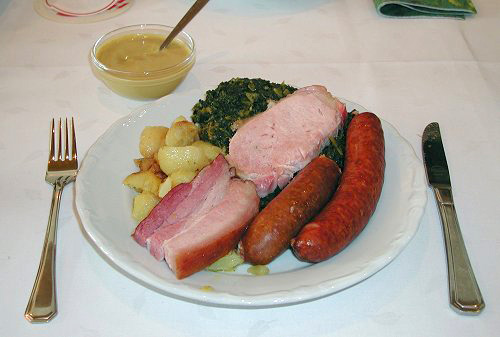
Grünkohl dish with German fries, Pinkel, Kochwurst, Kassler, bacon and mustard

Grünkohlessen (Danish: Grønlangkål, Dutch: Boerenkool) is an old wintertime custom in North Germany, and parts of Scandinavia (Denmark and Scania), involving drinking, games, and a feast of regional dishes, typically featuring kale, potatoes, and sausages. It is practised in the Free Hanseatic City of Bremen and its surrounding districts of Osterholz, Diepholz, Verden and Rotenburg, in Oldenburg Land, the County of Bentheim, Emsland, Osnabrück Land and East Frisia, in the Middle Weser Region, and also in Hamburg, Cuxhaven, in the Hanover Region, Hildesheim region, Brunswick Land, in the Magdeburg region, in Westphalia and Schleswig-Holstein.

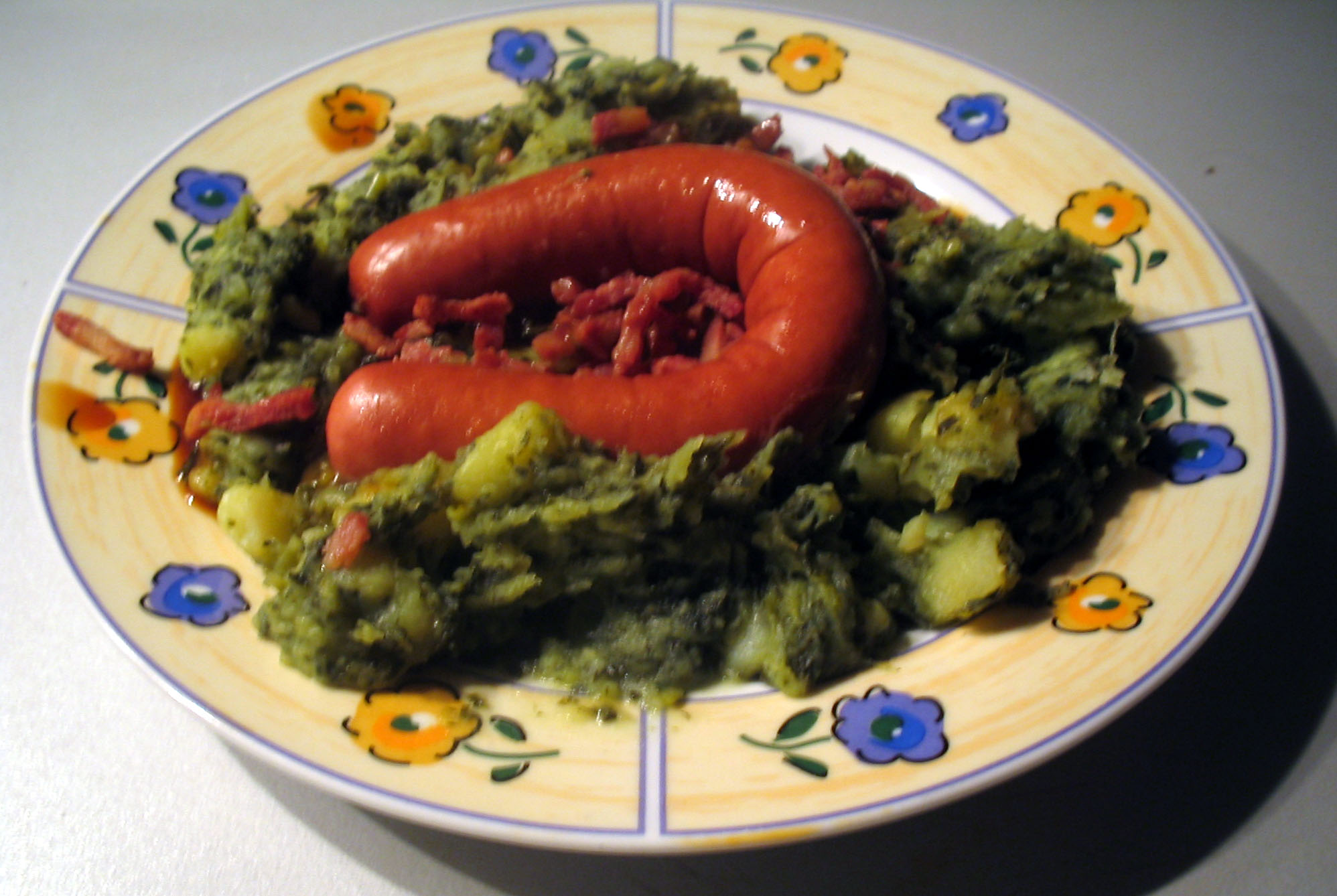
Boerenkool (stamppot of curly kale) with rookworst.

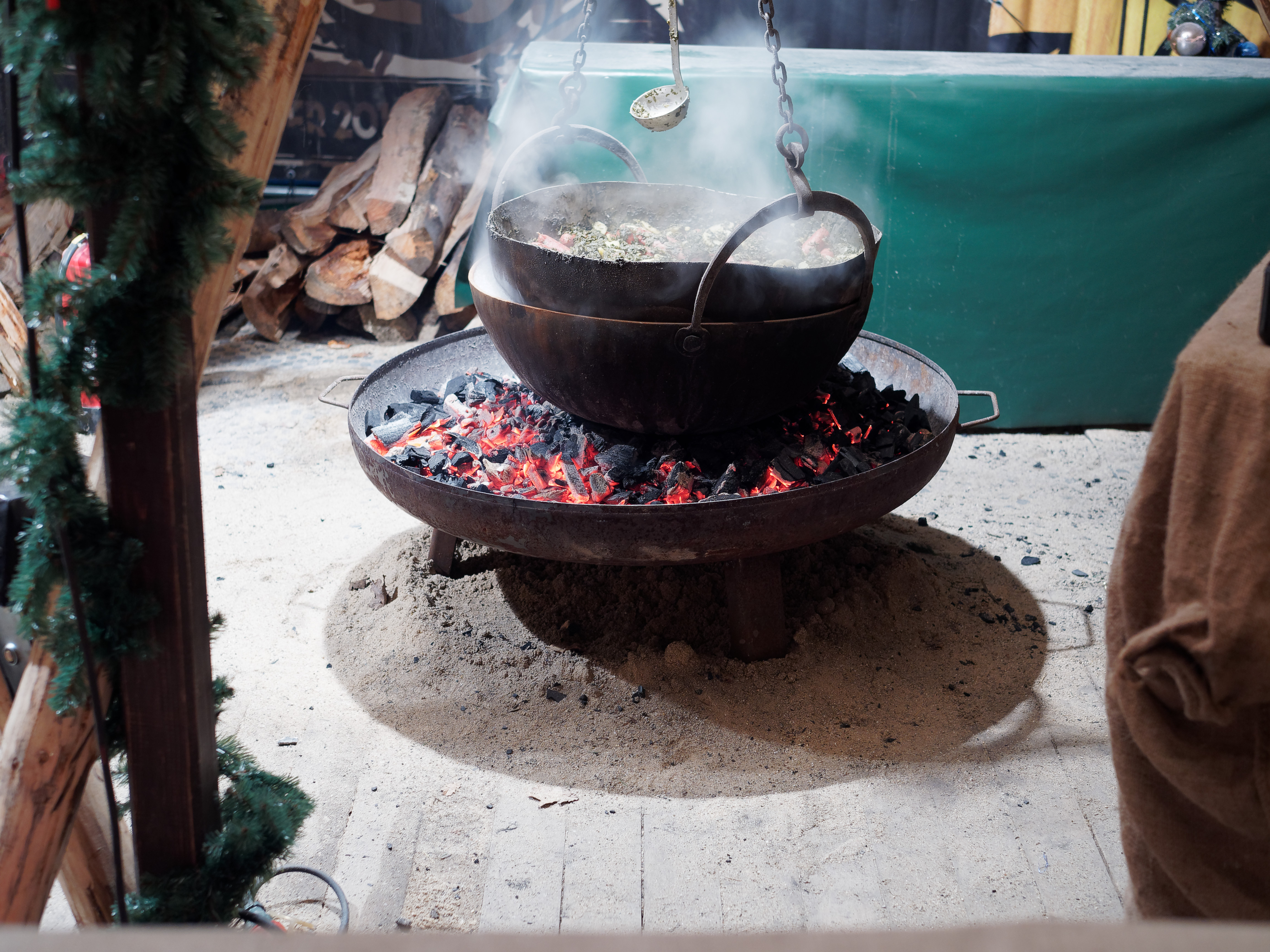
Cooking Gruenkohl outdoor at a medieval market at Dortmund, Germany

Grünkohl (similar to Braunkohl and the Dutch boerenkool but with curly cale instead of cabbage, and creamed) is curly-leafed kale, a type of cabbage, traditionally harvested after the first autumn frost. The late harvest of kale ensures that its bitter-tasting constituents have disappeared, although modern kale varieties are generally low on bitter components and are harvested as early as in September.

The participants in a Kohlfahrt ("cabbage walk") arrange a walk through the countryside to a village pub, usually in mid-winter. Often this walk is linked with cross-country games such as Boßeln. As fortification against the frosty weather and in preparation for the hearty meal, an ample supply of alcoholic beverages, such as korn, or, for sailors, sherry, is taken in a shopping trolley or handcart, and is handed out as part of the games or at points along the walk (e.g. at crossroads or pylons). At the village pub the merry walkers are served with Grünkohl and, depending on the region, with German fries or boiled potatoes and Kassler, Bregenwurst, Pinkel or Kohlwurst. In addition there is also a lot to drink: (beer and/or Korn) allegedly to aid the digestion. In many areas there is also music and dancing after the meal.

The Grünkohlessen reaches its climax in the proclamation of the Kohlkönig ("cabbage king") or the Kohlkönigspaar ("royal cabbage couple"). Various methods are used to award the royal title. Either the number of portions consumed is added up, the weight of the participants before and after the meal is measured or the results of the games during the walk are used. The Kohlkönig is singled out as the last to leave the table. This excludes visits to the toilet and dancing breaks. As a visible sign of royalty, chains with the history of the Kohlkönigs of this group or a pig's jawbone with an appropriate inscription are worn. The king or royal couple have the responsibility of organising the following year's Grünkohlessen.

Because many firms, street communities and clubs organise Grünkohlessen in the winter months, at popular times (Saturdays in January and February) village inns are often fully booked several weeks in advance.

One of the biggest Grünkohlessen events has taken place since 2007 in Hamburg. In the Fish Auction Hall near the St Pauli Landungsbrücken several regional companies together with the food and drink industry organise a joint event, the Grünkohl-Schlemmerfest, in which more than 1500 paying guests take part.

The Defftig Ollnborger Gröönkohl-Äten ("hearty Oldenburg kale feast") in Berlin, by contrast, is an event run by the political rural conservation group from Oldenburg Land in the capital city.

== See also ==
- Danish cuisine
- Dutch cuisine
- Grünkohl
- Lower Saxon cuisine
- Schleswig-Holstein cuisine
- Swedish cuisine
