= Champ (food) =

Irish potato dish

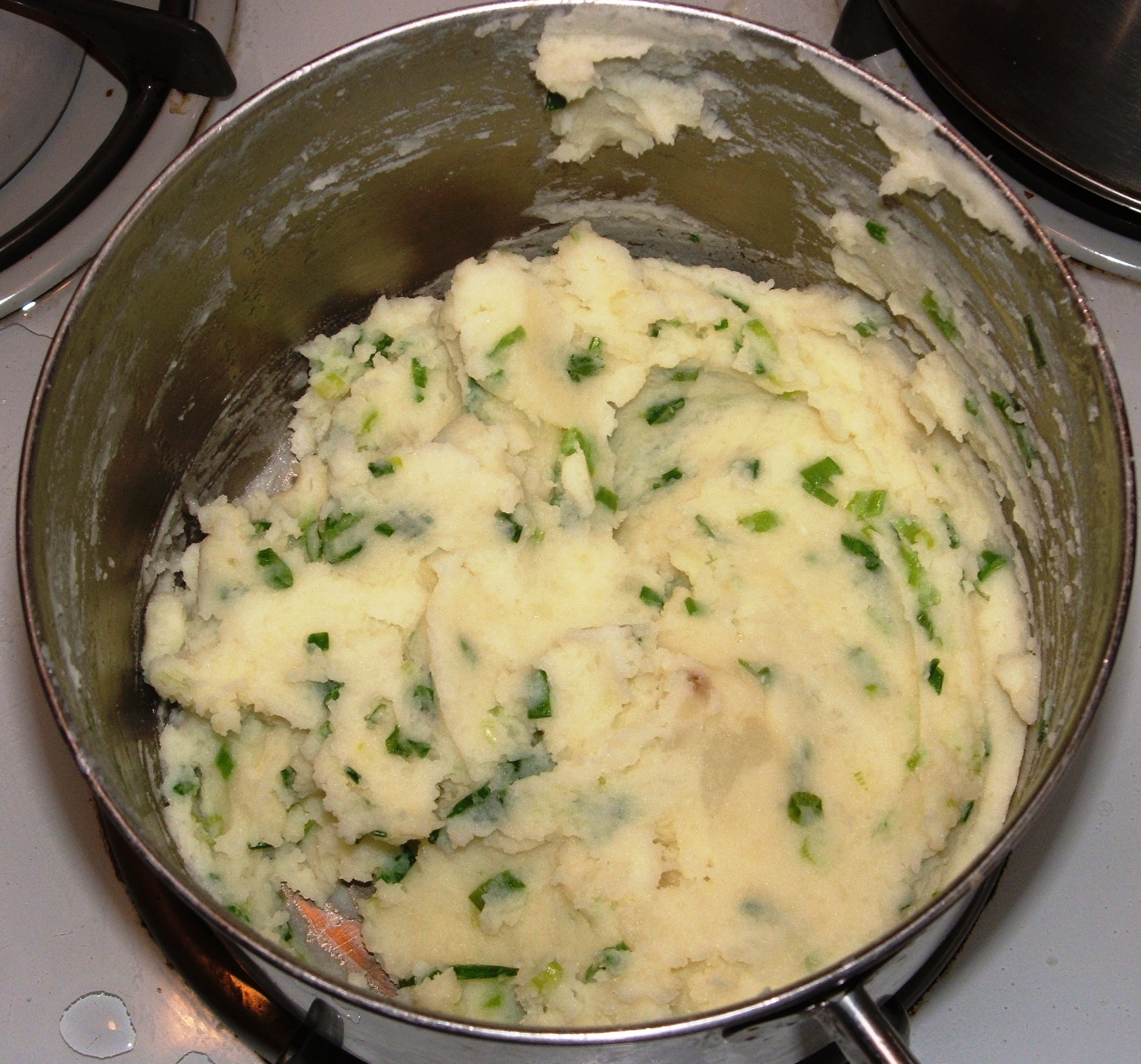
- Alternative names: Poundies
- Place of origin: Ireland
- Main ingredients: Mashed potatoes, scallions, butter, milk

Champ (Irish: brúitín [ˈbˠɾˠuːtʲiːnʲ]) is an Irish dish of mashed potatoes with scallions, butter and milk.

== Description ==
Champ is made by combining mashed potatoes with chopped spring onions, butter, milk, and, optionally, salt and pepper. In some areas it was made with stinging nettle, or dillisk rather than scallions. In some areas the dish is also called "poundies".

Champ is similar to another Irish dish, colcannon, which uses kale or cabbage in place of scallions. Champ is popular in Ulster, where it would be served in a bowl, with a hole filled with butter in the centre. It was customary to make champ with the first new potatoes harvested.

In Dublin, the dish was known as "cally" and was made with green onions. Another version called "pandy" is served to children, made with floury potatoes, butter and milk or cream.

The word champ has also been adopted into the popular Hiberno-English phrase to be "as thick as champ", meaning to be stupid, ill-tempered or sullen.

== Samhain ==
The dish is associated with Samhain, and would be served on that night. In many parts of Ireland, it was tradition to offer a portion of champ to the fairies by placing a dish of champ with a spoon at the foot of a hawthorn.

== Similar dishes ==
- Clapshot
- Stovies
- Bubble and squeak, from England
- Colcannon from Ireland
- Brændende kærlighed, from Denmark
- Trinxat, from the Empordà region of Catalonia, northeast Spain, and Andorra
- Roupa velha (Portuguese for "old clothes"), from Portugal, often made from leftovers from cozido à portuguesa
- Stamppot, from the Netherlands
- Stoemp, from Belgium
- Hash, from the United States
- Hash browns
- Potato cake

== See also ==
- List of Irish dishes
- List of onion dishes
- List of potato dishes
- Irish cuisine
- Northern Irish cuisine
