= Stoemp =

Belgian potato dish

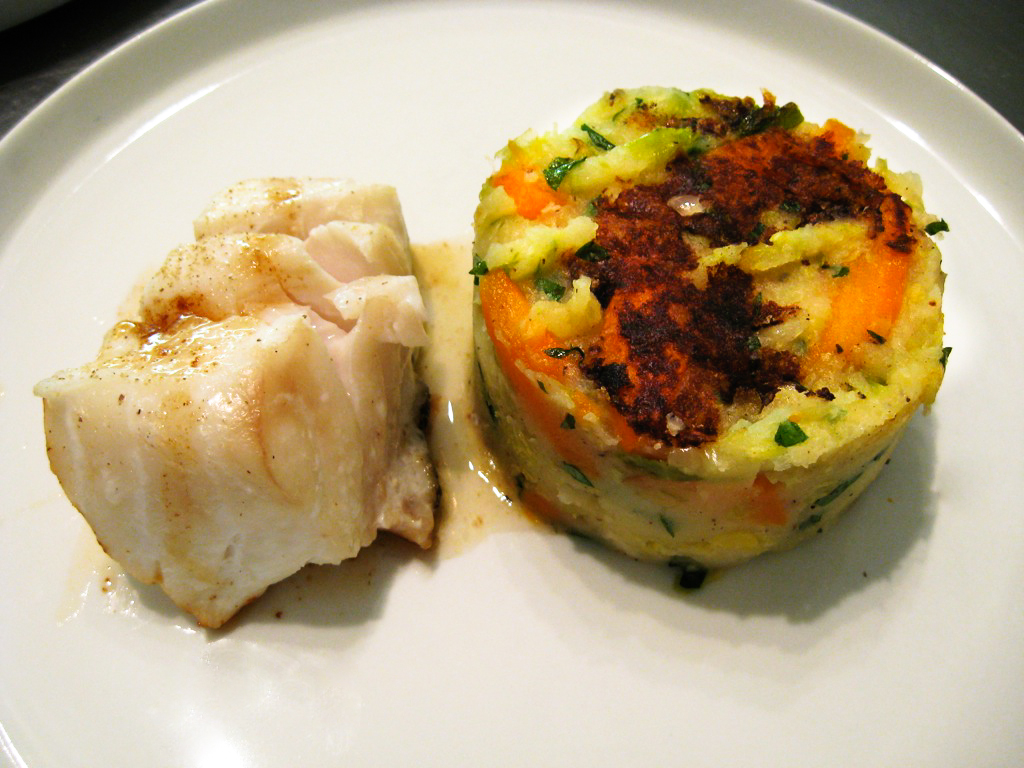
- Cod with stoemp (right)
- Course: Side dish
- Place of origin: Belgium, France, Netherlands
- Main ingredients: Potatoes, Vegetables
- Variations: Wortelstoemp

Stoemp is a Flemish dish, found in Belgium, Northern France and the Netherlands, of pureed or mashed potatoes and other root vegetables, and can also include cream, bacon, onion or shallot, herbs, and spices.

The name of the dish sometimes includes the kind of vegetables inside it; for example, Wortelstoemp includes carrots (wortel). This specific combination may also contain egg yolk.

== Pronunciation ==
Stoemp is pronounced [stump]. It is originally a word from Brabantian dialects.

== Ingredients and culture ==
A simple, rural dish, stoemp enjoys wide appeal.

It is a dish of mashed potatoes with one or more vegetables, such as onions, carrots, leeks, spinach, green peas and cabbage, seasoned with thyme, nutmeg or bayleaf.

Stoemp is traditionally featured alongside fried boudin, fried braadworst, grilled bacon, fried mince or fried eggs. In some families, it is served with an entrecôte or a horse tenderloin.

== Similar dishes ==
- Bubble and squeak, from England.
- Colcannon and champ, from Ireland.
- Rumbledethumps, from Scotland
- Pyttipanna, from Sweden
- Biksemad, from Denmark
- Trinxat, from the Empordà region of Catalonia, northeast Spain, and Andorra
- Roupa velha (Portuguese for "old clothes"), from Portugal, often made from leftovers from cozido à portuguesa
- Stamppot from The Netherlands
- Hash (food), from the United States
- Eintopf, from northern Germany
- Also see hash browns and potato cake entries
