= Colcannon =

Irish potato dish

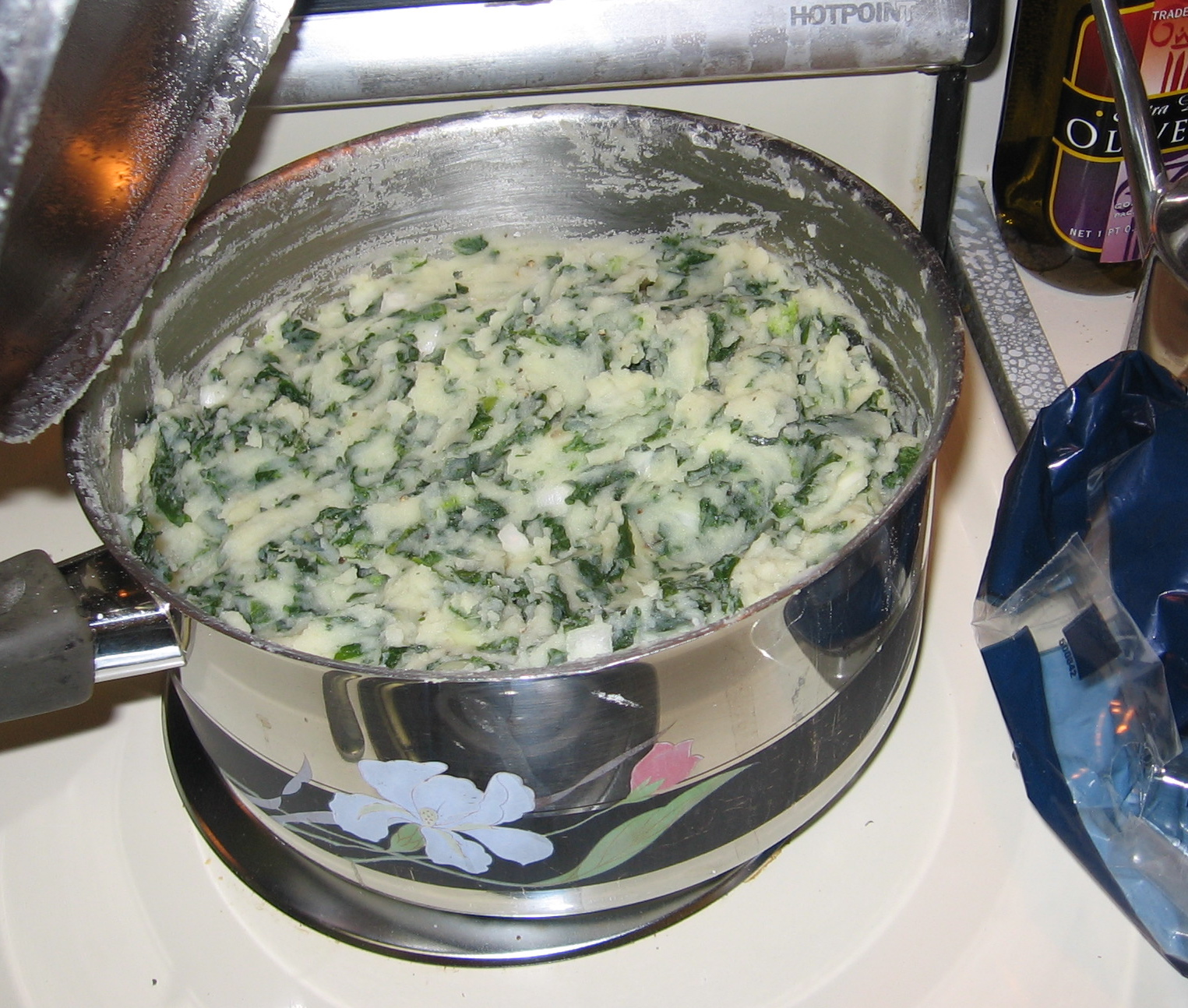
- A pot of freshly made colcannon
- Place of origin: Ireland
- Main ingredients: Mashed potatoes, kale or cabbage

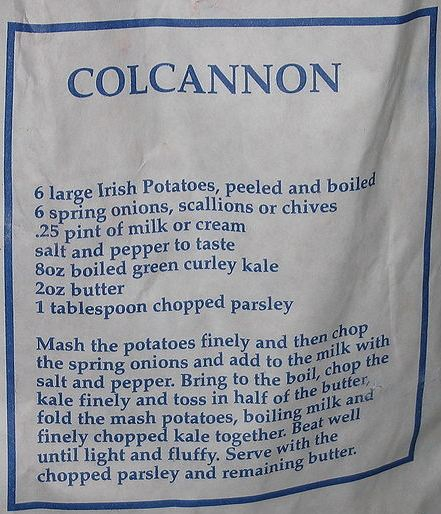
Colcannon recipe on a bag of potatoes

Colcannon (Irish: cál ceannann, meaning 'white-headed cabbage' [ˌkaːlˠ ˈcan̪ˠən̪ˠ]) is a traditional Irish dish of mashed potatoes with cabbage. It is a popular dish on Saint Patrick's Day and on the feast day of St. Brigid.

== Description ==
Colcannon is most commonly made with only four ingredients: potatoes, butter, milk and cabbage. Irish historian Patrick Weston Joyce defined it as "potatoes mashed with butter and milk, with chopped up cabbage and pot herbs". It can contain other ingredients such as scallions (spring onions), leeks, laverbread, onions and chives. Some recipes substitute cabbage with kale. There are many regional variations of this staple dish. It was a cheap, year-round food. It is often eaten with boiled ham, salt pork or Irish bacon. As a side dish it can be paired with corned beef and cabbage.

Colcannon is similar to champ, a dish made with scallions, butter and milk that is traditionally offered to fairies in a spoon placed at the foot of a hawthorn tree.

== Etymology ==
The origin of the word is unclear. The first syllable "col" likely comes from the Irish cál meaning kale. The second syllable may derive from ceann-fhionn, meaning a white head (i.e. "a white head of cabbage"). This usage is also found in the Irish name for a coot, a white-headed bird known as cearc cheannan or "white-head hen".

In Welsh, the name for leek soup is cawl cennin, a phrase combining cawl meaning "soup", "broth" or "gruel", when it is not a reference to the typical Welsh meat and vegetable stew named in full cawl Cymreig, with cennin, the plural of cenhinen, meaning "leeks".

== Song ==
The song "Colcannon", also called "The Skillet Pot" and "Yes You Did," is a popular Irish song (Roud 9485) first recorded in 1913 by Irish vaudeville performer Shaun O'Nolan, who is believed to have written the lyrics, set to an existing Irish hornpipe melody, "The First of May".

It has been recorded by numerous artists, including Mary Black. It begins:

Did you ever eat Colcannon, made from lovely pickled cream?
With the greens and scallions mingled like a picture in a dream.
Did you ever make a hole on top to hold the melting flake
Of the creamy, flavoured butter that your mother used to make?

The chorus:

Yes you did, so you did, so did he and so did I.
And the more I think about it sure the nearer I'm to cry.
Oh, wasn't it the happy days when troubles we had not,
And our mothers made Colcannon in the little skillet pot.

== Similar dishes ==
- Clapshot, stovies, and rumbledethumps, from Scotland
- Bubble and squeak, from England
- Champ, from Ireland
- Biksemad, from Denmark
- Trinxat, from the Empordà region of Catalonia, northeast Spain, and Andorra
- Roupa velha (Portuguese for "old clothes"), from Portugal, often made from leftovers from cozido à Portuguesa
- Boerenkool stamppot, from the Netherlands
- Stoemp, from Belgium
- Hash, from the United States
- Hash browns
- Potato cake

== See also ==
- List of cabbage dishes
- List of Irish dishes
- List of potato dishes
