= Schleswig-Holstein cuisine =

Culinary traditions of Schleswig-Holstein, Germany

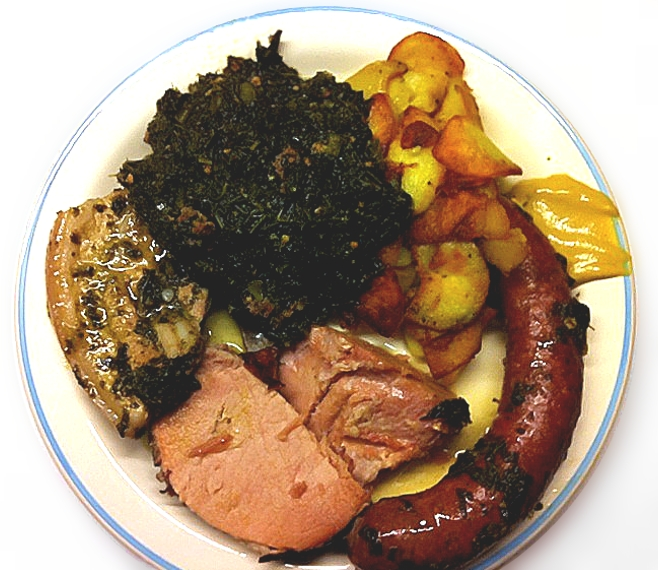
A typical dish of Schleswig-Holstein is Grünkohl mit Kassler

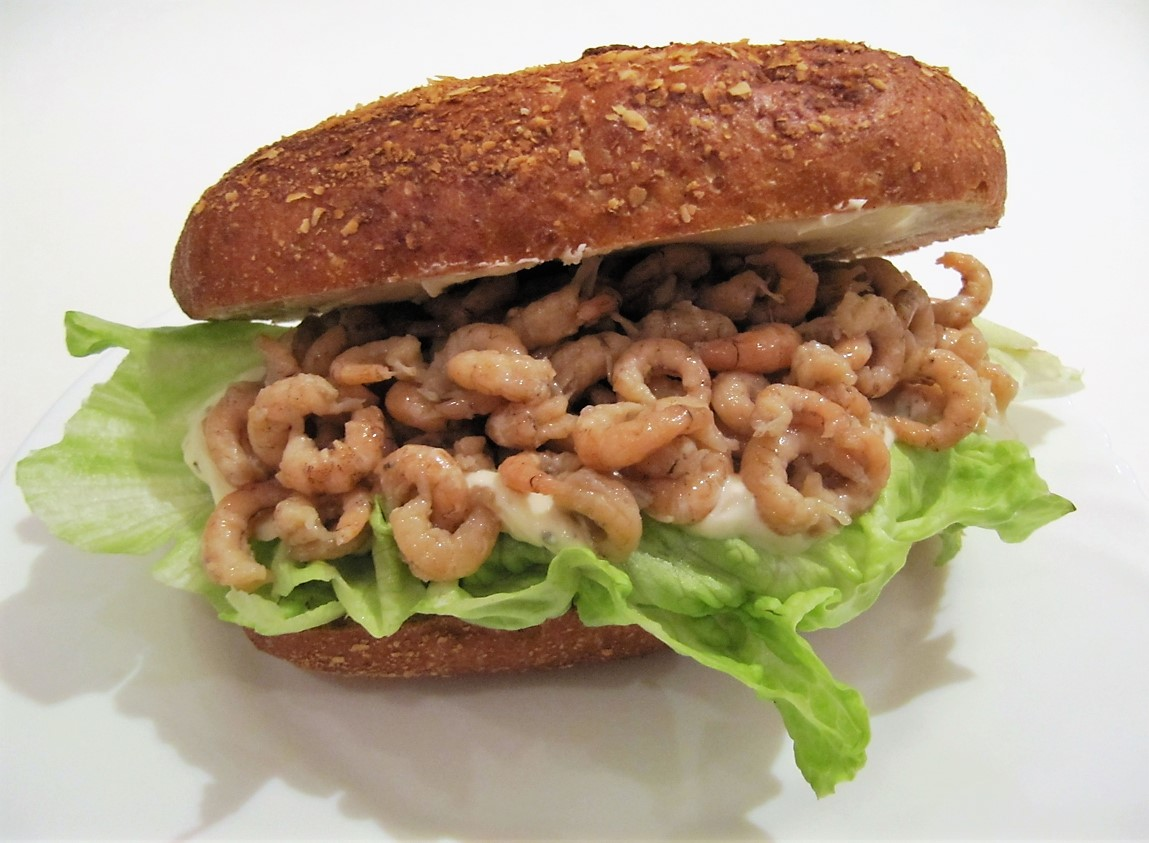
Nordseekrabben served on a sandwich roll.

The cuisine of Schleswig-Holstein forms part of the German cuisine in which the different influences of the regions Niedersachsen and Friesland and of Denmark are perceptible. The proximity to the sea and the harsh climate play a great role and determine which ingredients are available.

== Typical dishes ==
One of the most known dishes of Schleswig-Holstein is Birnen, Bohnen und Speck. Other very popular dishes include:

- Grünkohl with Kochwurst and Schweinebacke (a cured cut from a pig's head), sometimes with Pinkel
- Saure Rolle (a kind of sour sausage)
- Danish Rote Grütze (preferably with liquid cream)
- Labskaus
- Mehlbüdel (a kind of dumpling which is served with sugar, liquid butter and pork meat)
- Schnüsch (a vegetable stew with milk)
- Rübenmalheur (a rutabaga stew)
- Holsteiner Rübenmus (mushed rutabaga, similar to Stamppot)
- Holsteiner Sauerfleisch (a kind of sour aspic)
- Fliederbeersuppe (elderberry soup)
- Swattsuer (a kind of blood soup, also known as 'Schwarzsauer')
- Buttermilchsuppe mit Klüten (buttermilk soup with flour dumplings)
- Grünkohlsuppe (a kale soup)
- Großer Hans (a kind of bread pudding)
- Nordseekrabben

Vegetables are frequently served with a butter and flour-based sauce which is called "Gestovtes Gemüse". In the city of Eiderstedt this cooking method is used to prepare rutabaga which is then served as a side dish. In Elmshorn Graue Erbsen(lit. "grey peas") have a long tradition and generally milk and meat products play an important role. Cheeses from Holtsee are considered a speciality just as Holsteiner Katenschinken.

Because of the proximity to the sea, fish plays a great role in the cuisine of Schleswig-Holstein and is featured in many dishes. Particularly typical are Maischollen, Heringe and Kieler Sprotte and carp dishes are traditionally served for New Year's Eve. Famous desserts are vanilla ice cream served with Friesischer Bohnensuppe (a local liqueur).

Especially in the rural and peasant cuisine many recipes were buried in oblivion since the mid of 20th century such as Mädchenröte (a dessert made of egg whites and cassis), Förtchen (a kind of pastry), a precursor of the famous Berliner, Munkmarscher Muscheltopf (a seafood stew), Kalbfleischpudding or filled breast of pork, which is one of the many dishes with sweet and sugary side dishes.

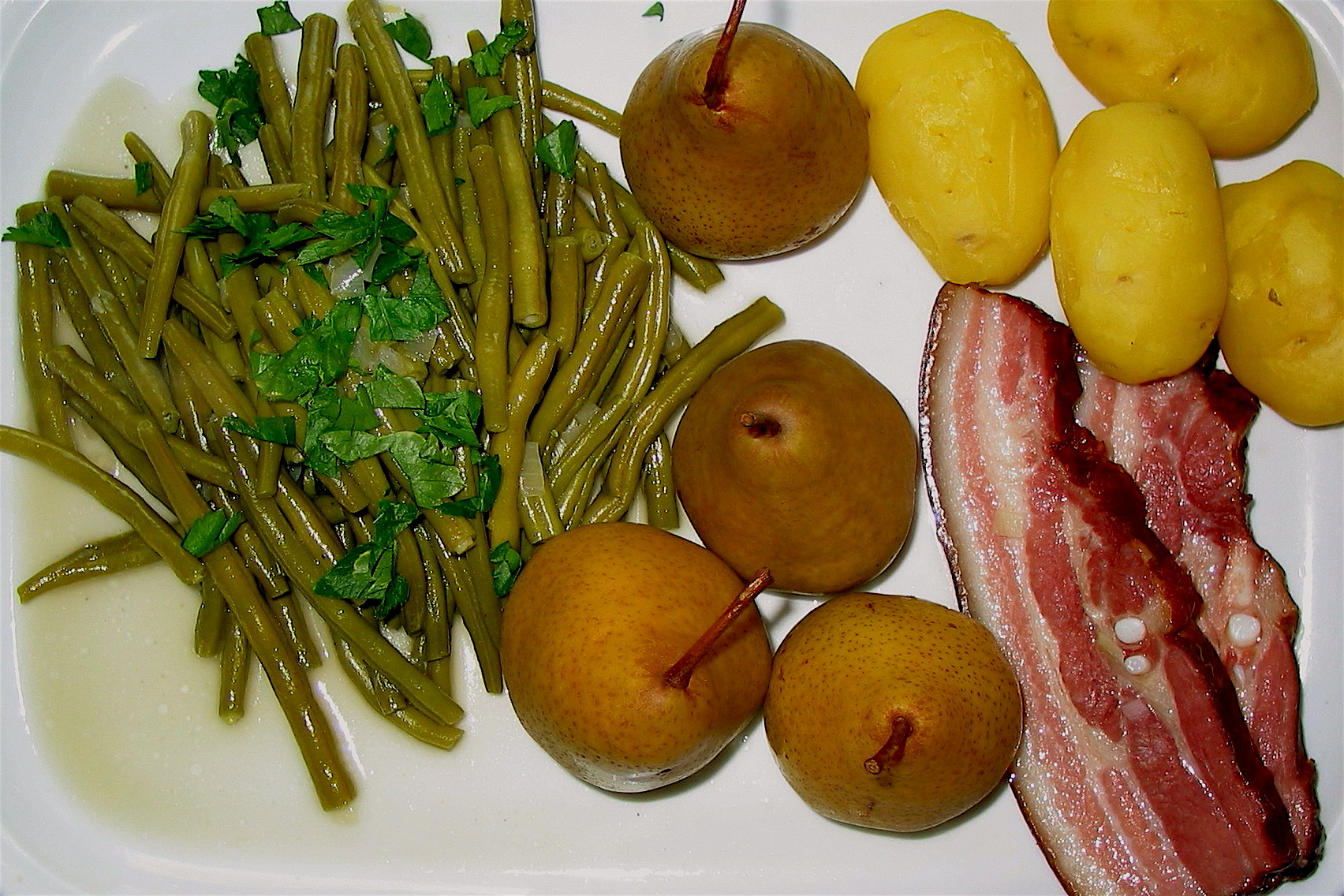
Sweet and tangy ingredients make the typical "broken sööt" taste of the cuisine of Schleswig-Holstein

== Taste characteristics ==
One of the preferences of this regional cuisine is to combine the sweetness of a dish with a taste contrast like sour or salty. These combinations are also described as "Broken sööt" which means "broken sweetness" in English and is especially present in dishes which are "söötsuur" (sweet-sour).

Many typical dishes feature this "broken-sööt-taste" due to their preparation such as Holsteiner Sauerfleisch or Rübenmalheur. This impression mainly emerges from the association of tangy meat dishes with sweet side dishes such as in the famous stew Birnen, Bohnen und Speck. In this stew the sweetness of pears is combined with the hearty and rich bacon broth. In some dishes this taste combination is accomplished by stewing meat for a long time together with vegetables and is then being served e.g. with caramelized potatoes or some sugar to add and adjust sweetness after the cooking process.

Often the sweetness is also due to dried fruit such as plums or raisins which are not only used as a stuffing for poultry but can also be served as a side dish to grilled meats or fish or being featured in chicken or beef broth.

== Beverages ==
Apart from the common drinks, the cuisine of Schleswig-Holstein features many liqueurs and liquors, such as Korn and Akvavit, which are popular to be drunk together with beer. This combination is also called "Lütt un Lütt" which literally means "small and small". The most famous beer brands have their origin in the federal state of Schleswig-Holstein and are Flensburger Pilsener and Dithmarscher Pilsener.

Hot drink specialities are particularly Tote Tante, "dead aunt", Pharisäer, "pharisee", a coffee drink with rum, and Punsch, a kind of glögg.
