= Braadworst =

Large Dutch sausage composed of pork

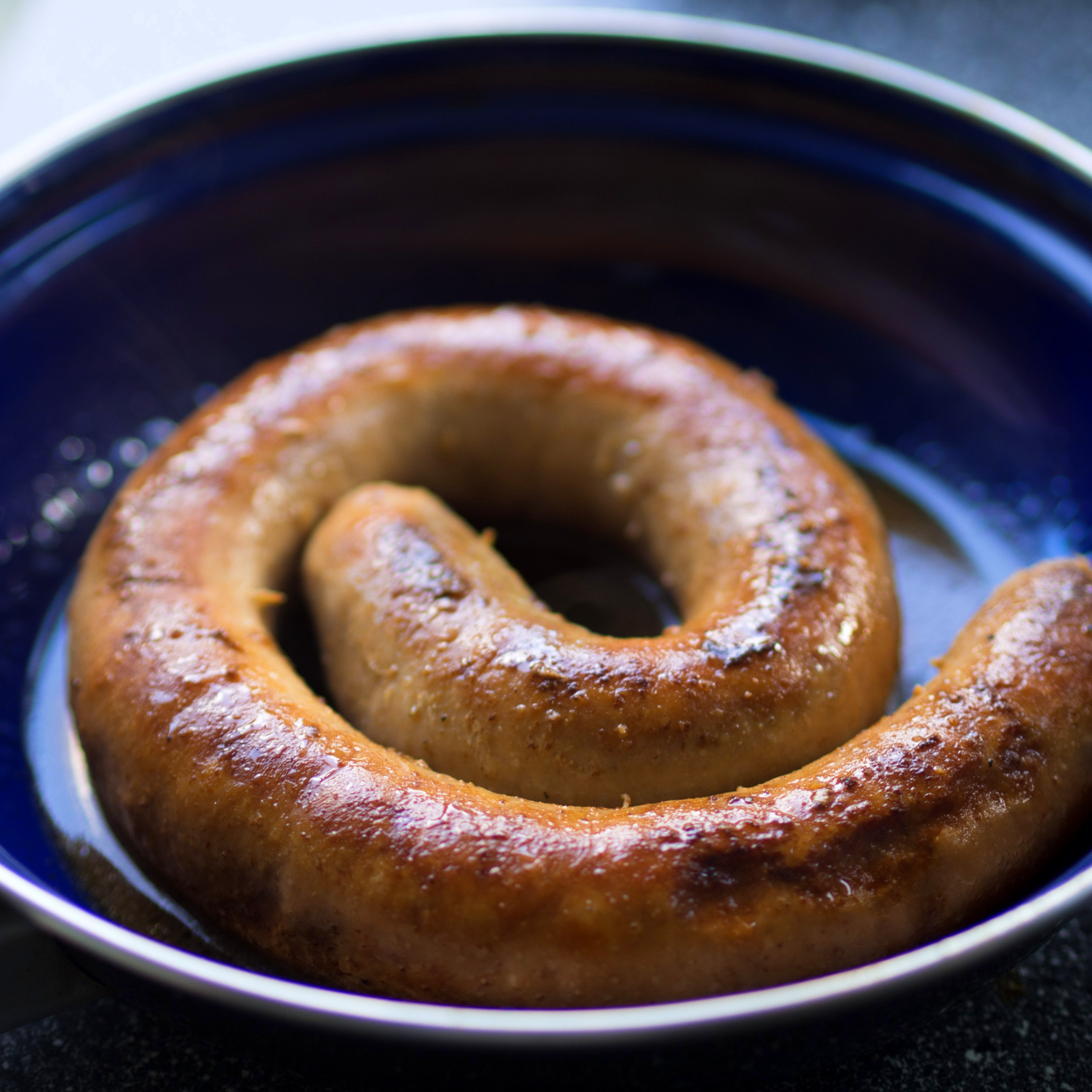
Braadworst in an enamel pan

A braadworst (Dutch pronunciation: [ˈbraːtʋɔrst]) or verse worst is a large Dutch sausage, most often composed of pork for its meat to fat ratio, although beef or veal can be used too. The meat is spiced with pepper and nutmeg, but other spices and herbs such as cloves, sage, fennel seed, coriander seed, or juniper berries can be used in addition. Along with rookworst it is the most common sausage served along most varieties of stamppot but is eaten with other dishes as well and can be found throughout the Netherlands and Flanders.

The name braadworst is Dutch for roast sausage, whereas verse worst simply means fresh sausage (as opposed to dried or cured sausages).

Typically the sausage is pan fried with a large complement of butter, though during the summertime it is not uncommon to see the sausage on a barbecue.

In the Dutch language the name braadworst is occasionally used for the German Bratwurst as well, though the sausages involved are very different. Bratwursts are also referred to by their native name or are called Duitse braadworst which means German braadworst.

The Dutch verse worst or braadworst is the direct ancestor of the internationally more known Afrikaner boerewors, to which it still bears great resemblance.

== See also ==
- List of sausages
