= Kohlwurst =

German smoked sausage

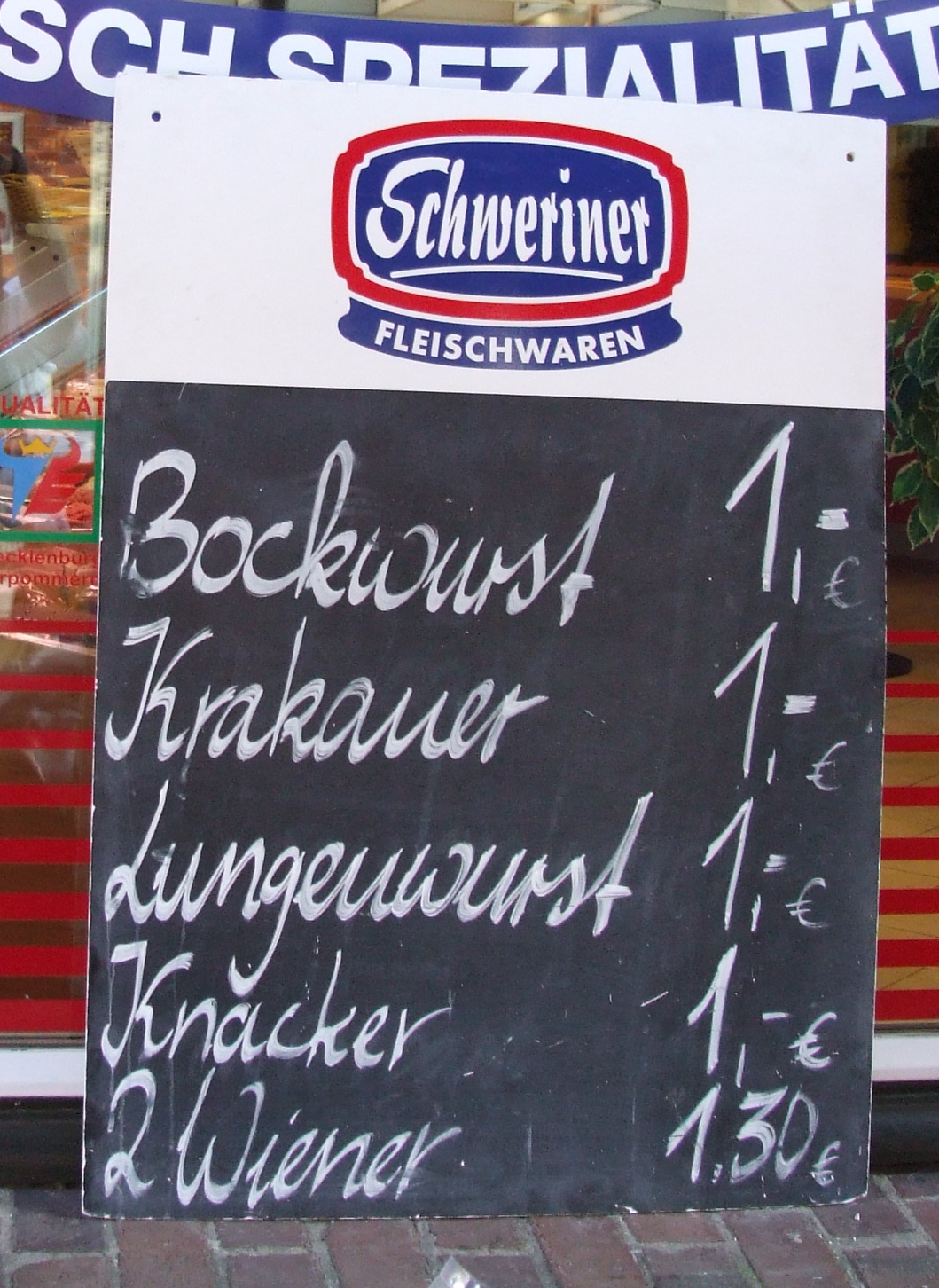
Lungenwurst in a butcher's offer in Schwerin

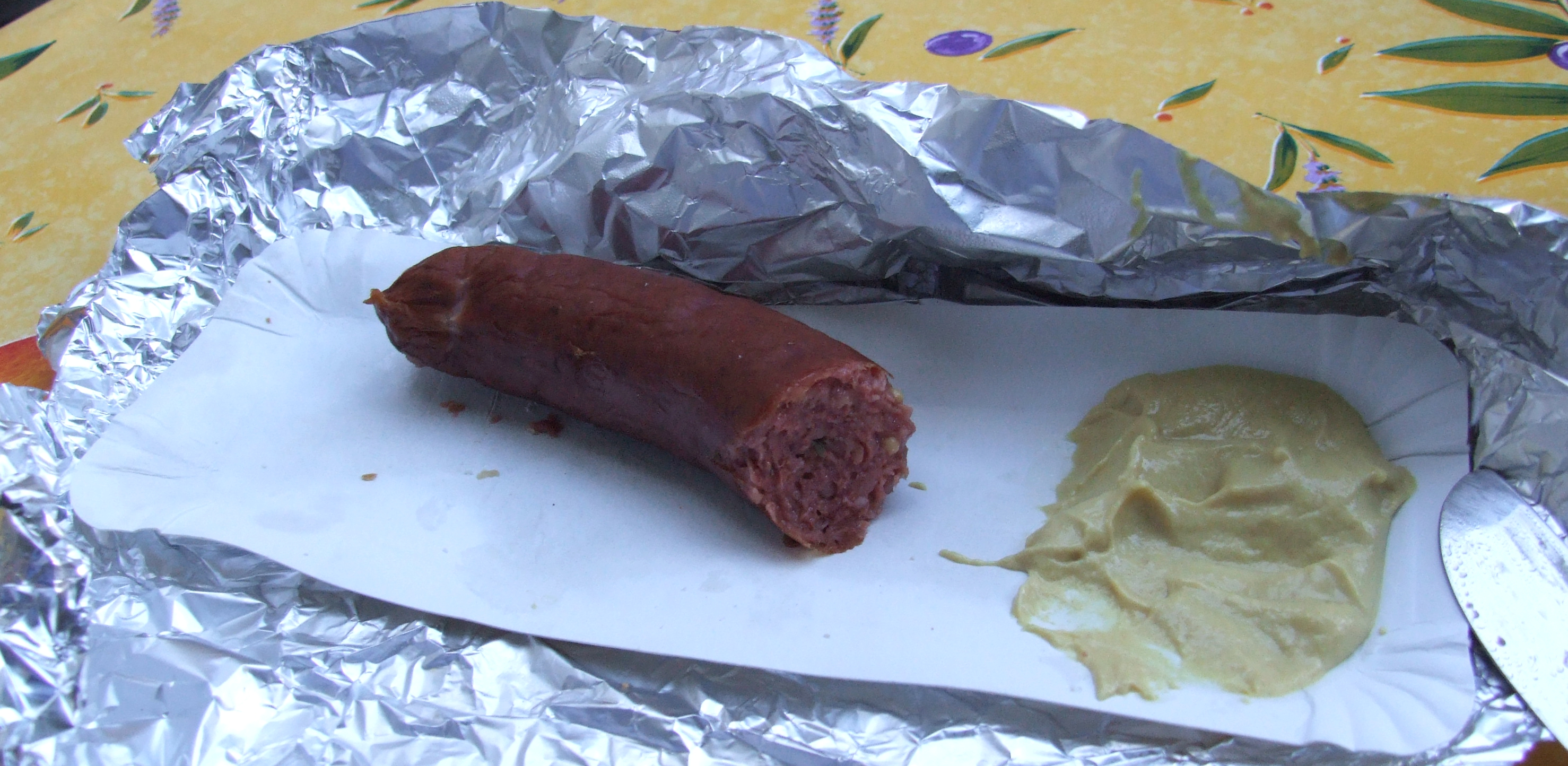
Lungenwurst from Schwerin

Kohlwurst, Lungenwurst or Lungwurst is a simple, fresh, strongly smoked sausage (Rohwurst) made of lights (lungs), pork and fat, which is mostly eaten cooked with kale (cabbage) dishes, such as Knieperkohl. (The word "Kohl" in German refers not only to kale, but to vegetables in the cabbage family; the sausage does not contain these vegetables but they are commonly served with it.)

It is mainly used in Northeast and Northwest German and Silesian cuisine, as well as in southwestern parts of Denmark, where it is called "kålpølse" (kale sausage).

Comparable sausage types are Bregenwurst and Pinkel.

== Preparation ==
To make Kohlwurst, pork (often the remains of the carcass) and fat are minced; then a similar amount of raw, cleaned lights is also minced. It is then all mixed together and, depending on the specific recipe, seasoned with onions, salt, pepper, marjoram, thyme, mustard seeds and allspice. Finally the sausage meat is loosely filled in casings of natural intestine and smoked for one to two weeks.

Kohlwurst is not fried or boiled, but is gently poached with cooked vegetables.

== See also ==
- List of smoked foods
