= Stamppot =

Dutch potato dish

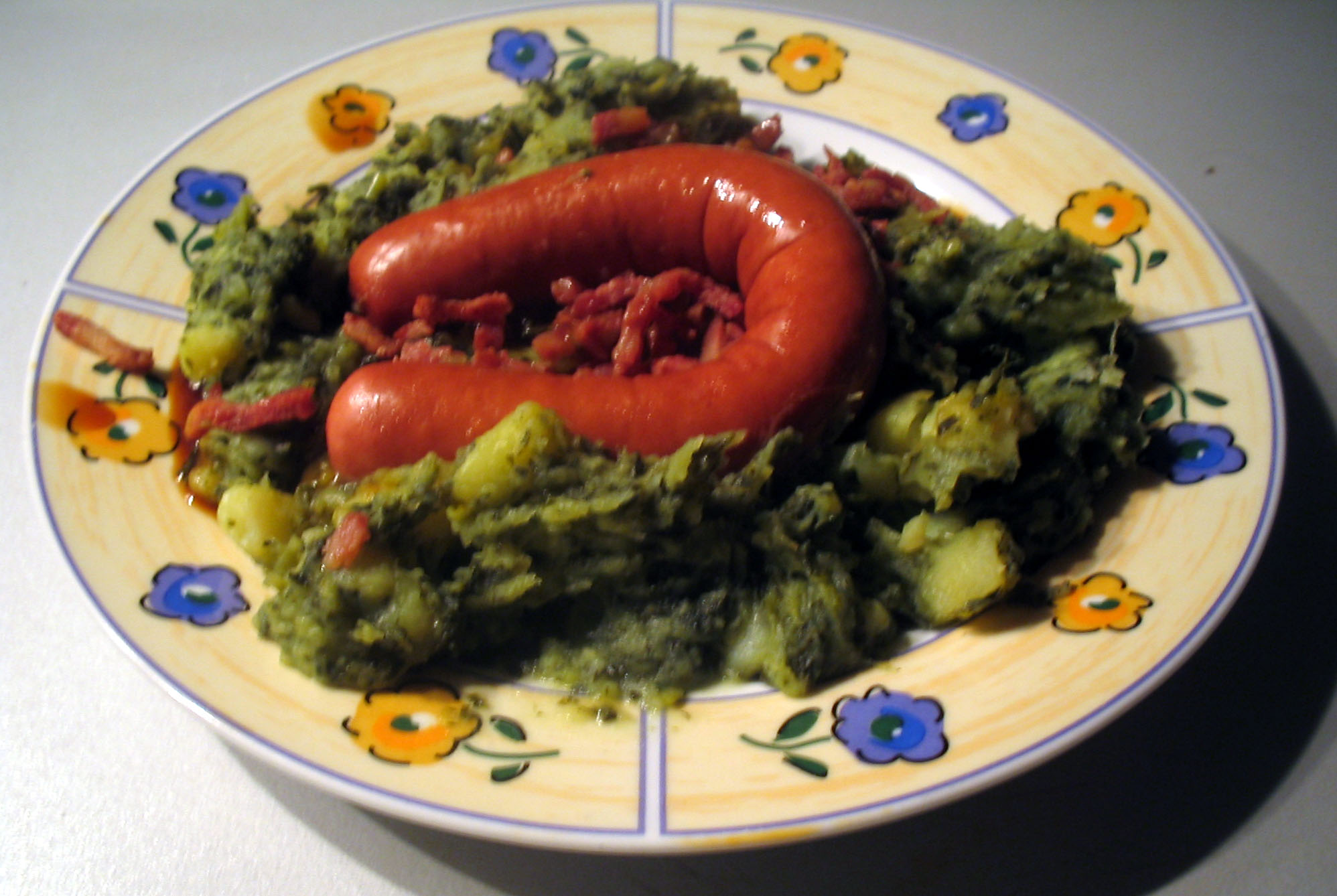
- A boerenkool (curly kale) stamppot served with traditional rookworst (smoked sausage)
- Type: Side dish or main course
- Place of origin: Netherlands
- Main ingredients: Potatoes, various vegetables and/or fruit
- Variations: Hutspot, wortelstoemp

Stamppot (Dutch: [ˈstɑmpɔt]; lit. 'mash pot') is a traditional Dutch dish made from a combination of smashed potatoes with one or several vegetables and typically garnished with sausages.

== History and description ==
These vegetable pairings traditionally include sauerkraut, endive, spinach, kale, turnip greens, or carrot and onion (the combination of the latter two is known as hutspot in the Netherlands and as wortelstoemp in Belgium). Leafy greens, such as endive, may be left raw and added to the potatoes only at the mashing stage. Some less common regional varieties of stamppot are made with fruit and potatoes, such as blauwe bliksem 'blue lightning', made with pears, and hete bliksem 'hot lightning', made with sweet apples. Pineapple may also be included in sauerkraut or endive stamppot. In recent years, variations on the traditional stamppot have become more popular with ingredients such as rocket, leeks, beets, sweet potato, or mushrooms. Sometimes, fish is used as an ingredient in stamppot as well. Stamppot is primarily a cold-weather dish.

Stamppot is usually served with sausage (in the Netherlands often smoked, in Belgium more often fried), julienned bacon, or stewed meat. Other accompaniments include cheese, gherkins, mustard, and pickled onions.

Prepared stamppot can be purchased from shops and supermarkets. It can also be ordered in cafe-style restaurants, but recent, stricter regulations on allowed foods in taverns versus restaurants have limited the custom of offering simple dishes in many Belgian pubs.

The origin of stamppot is unknown, although legend attributes the invention of hutspot to the 1574 Siege of Leiden. Using raw leafy vegetables instead of cooking them with the potatoes has not been dated to earlier than 1940.

== Preparation ==
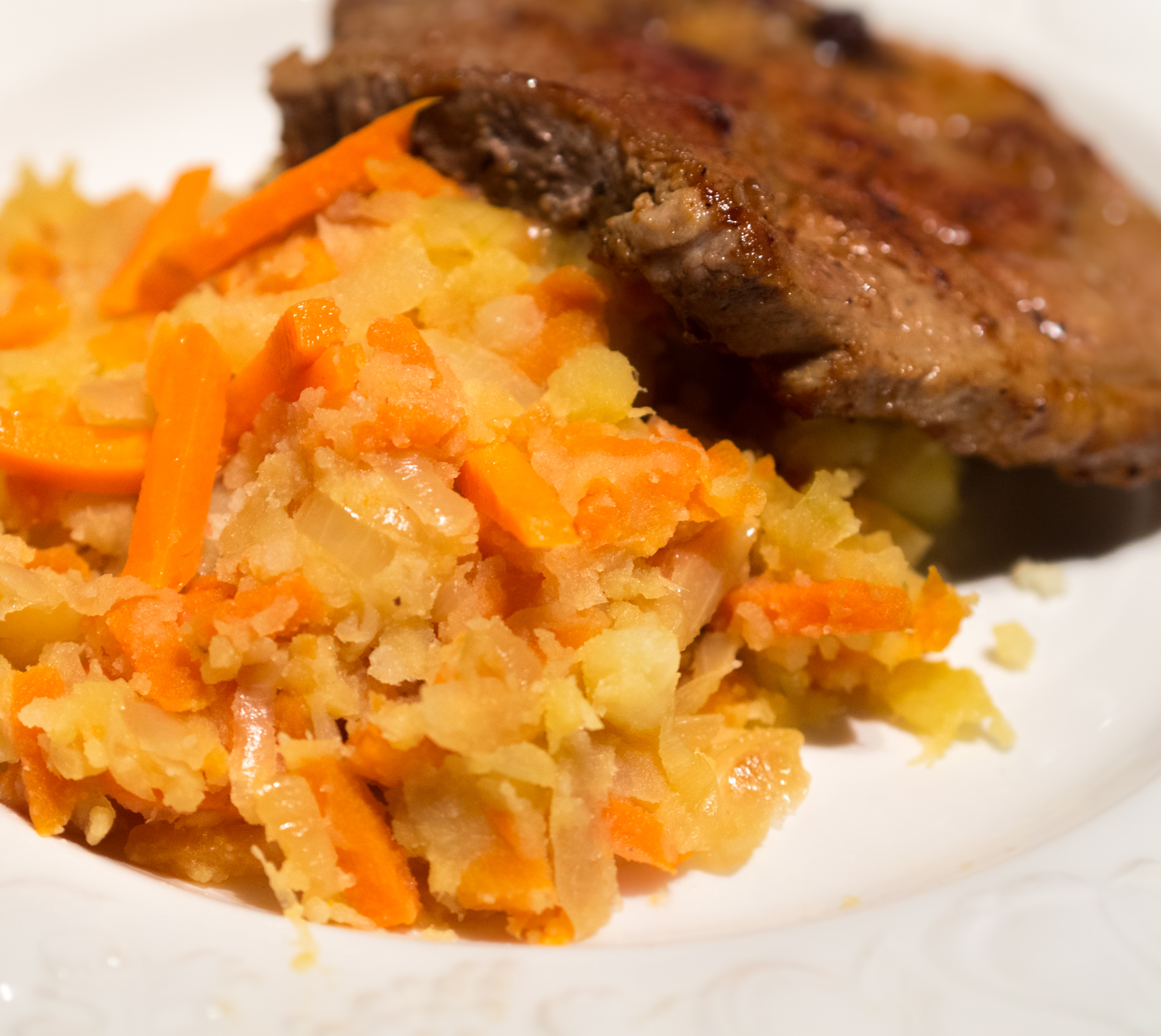
Hutspot served with a pork chop

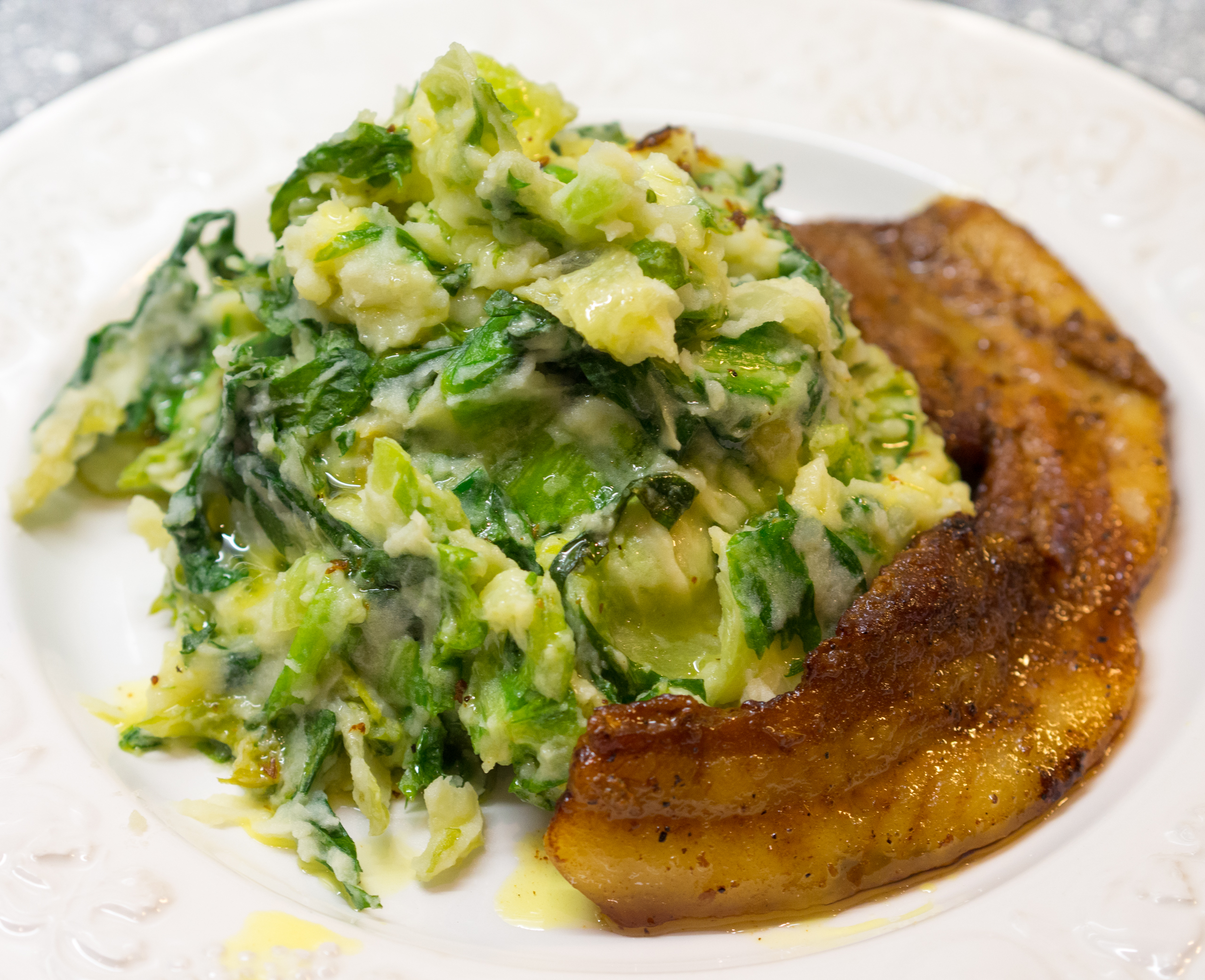
An andijviestamppot (endive mashed with potatoes) served with a slice of butter-fried pork belly and butter gravy

There are two methods of preparing stamppot, the first being the more modern form:

1. Stamppot is prepared by boiling the vegetables and potatoes separately. Once done, the potatoes are added to the same pot as the vegetables and all are thoroughly mashed together. Rookworst, a type of smoked sausage, is the preferred piece of meat to be added to the dish in the Netherlands.
2. Stamppot can also be made in a single pot. Potatoes and the vegetables or fruit of choice are placed in the pot. Water is added, and the mixture is left to boil. After the vegetables are cooked and drained, some milk, butter and salt are added, and the vegetables are mashed together. Sometimes the same pot is used to warm sausage as well, but those are not mashed in. An example often cooked by this method is hutspot with carrots and onions as vegetables.

Lardons (spekjes) are often added for flavoring. It is also common to make a small hole in the top of the mix on the plate and fill it with gravy, known in Dutch as a kuiltje jus 'little gravy pit'.

== Similar dishes ==
- Bubble and squeak, from England
- Champ and colcannon, from Ireland
- Rumbledethumps, from Scotland
- Stoemp, from Belgium
- Trinxat, from the Empordà region of Catalonia, northeast Spain, and Andorra
