= Bregenwurst =

Type of German sausage

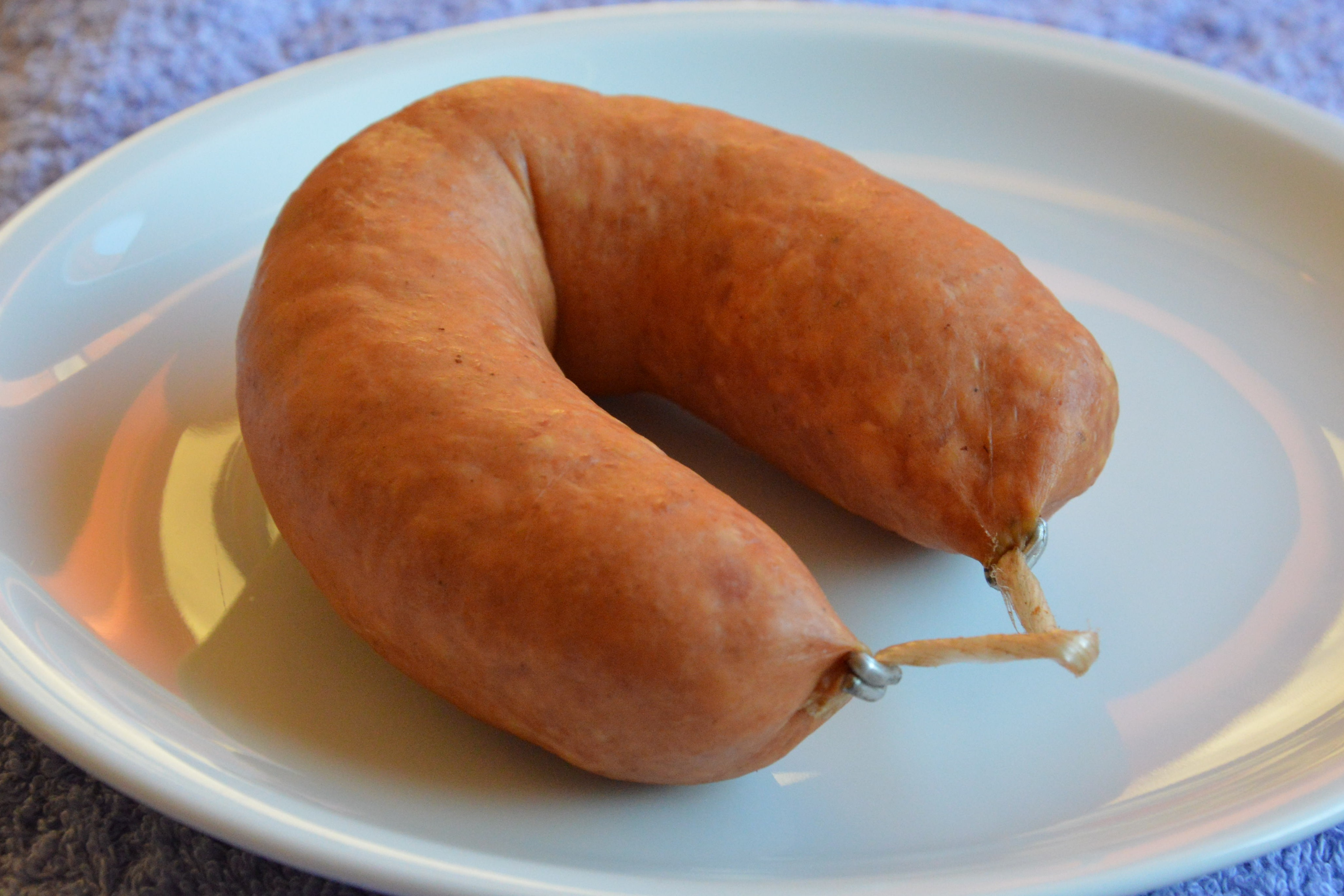
Bregenwurst

Bregenwurst (also Brägenwurst) is a German sausage variety commonly served in parts of Lower Saxony and Saxony-Anhalt.

It is traditionally made of pork, pork belly, and pig or cattle brain, however animal brains have been forbidden in foodstuffs within the European Union since 2001, as a consequence of BSE outbreaks.

The sausage is eaten raw or stewed, which gives it a spreadable consistency once broken from its casing. In winter it is also served with Grünkohl (kale).

The name Bregenwurst comes from the Low German word Bregen (or Brägen) meaning "brain" .
