= Rookworst =

Type of Dutch sausage

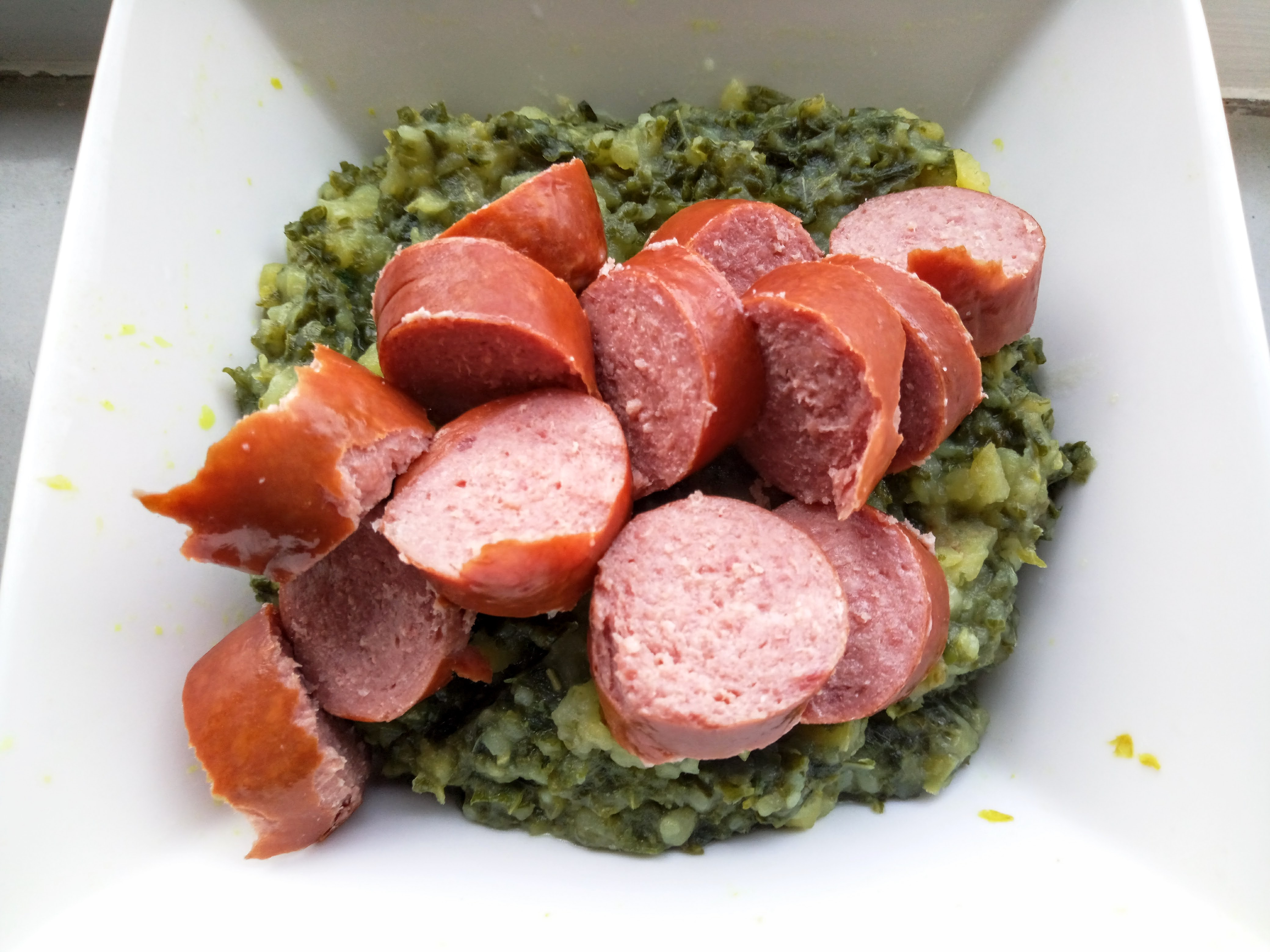
- Rookworst with stamppot of kale (boerenkool)
- Place of origin: Netherlands
- Region or state: Northwestern Europe
- Serving temperature: warm
- Main ingredients: Pork and spices

Rookworst (Dutch pronunciation: [ˈroːkʋɔrst]; smoked sausage) or Gelderse rookworst is a type of Dutch sausage in which ground meat is mixed with spices and salt and stuffed into a casing. Having the shape of a ring bologna, it is common in the Netherlands and is also exported to Great Britain. The basis for Gelderse rookworst is metworst, or lean pork. Traditionally, rookworst is made with pork, stuffed in a small pig intestine and smoked over smouldering chips of oak and beechwood. This traditional rookworst is usually sold in butcher shops.

It is assumed that rookworst from the province of Gelderland started to make waves in the Netherlands in the eighteenth century. The cookbook De Volmaakte Gelderse Keuken-Meid (1756) gives detailed instructions on how to use oak or beech wood to smoke sausage in the chimney or smoking room. Gelderland, the only province that had ample access to such wood, became most famous for its smoked sausage. Around 1900, almost every farmer smoked his own slaughter in the chimney. There were also many pig farms in the province at the time.

Originally, rookworst was made in November, because that was the slaughter month; coincidentally, November was also the harvest month of kale, so the two were often eaten together. This perennially served dish is a traditional ingredient in the stamppot and remains extremely well-known. It is nowadays also eaten as a snack with mustard. Every year, the best rookworst of the Netherlands is selected during a contest held in the city of Arnhem in Gelderland.

Most rookworst sold in supermarkets is mass-produced in factories and is not smoked, but has smoke aromatics added to give the characteristic flavour. Glucono-delta-lactone is added to lower the pH and add to shelf life, and the intestine is replaced by bovine collagen. Unox is a major producer of rookworst.

In recent years, beef- and chicken-based rookworst is also available in most Dutch supermarkets.

There are two types of rookworst:

1. The most common form of rookworst is a cooked sausage, sold in a vacuum pack. As this sausage leaves the factory already cooked, it is shelf-stable for weeks, and only needs to be reheated.
2. Raw rookworst—also known as crafted, old-fashioned or butchers' rookworst—contains raw meats, and has to be prepared properly. Often this type of rookworst still uses natural intestine for the casing instead of bovine collagen. As the meat is raw, this type must be cooked before it can be safely eaten. A common method is to simmer the rookworst.

A recipe from a Dutch cookbook of 1940 gives the proportions of ground meat as four parts of pork to three parts of veal and three parts of bacon. The mixture is salted and saltpeter, sugar and nutmeg are added before the meat is forced into pig intestines. The sausages are air-dried at 12 to 15 degrees C and then smoked at 18 to 20 degrees C.

Rookworst is consumed extremely often in the Netherlands. Every year—especially in and around winter—the Dutch eat about 50 to 60 million smoked sausages. The Dutch supermarket chain HEMA sells as many as 10 million rookworst per year.

== See also ==
- List of smoked foods
