= Pinkel =

Type of German sausage

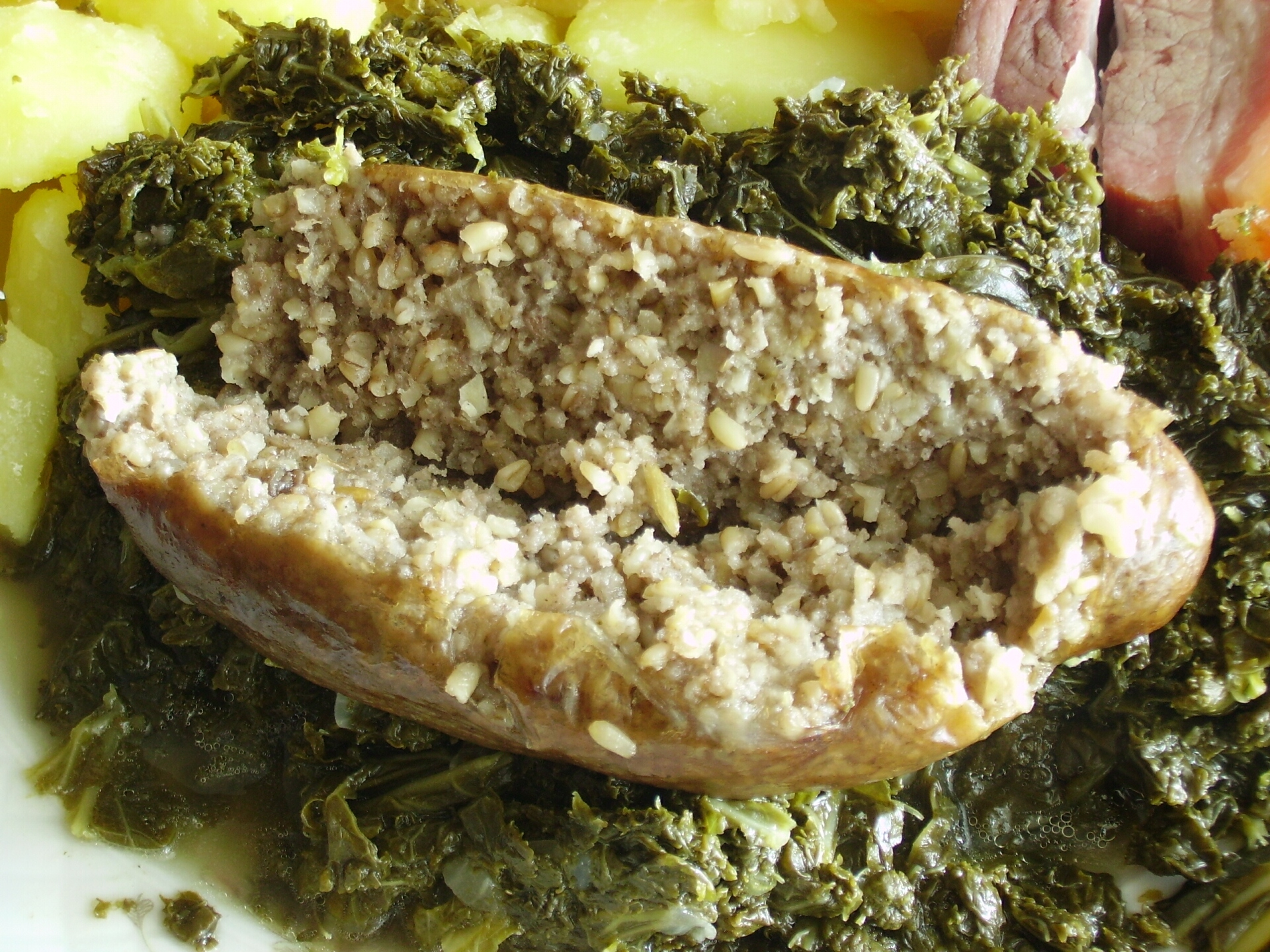
Sliced pinkel

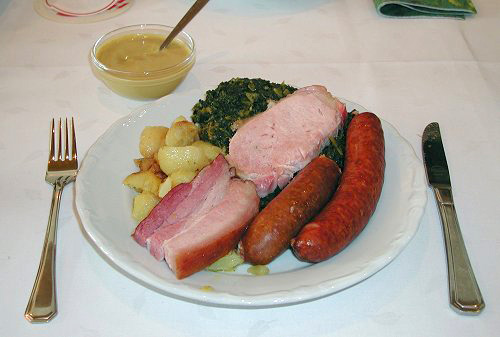
Grünkohl with (sweet) roast potatoes, Pinkel, Kochwurst, Kassler, and bacon

Pinkel is a smoked Kaszanka (German: Grützwurst), which is a type of sausage. It is eaten mainly in northwest Germany, especially the region around Oldenburg, Bremen and Osnabrück as well as in East Frisia and Friesland.

== Etymology ==
The word pinkel is East Frisian. The sausage name is thought to derive from pinkelt, meaning "little finger". Alternatively, the name could refer to the homonymous verb which means "to drip", referring to the manner in which fat drips from the sausage during smoking.

== Ingredients and uses ==
Pinkel consists mainly of bacon, groats of oats or barley, beef suet, pig lard, onions, salt, pepper and other spices. The exact composition of the recipe is guarded by butchers as a trade secret and therefore varies from village to village. Pinkel with a high meat content is also described as Fleisch-Pinkel ("meat pinkel") or Oldenburger Pinkel. Pinkel is traditionally filled into the edible small intestines of pigs, although today edible artificial casings are also used.

Pinkel is often eaten with kale (Grünkohl) as the dish Grünkohl mit Pinkel ("kale and pinkel"), which is a kale stew with pork belly and other sausages added to it. According to tradition, Germans would celebrate winter by taking Kohl-und-Pinkel-Touren ("kale and pinkel trips") or Grünkohlfahrt ("kale trips"), consisting of a hike followed by a meal of Grünkohl mit Pinkel and Schnaps.

== See also ==
- List of smoked foods
