= Clapshot =

Scottish potato and turnip dish

- Course: Side dish
- Place of origin: Scotland
- Region or state: Orkney
- Main ingredients: Potatoes, swede turnips, butter

Clapshot is a traditional Scottish dish that originated in Orkney and may be served with haggis, mince, sausages or cold meat. It is prepared by boiling swede turnips and potatoes ("neeps and tatties") together with a little salt, then draining and adding a good knob of butter salt and white pepper (some include onion, but this is no longer considered clapshot—onion can be fried and added on the side, but not in the main dish).

The name is Orcadian in origin. A possible etymology is the Orcadian dialect word klepp, a dollop of potato.

== See also ==
- List of potato dishes
- Scottish cuisine
