= Stovies =

Scottish potato stew

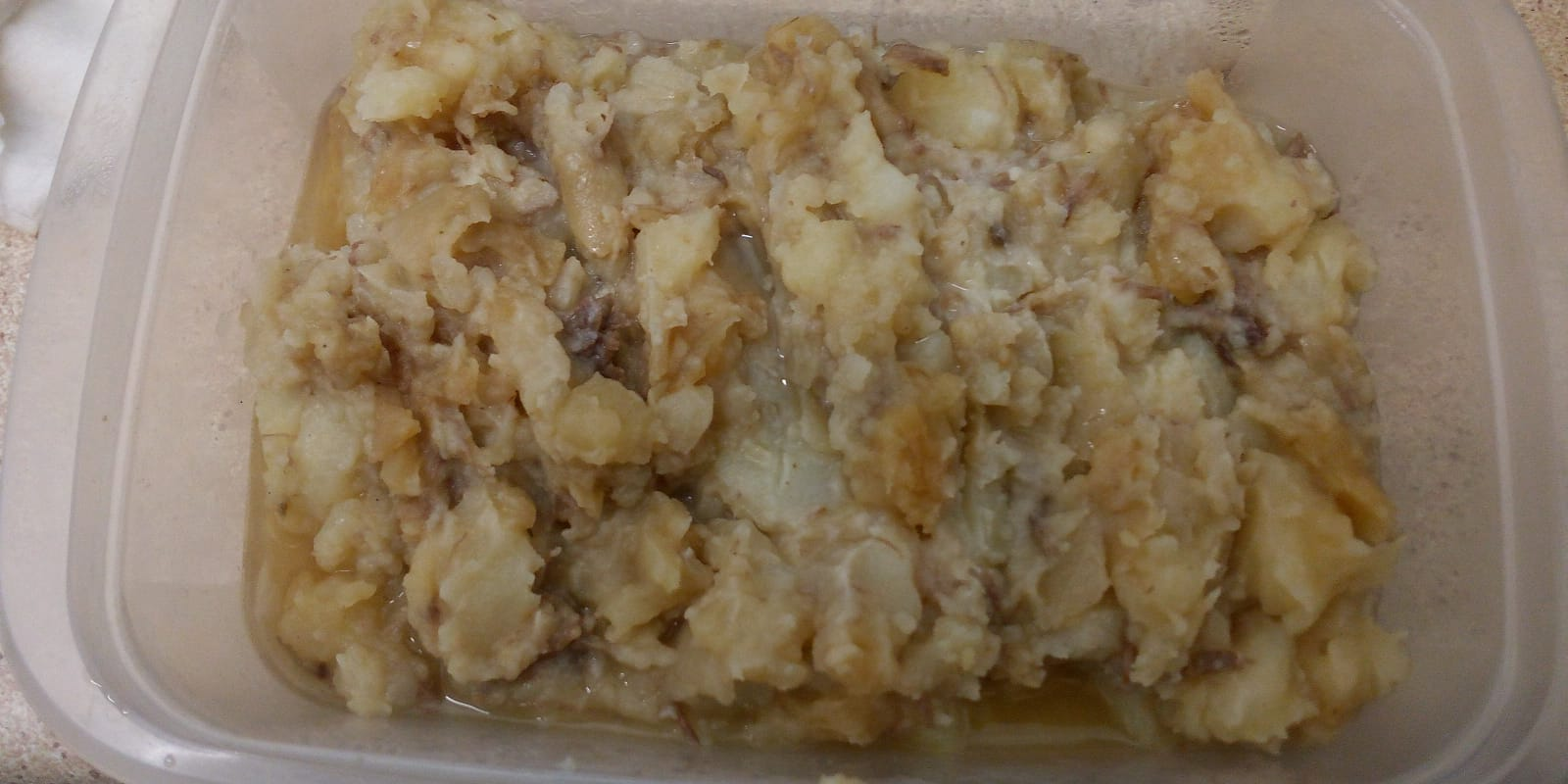
- Place of origin: Scotland
- Main ingredients: Potatoes, often onions, meat

Stovies (also stovy tatties, stoved potatoes, stovers or stovocks) is a Scottish stew based on potatoes. Recipes and ingredients vary widely but the dish contains potatoes, fat, usually onions and often pieces of meat. In some versions, other vegetables may be added.

The potatoes are cooked by slow stewing in a closed pot with fat (lard, beef dripping or butter) and often a small amount of water or other liquids, such as milk, stock or meat jelly. Stovies may be served accompanied by cold meat or oatcakes and, sometimes, pickled beetroot.

"To stove" means "to stew" in Scots. The term is from the French adjective étuvé which translates as braised. Versions without meat may be termed barfit and those with meat as high-heelers.

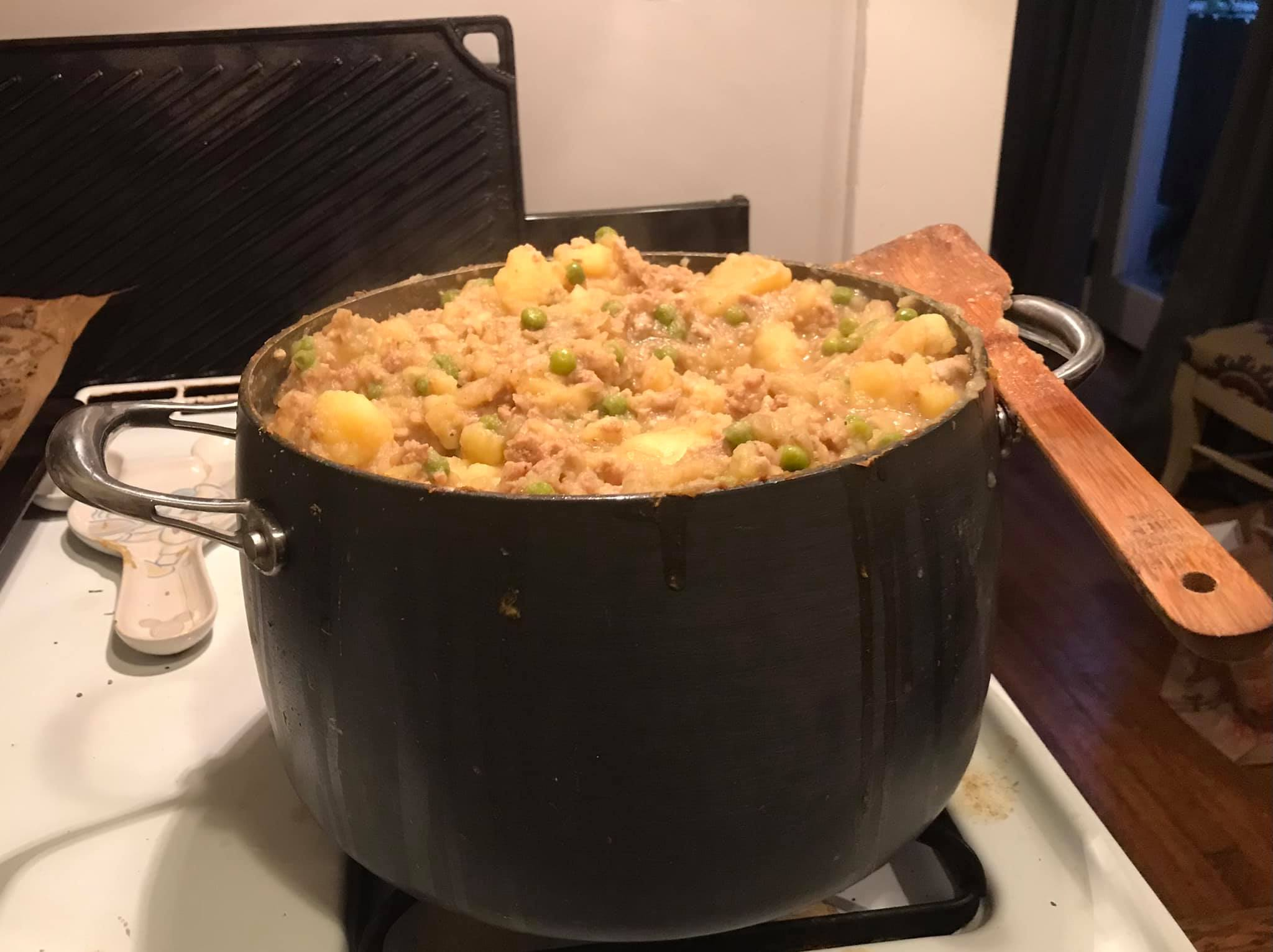
Home-made stovies, with the unusual addition of peas

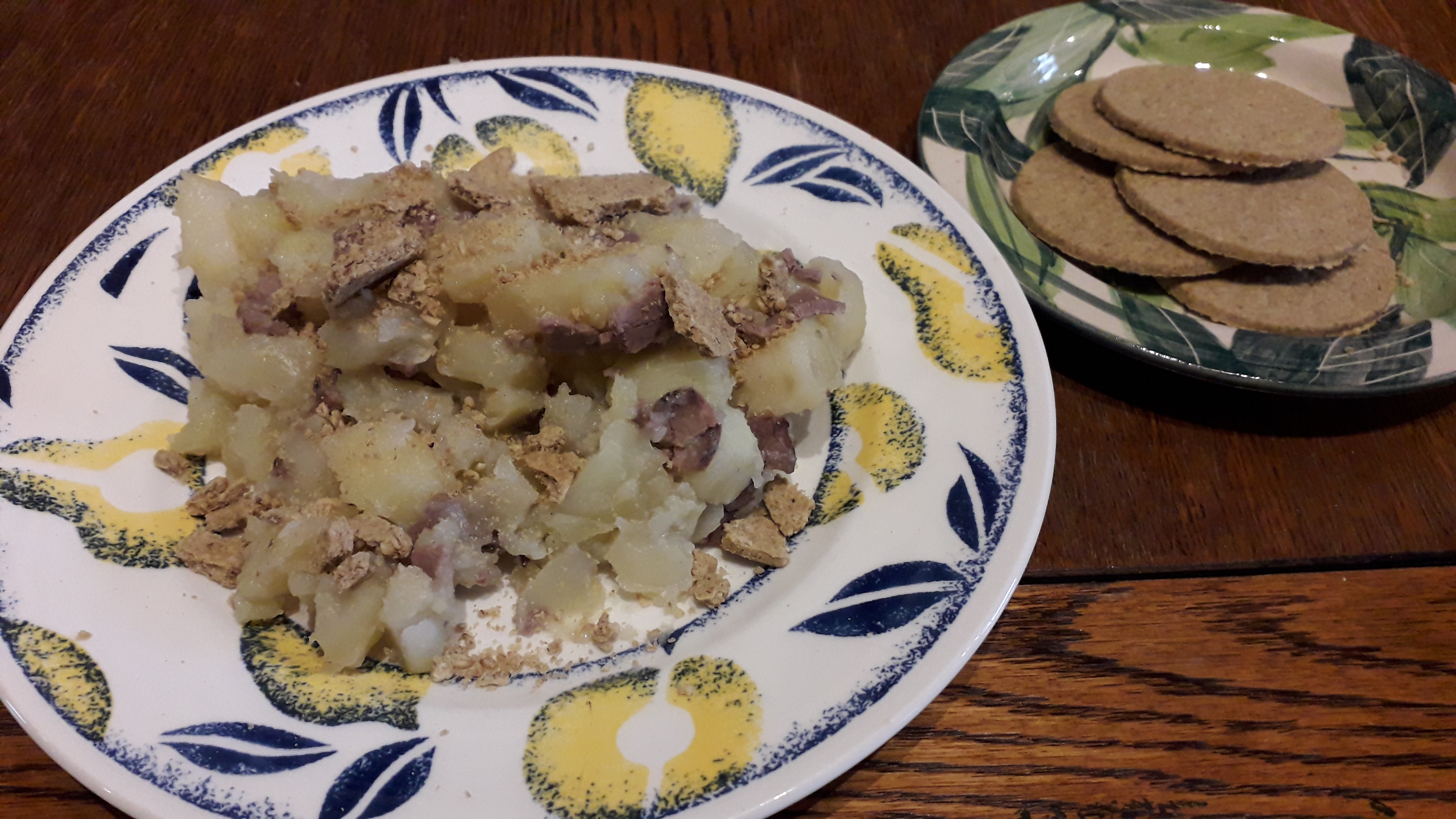
Stovies with beef leftovers and oatcakes

== See also ==
- List of potato dishes
- List of stews
