= Rumbledethumps =

Scottish potato and cabbage dish

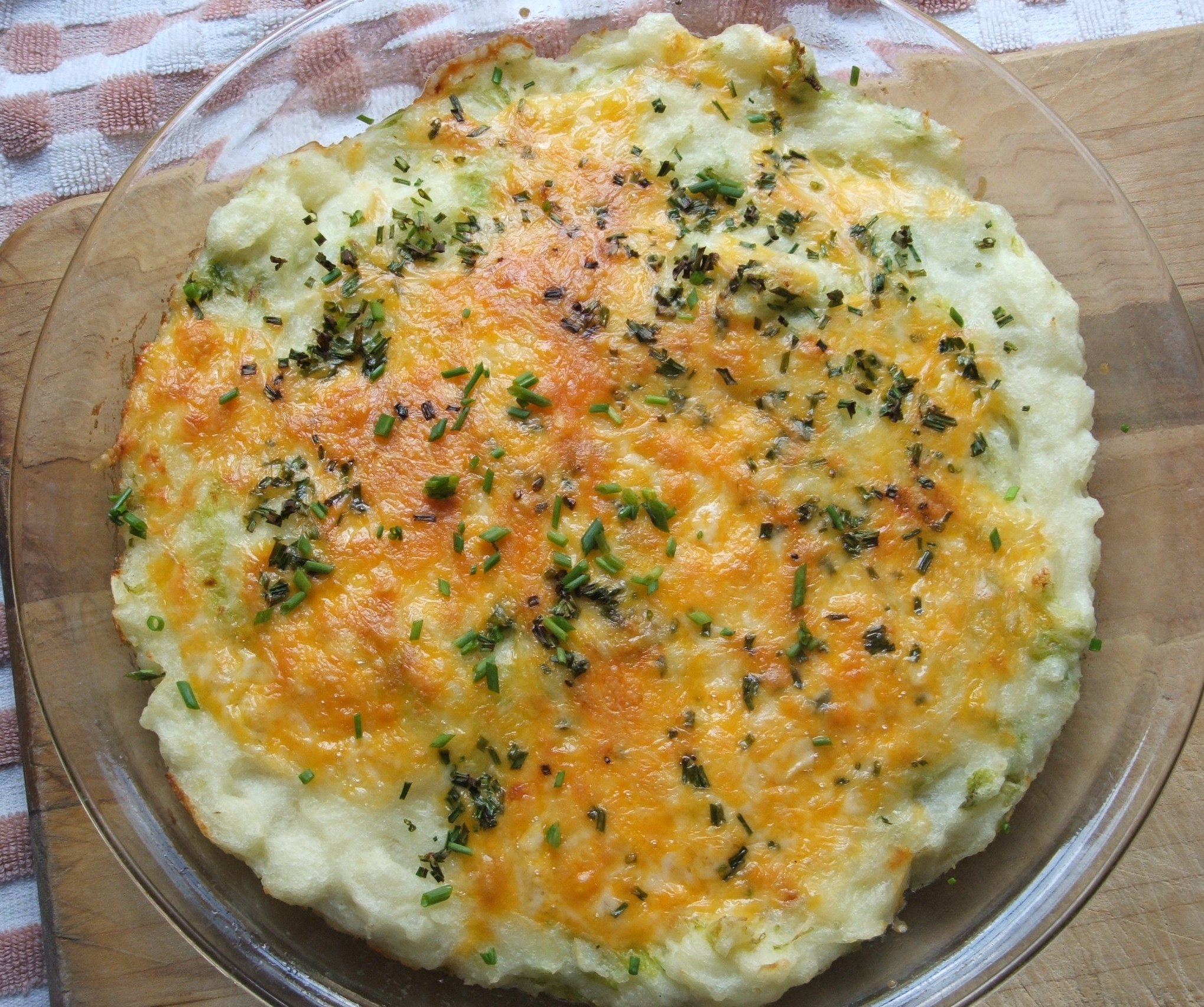
- A serving of rumbledethumps
- Place of origin: Scotland
- Region or state: Scottish Borders
- Main ingredients: Potatoes, cabbage, onions, cheese

Rumbledethumps is a traditional dish from the Scottish Borders. The main ingredients are potato, cabbage and onion. It is topped with cheese, usually cheddar. Similar to Irish colcannon and English bubble and squeak, it is either served as an accompaniment to a main dish or as a main dish itself.

Cooked leftovers from a roast meal can be used. An alternative from Aberdeenshire is called kailkenny.

== In popular culture ==
In January 2009, Gordon Brown submitted a recipe for rumbledethumps to a cookbook for Donaldson's School for the Deaf, describing it as his favourite food.

== See also ==
- Scottish cuisine
- List of cabbage dishes
- List of onion dishes
- List of potato dishes
