= Kale =

Form of cabbage with green or purple leaves

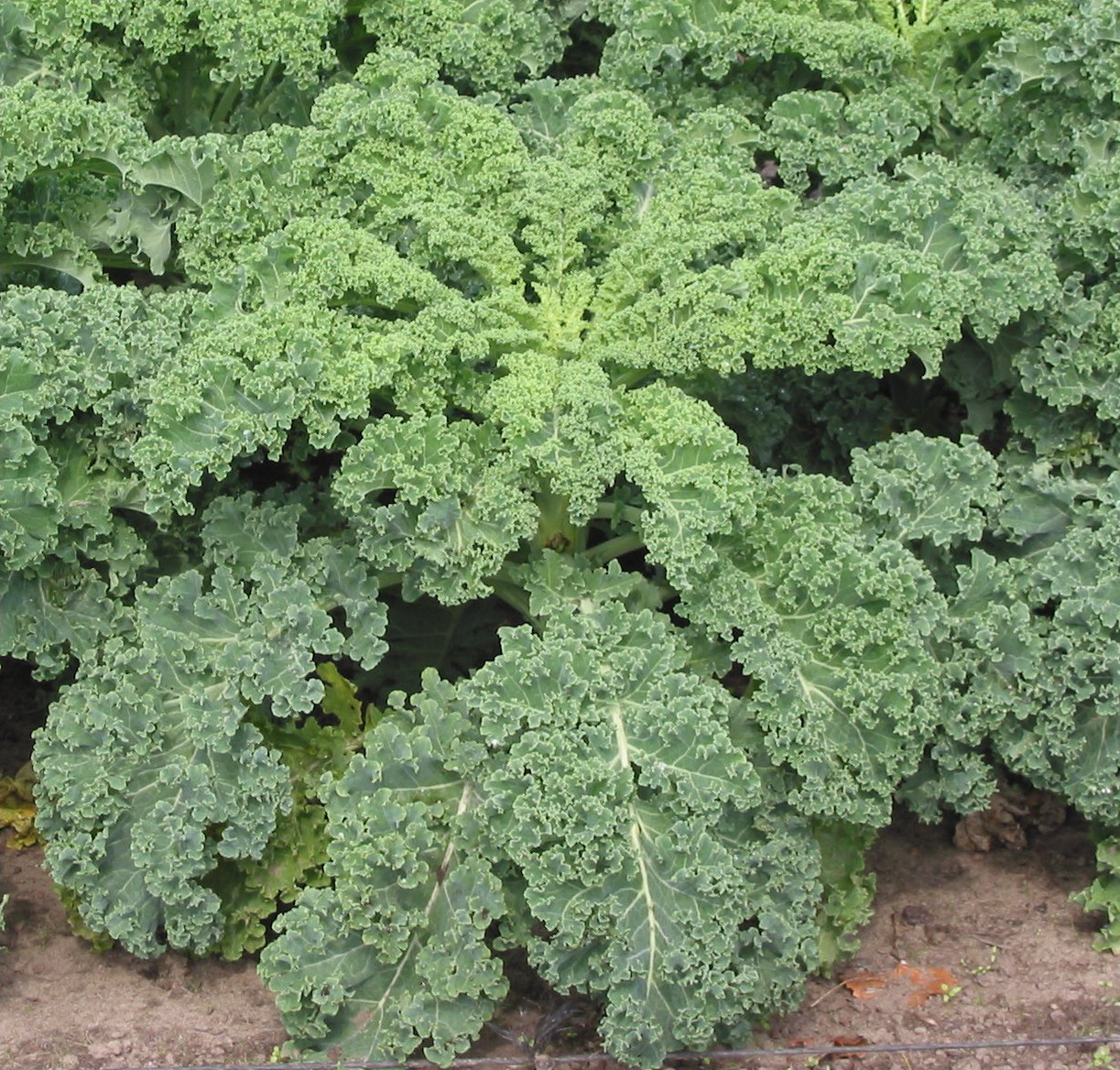
- Curly kale, one of the many varieties
- Species: Brassica oleracea
- Cultivar group: Acephala Group
- Origin: Unknown; before the Middle Ages
- Cultivar group members: Many; see text.

Kale (/keɪl/), also called leaf cabbage, belongs to a group of cabbage (Brassica oleracea) cultivars primarily grown for their edible leaves, but it is also used as an ornamental plant. Its multiple different cultivars vary quite a bit in appearance; the leaves can be bumpy, curly, or flat, and the color ranges from purple to green.

== Description ==
Kale plants have green or purple leaves, and the central leaves do not form a head, as with headed cabbage. The foliage and centers can be white, red, pink, lavender, yellow green or creamy white.

== Etymology ==
The name kale originates from Northern Middle English cale (compare Scots kail and German Kohl) for various cabbages. The ultimate origin is Latin caulis 'cabbage'.

== Cultivation ==
Derived from wild mustard, kale is considered to be closer to wild cabbage than most domesticated forms of B. oleracea.

Kale is usually a biennial plant grown from seed with a wide range of germination temperatures. It is hardy and thrives in wintertime, and can survive in temperatures as low as −15 °C (5 °F). Kale can become sweeter after a heavy frost.

=== History ===
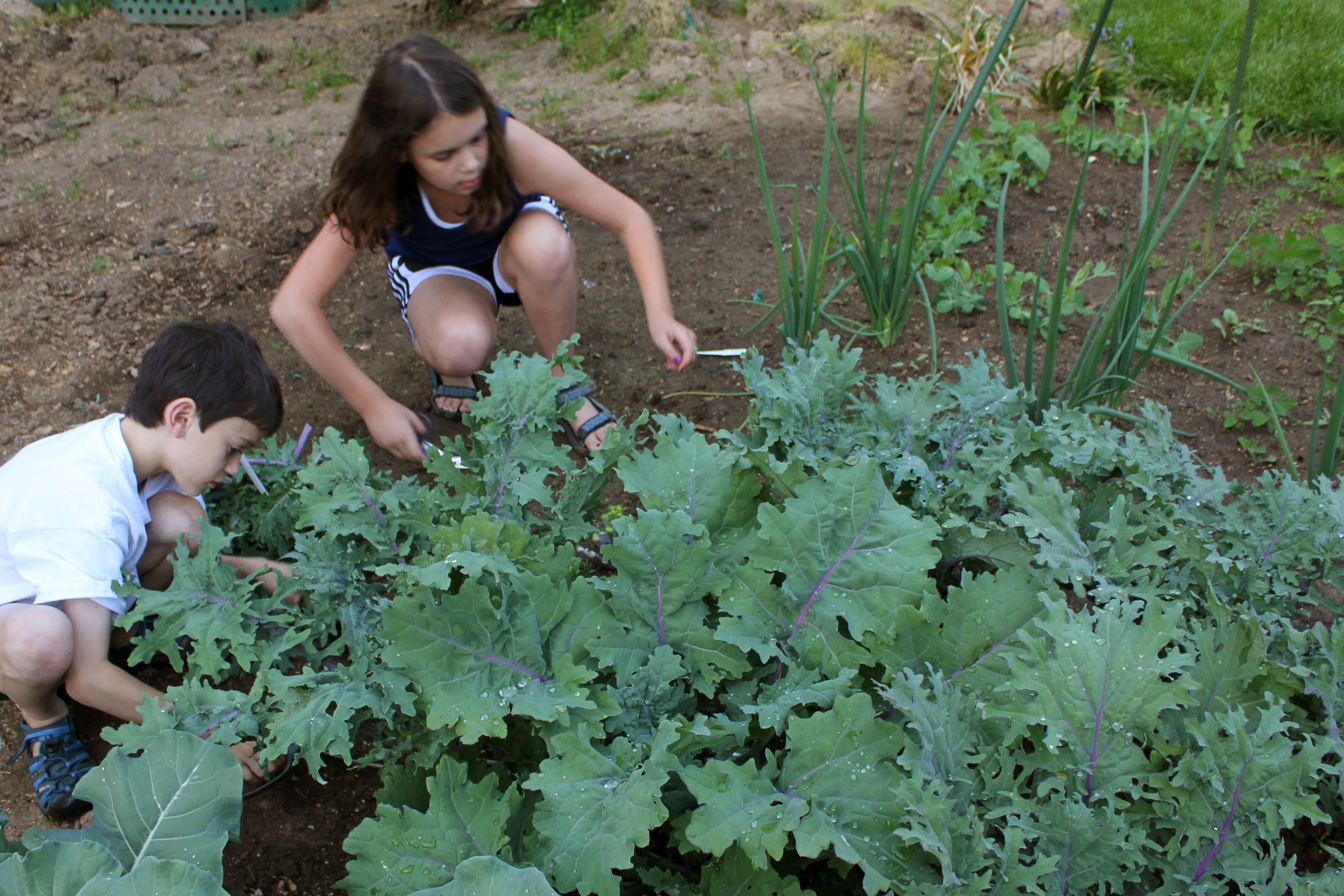
Children collecting leaves of red Russian kale (Brassica napus L. subsp. napus var. pabularia (DC.) Alef.) in a family vegetable garden

Kale originated in the eastern Mediterranean and Anatolia, where it was cultivated for food beginning by 2000 BCE at the latest. Curly-leaved varieties of cabbage already existed along with flat-leaved varieties in Greece in the 4th century BC. These forms, which were referred to by the Romans as Sabellian kale, are considered to be the ancestors of modern kales.

The earliest record of cabbages in western Europe is of hard-heading cabbage in the 13th century. Records in 14th-century England distinguish between hard-heading cabbage and loose-leaf kale.

Russian traders introduced Russian kale into Canada and then into the United States in the 19th century. USDA botanist David Fairchild is credited with introducing kale (and many other crops) to Americans, having brought it back from Croatia, although Fairchild himself disliked cabbages, including kale. At the time, kale was widely grown in Croatia mostly because it was easy to grow and inexpensive, and could desalinate soil.

=== Cultivars ===
Kale varieties can be differentiated according to the low, intermediate, or high length of the stem, and the variety of leaf types. Leaf colours range from light green to green, dark green, violet-green, and violet-brown.

Classification by leaf type:

- Curly-leaf (Scots kale, blue curled kale)
- Bumpy-leaf (black cabbage, better known by its Italian translation 'cavolo nero', and also known as Tuscan cabbage, Tuscan kale, lacinato and dinosaur kale)
- Sparkly-leaf (shiny and glossy)
- Plain-leaf (flat-leaf types like red Russian and white Russian kale)
- Leaf and spear, or feathery-type leaf (a cross between curly- and plain-leaf)
- Ornamental (less palatable and tougher leaves)

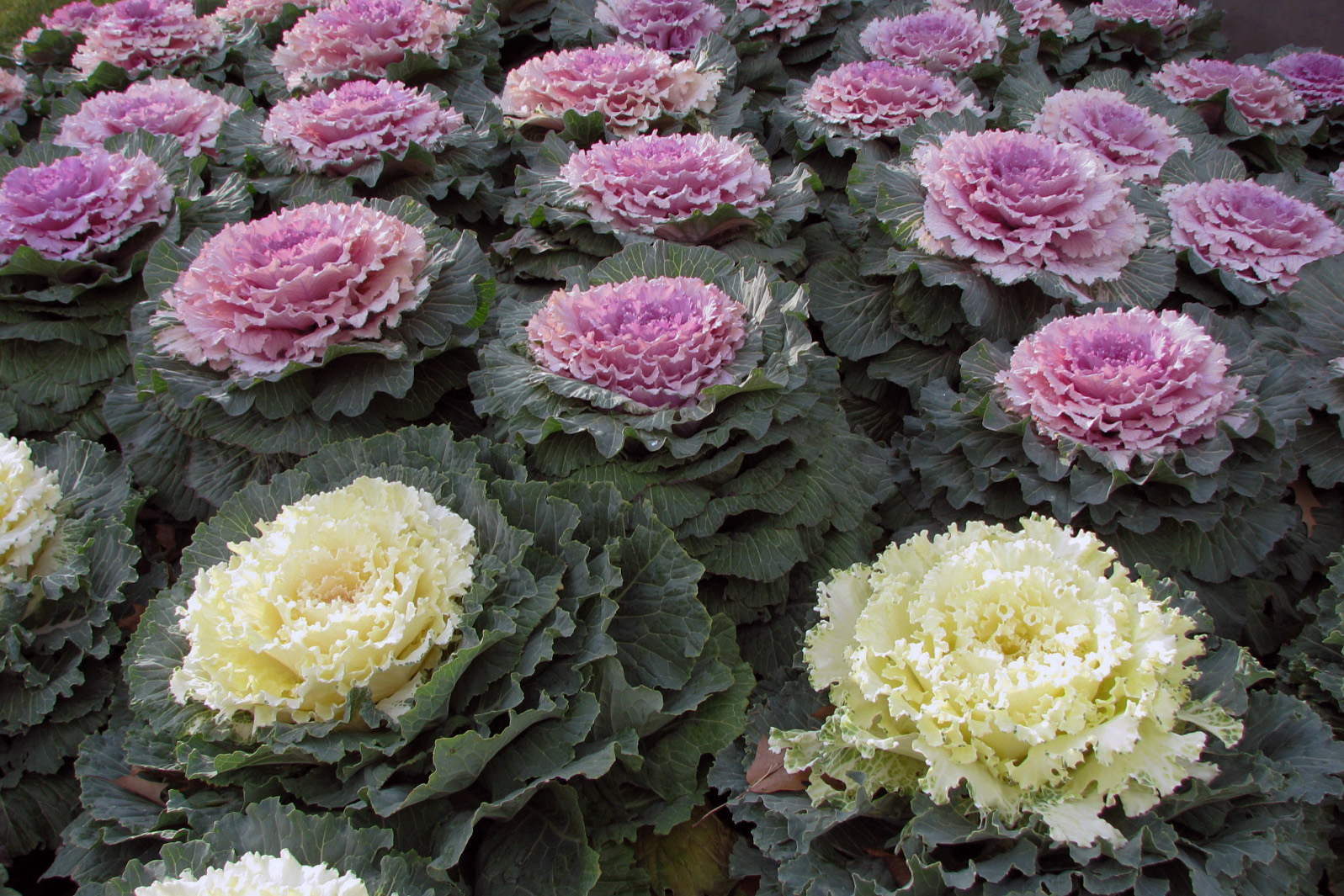
Ornamental kale in white and lavender

Because kale can grow well into winter, one variety of rape kale is called "hungry gap" after the period in winter in traditional agriculture when little else could be harvested. An extra-tall variety is known as Jersey kale or cow cabbage. Kai-lan or Chinese kale is a cultivar often used in Chinese cuisine. In Portugal, the bumpy-leaved kale is mostly called "couve galega" (Galician kale or Portuguese cabbage).

==== Ornamental kale ====
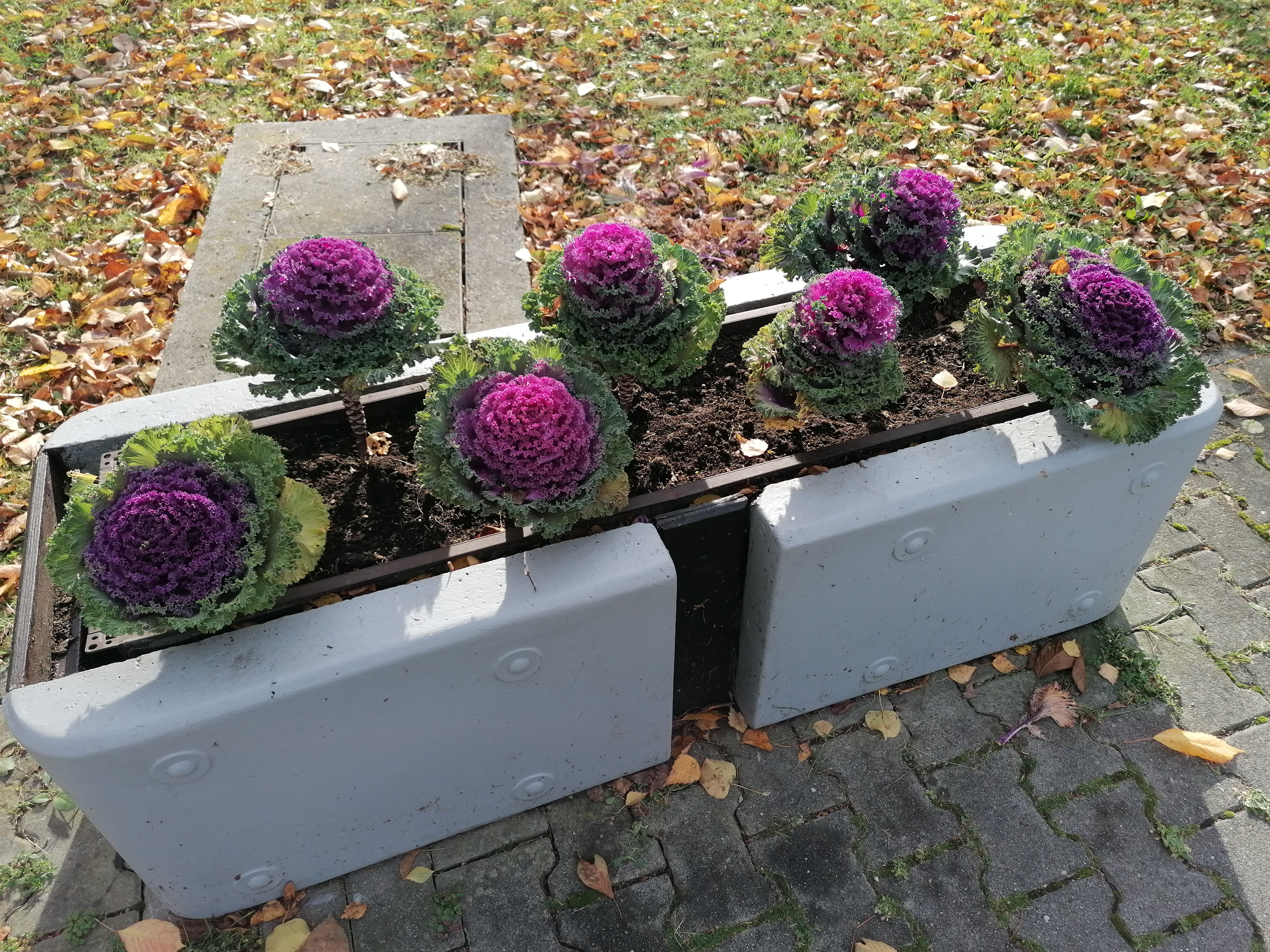
Ornamental kale displayed in Katowice, Poland

Many varieties of kale and cabbage are grown mainly for ornamental leaves that are brilliant white, red, pink, lavender, blue, or violet in the interior of the rosette. The different types of ornamental kale are peacock kale, coral prince, kamone coral queen, color up kale, and chidori kale. Ornamental kale is as edible as any other variety, but potentially not as palatable. In 2012, Pizza Hut purchased approximately 14,000 lbs of kale for use in salad bar decoration. Kale leaves are increasingly used as an ingredient for vegetable bouquets and wedding bouquets.

== Uses ==
=== Nutrition ===
Kale, raw
Nutritional value per 100 g (3.5 oz)
- Energy: 207 kJ (49 kcal)
- Carbohydrates: 8.8 g
- Sugars: 2.3 g
- Dietary fiber: 3.6 g
- Fat: 0.9 g
- Protein: 4.3 g
Vitamins and minerals
Vitamins	Quantity %DV^{†}
Vitamin A equiv. lutein zeaxanthin	27% 241 μg 6261 μg
Thiamine (B1)	9% 0.11 mg
Riboflavin (B2)	10% 0.13 mg
Niacin (B3)	6% 1.0 mg
Pantothenic acid (B5)	18% 0.9 mg
Vitamin B6	16% 0.27 mg
Folate (B9)	35% 141 μg
Choline	0% 0.8 mg
Vitamin C	133% 120 mg
Vitamin E	10% 1.54 mg
Vitamin K	325% 390 μg
Minerals	Quantity %DV^{†}
Calcium	12% 150 mg
Iron	8% 1.5 mg
Magnesium	11% 47 mg
Manganese	29% 0.66 mg
Phosphorus	7% 92 mg
Potassium	16% 491 mg
Selenium	2% 0.9 μg
Sodium	2% 38 mg
Zinc	5% 0.6 mg
- Other constituents: Quantity
- Water: 84.0 g
- Link to full USDA Database entry
- ^{†}Percentages estimated using US recommendations for adults, except for potassium, which is estimated based on expert recommendation from the National Academies.

Kale, cooked, boiled, drained, without salt
Nutritional value per 100 g (3.5 oz)
- Energy: 117 kJ (28 kcal)
- Carbohydrates: 5.63 g
- Sugars: 1.25 g
- Dietary fiber: 2 g
- Fat: 0.4 g
- Protein: 1.9 g
Vitamins and minerals
Vitamins	Quantity %DV^{†}
Vitamin A equiv. lutein zeaxanthin	16% 146 μg 4983 μg
Thiamine (B1)	4% 0.053 mg
Riboflavin (B2)	5% 0.07 mg
Niacin (B3)	3% 0.5 mg
Pantothenic acid (B5)	1% 0.05 mg
Vitamin B6	8% 0.138 mg
Folate (B9)	3% 13 μg
Choline	0% 0.4 mg
Vitamin C	46% 41 mg
Vitamin E	6% 0.85 mg
Vitamin K	348% 418 μg
Minerals	Quantity %DV^{†}
Calcium	6% 72 mg
Iron	5% 0.9 mg
Magnesium	4% 18 mg
Manganese	18% 0.416 mg
Phosphorus	2% 28 mg
Potassium	8% 228 mg
Selenium	2% 0.9 μg
Sodium	1% 23 mg
Zinc	2% 0.24 mg
- Other constituents: Quantity
- Water: 91.2 g
- Link to full USDA database entry
- ^{†}Percentages estimated using US recommendations for adults, except for potassium, which is estimated based on expert recommendation from the National Academies.

Raw kale is 84% water, 9% carbohydrates, 4% protein, and 1% fat (table). In a 100 g (3 1/2 oz) serving, raw kale provides 207 kilojoules (49 kilocalories) of food energy and 3.7 times the Daily Value (DV) of vitamin K. It is a rich source (20% or more of the DV) of vitamin A, vitamin C, folate, and manganese (see table "Kale, raw"). Kale is a good source (10–19% DV) of riboflavin, pantothenic acid, vitamin B6, vitamin E, and several dietary minerals, including calcium, magnesium, and potassium (table). Boiling raw kale diminishes most of these nutrients, while values for vitamins A, C, and K and manganese remain substantial (table for cooked kale).

=== Phytochemicals ===
Kale is a source of the carotenoids, lutein and zeaxanthin. As with broccoli and other cruciferous vegetables, kale contains glucosinolate compounds, such as glucoraphanin, which contributes to the formation of sulforaphane, a compound under preliminary research for its potential health effects.

Boiling kale decreases the level of glucosinate compounds, whereas steaming, microwaving, or stir frying does not cause significant loss. Kale is high in oxalic acid, the levels of which can be reduced by cooking.

Kale contains high levels of polyphenols, such as ferulic acid, with levels varying due to environmental and genetic factors.

=== Culinary ===
==== Snack product ====
Kale chips have been produced as a potato chip substitute.

==== Regional uses ====
===== Europe =====
In the Netherlands, a traditional winter dish called "boerenkoolstamppot" is a mix of curly kale and mashed potatoes, sometimes with fried bacon, and served with rookworst ("smoked sausage").

In Northern Germany, there is a winter tradition known as "Kohlfahrt" ("kale trip"), where a group of people will go on a hike through the woods during the day before gathering at an inn or private residence where kale is served, usually with bacon and Kohlwurst ("kale sausage"). Kale is considered a Northern German staple and comfort food.

In Italy, cavolo nero kale is an ingredient of the Tuscan soup ribollita.

A traditional Portuguese soup, caldo verde, combines pureed potatoes, very finely sliced kale, olive oil and salt. Additional ingredients can include broth and sliced, cooked spicy sausage.

In Scotland, kale provided such a base for a traditional diet that the word in some Scots dialects is synonymous with food. To be "off one's kail" is to feel too ill to eat.

In Ireland, kale is mixed with mashed potatoes to make the traditional dish colcannon. It is popular on Halloween, when it may be served with sausages.

In the United Kingdom, the cultivation of kale (and other vegetables) was encouraged during World War II via the Dig for Victory campaign.

===== Asia =====
In Sri Lanka, it is known as kola gova or ela gova. It is cultivated for edible use. A dish called 'kale mallung' is served almost everywhere on the island, along with rice.

===== United States =====
For most of the 20th century, kale was primarily used in the U.S. for decorative purposes; it became more commonly consumed starting in the 1990s, mainly due to its nutritional value. It is now one of the most popular greens in the U.S., and is commonly used in salads and green smoothies.

== In culture ==
The Kailyard school of Scottish writers, which included J. M. Barrie (creator of Peter Pan), consisted of authors who wrote about traditional rural Scottish life (kailyard = 'kale field'). In Cuthbertson's book Autumn in Kyle and the charm of Cunninghame, he states that Kilmaurs in East Ayrshire was famous for its kale, which was an important foodstuff. A story is told in which a neighbouring village offered to pay a generous price for some kale seeds, an offer too good to turn down. The locals agreed, but a gentle roasting on a shovel over a coal fire ensured the seeds never germinated.

== Gallery ==
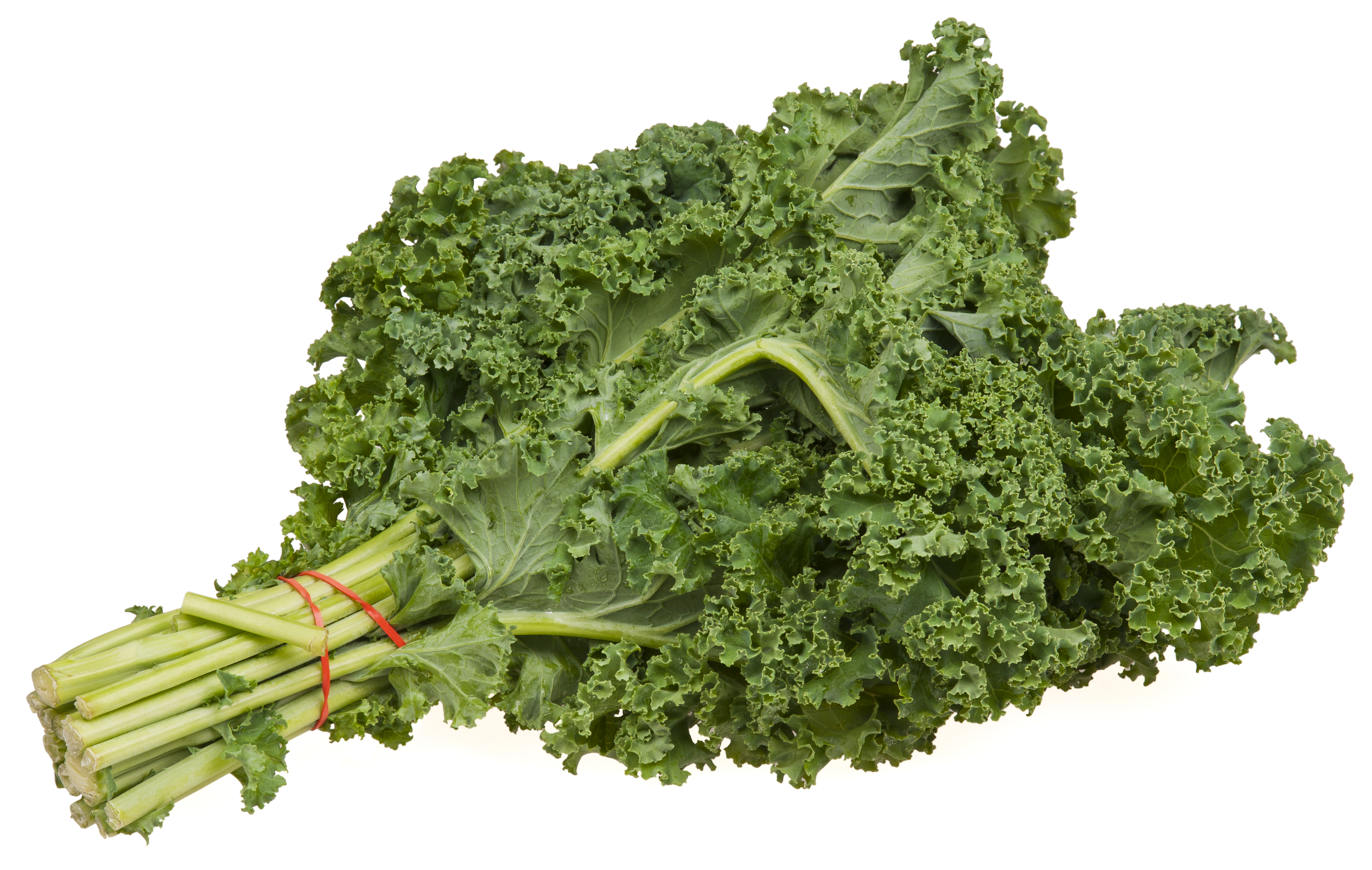
Curly-leaf kale

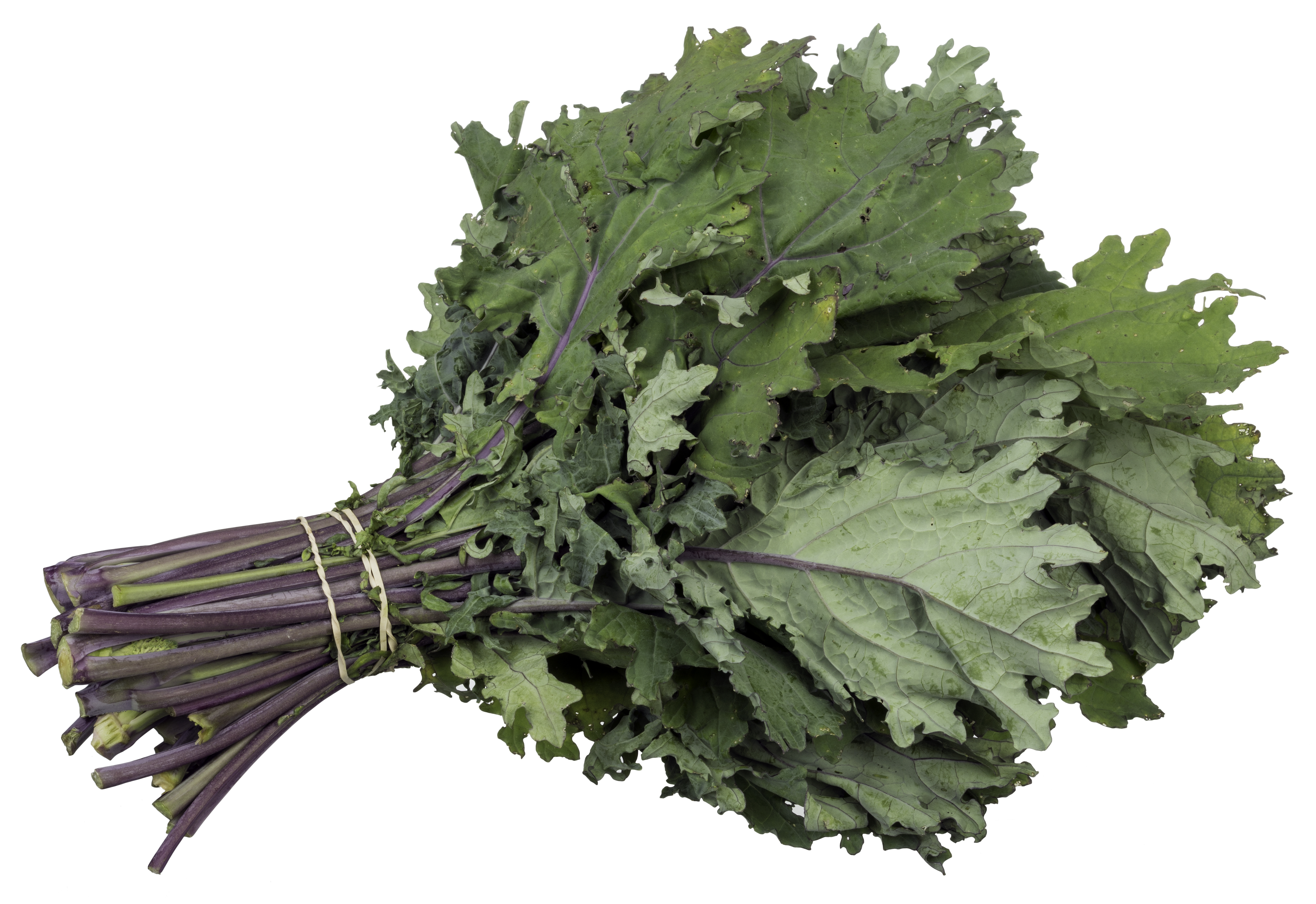
Red Russian kale

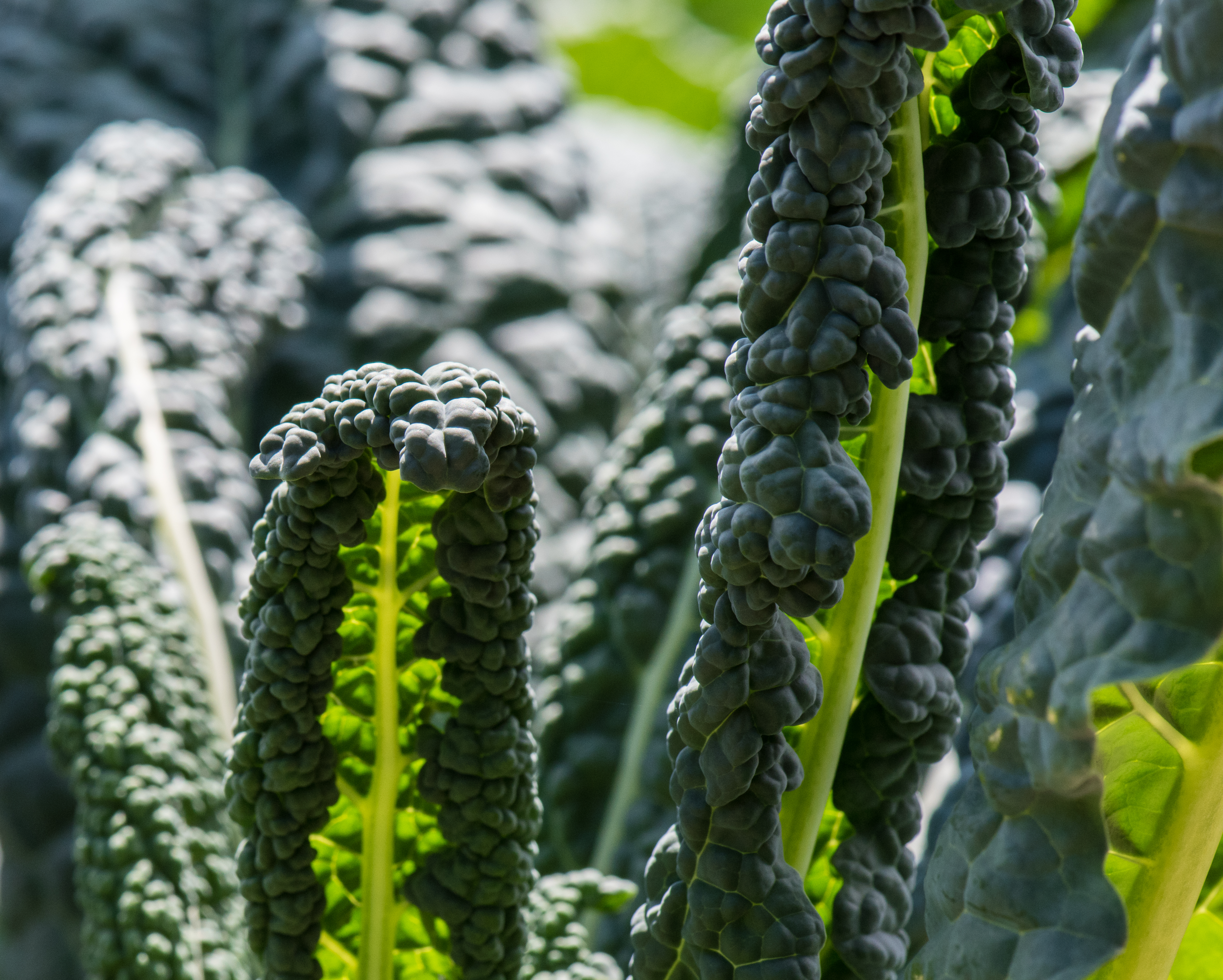
Tuscan kale

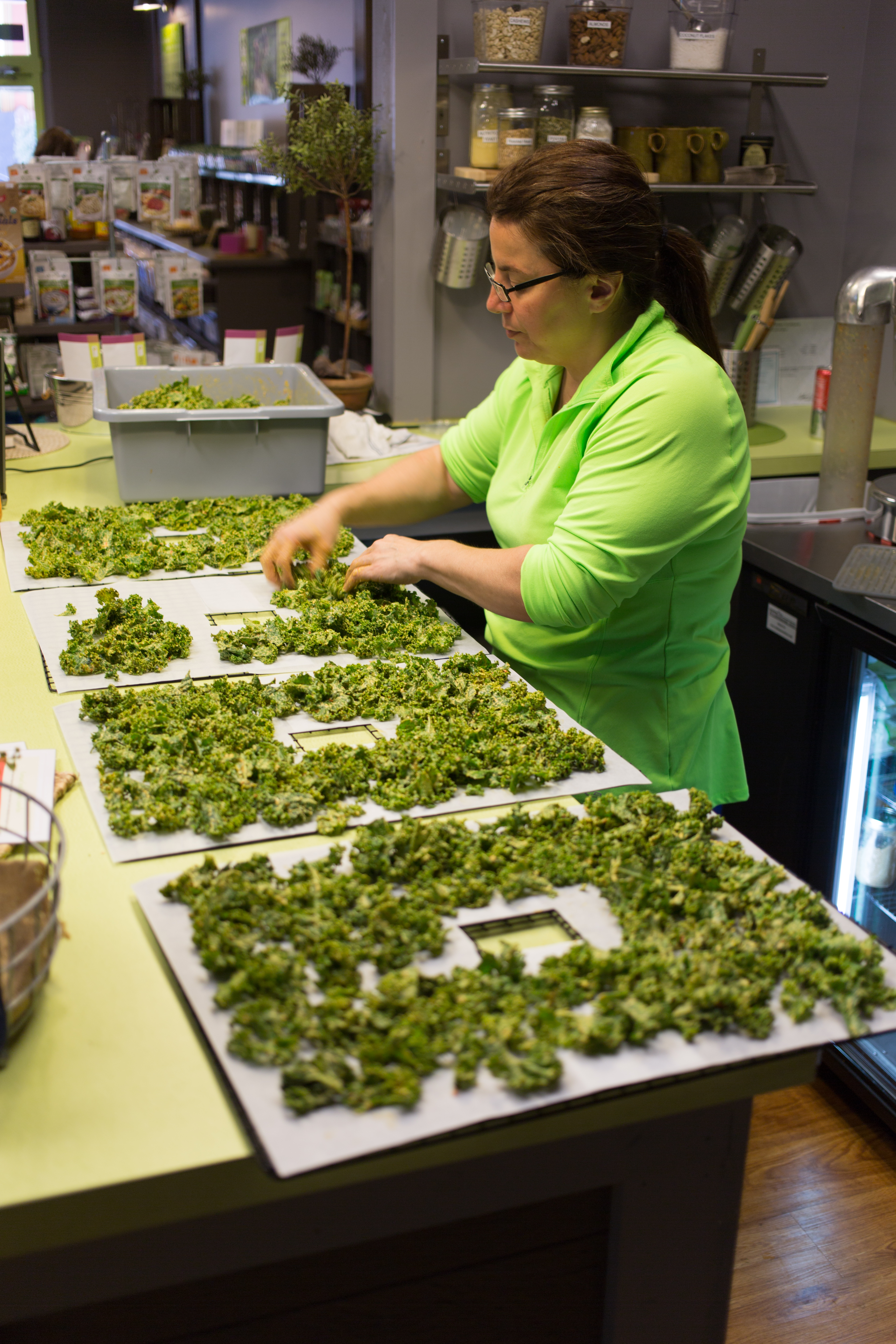
Making kale chips

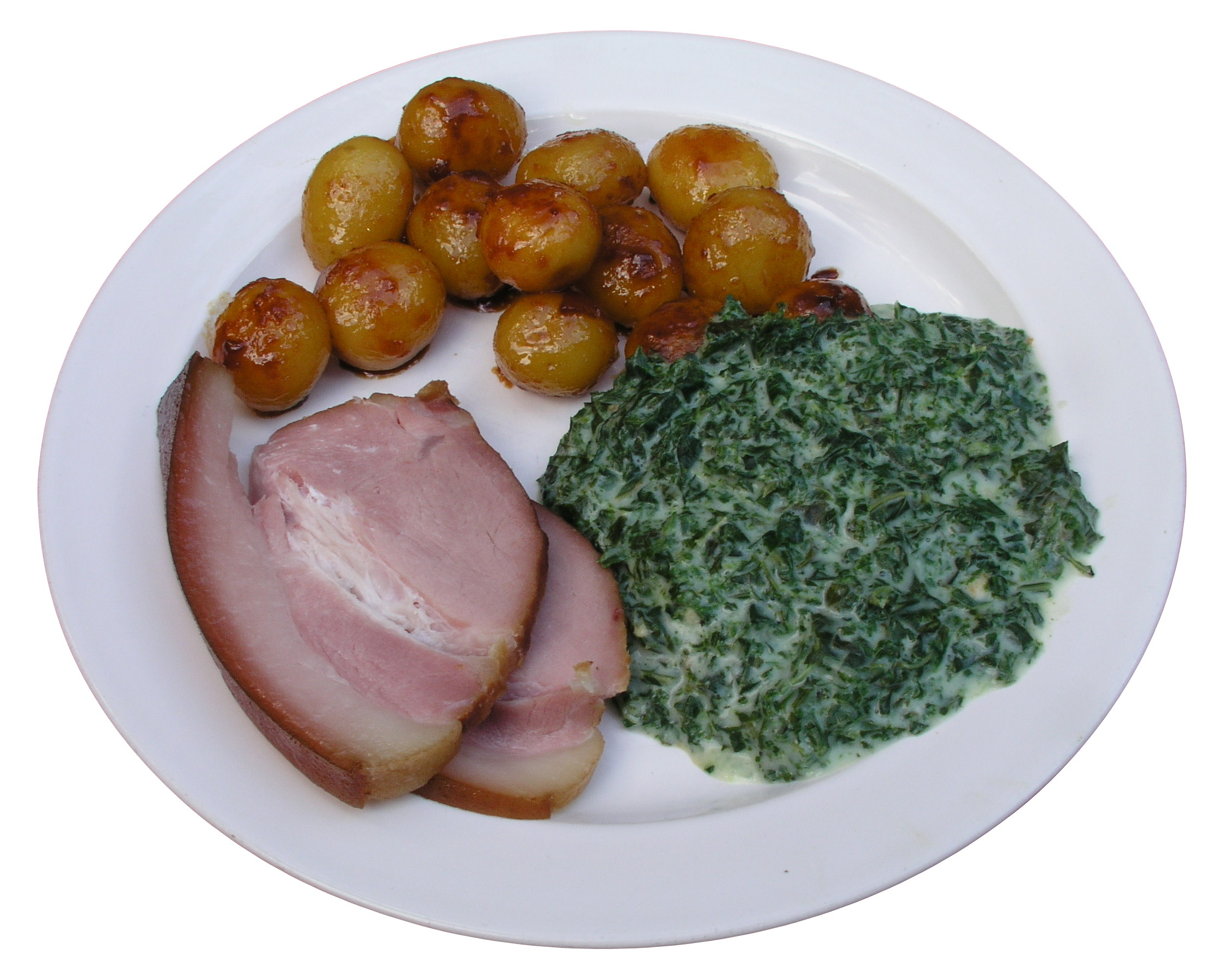
A traditional New Years Danish dish: boiled ham, glazed potatoes and stewed kale

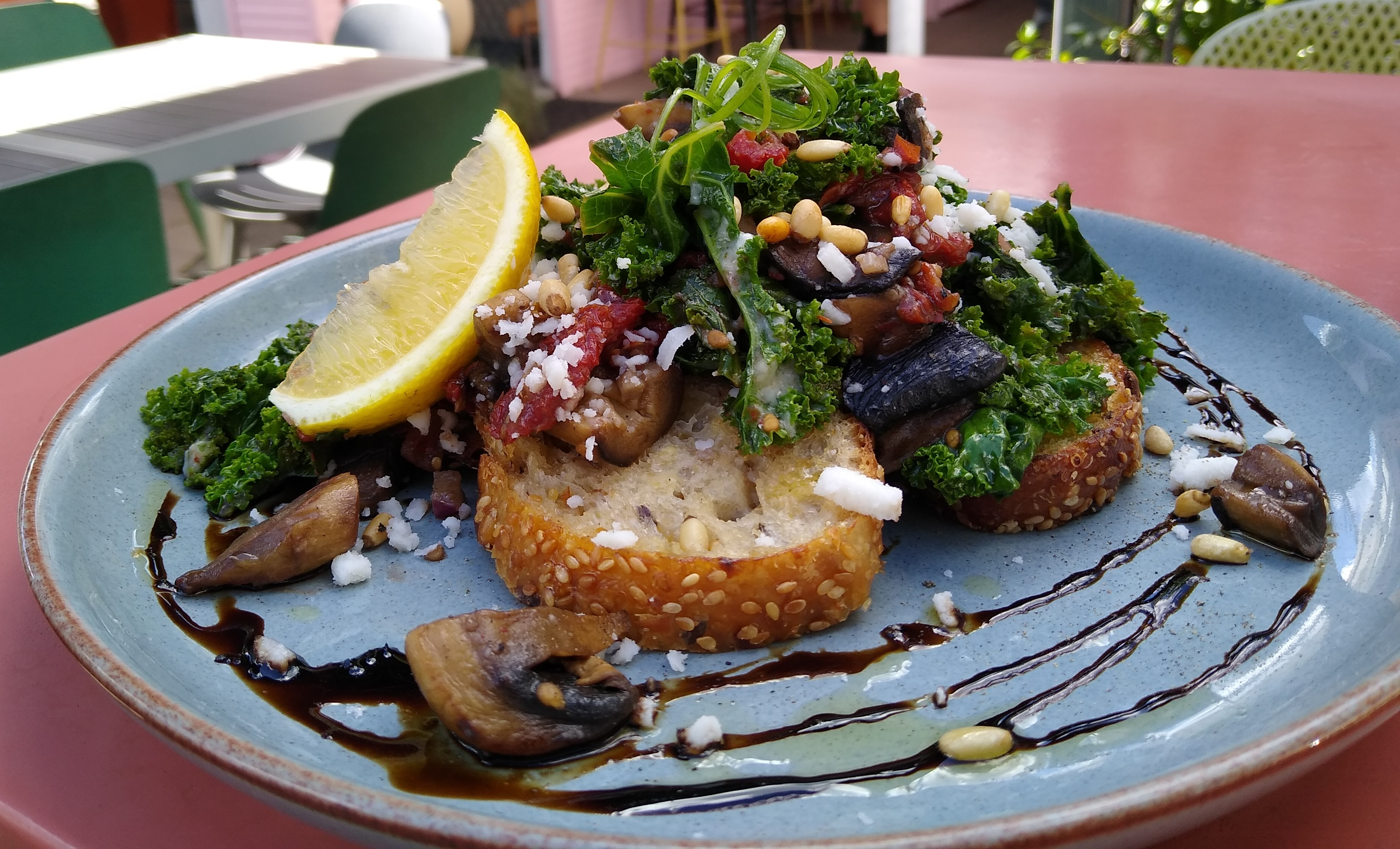
A kale-based dish with other vegetables and sourdough bread, served at a restaurant in Australia

== See also ==
- Bowen's Kale
- Crambe maritima – sea kale
- Leaf vegetable
- Kalettes
- Cabbage
- Swiss chard
- Mustard greens
