= Trinxat =

Potato, cabbage, and pork dish from the Pyrenees

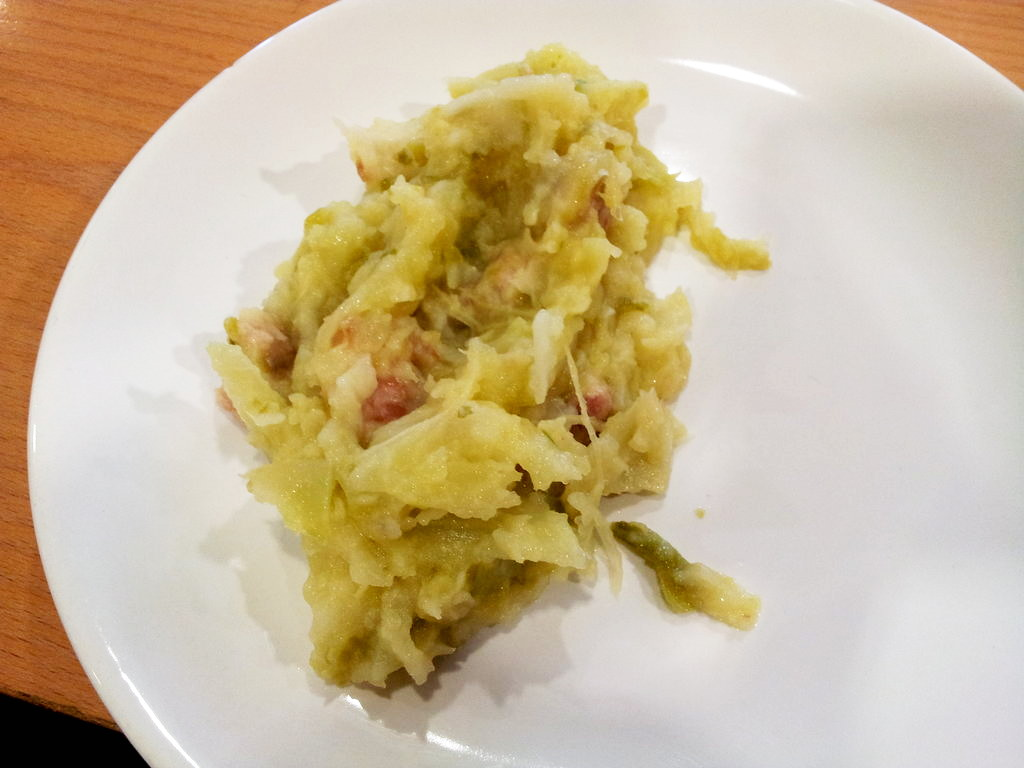
- Course: Side dish
- Place of origin: Spain
- Region or state: Catalonia
- Main ingredients: Potatoes, cabbage, pork

Trinxat (Catalan pronunciation: [tɾiɲˈʃat]) is a food from the Pyrenees, principally Andorra and the Catalan comarques of Cerdanya and Alt Urgell. It is made with potatoes, cabbage and pork meat, and resembles bubble and squeak. The name, meaning “mashed” or “chopped”, is the past participle of the Catalan word trinxar, which means "to slice". It is sometimes served with salt herring or eaten on its own with bread.

== See also ==
- List of potato dishes
- List of pork dishes
- List of meat and potato dishes
