= Cuisine of Hamburg =

Regional cuisine

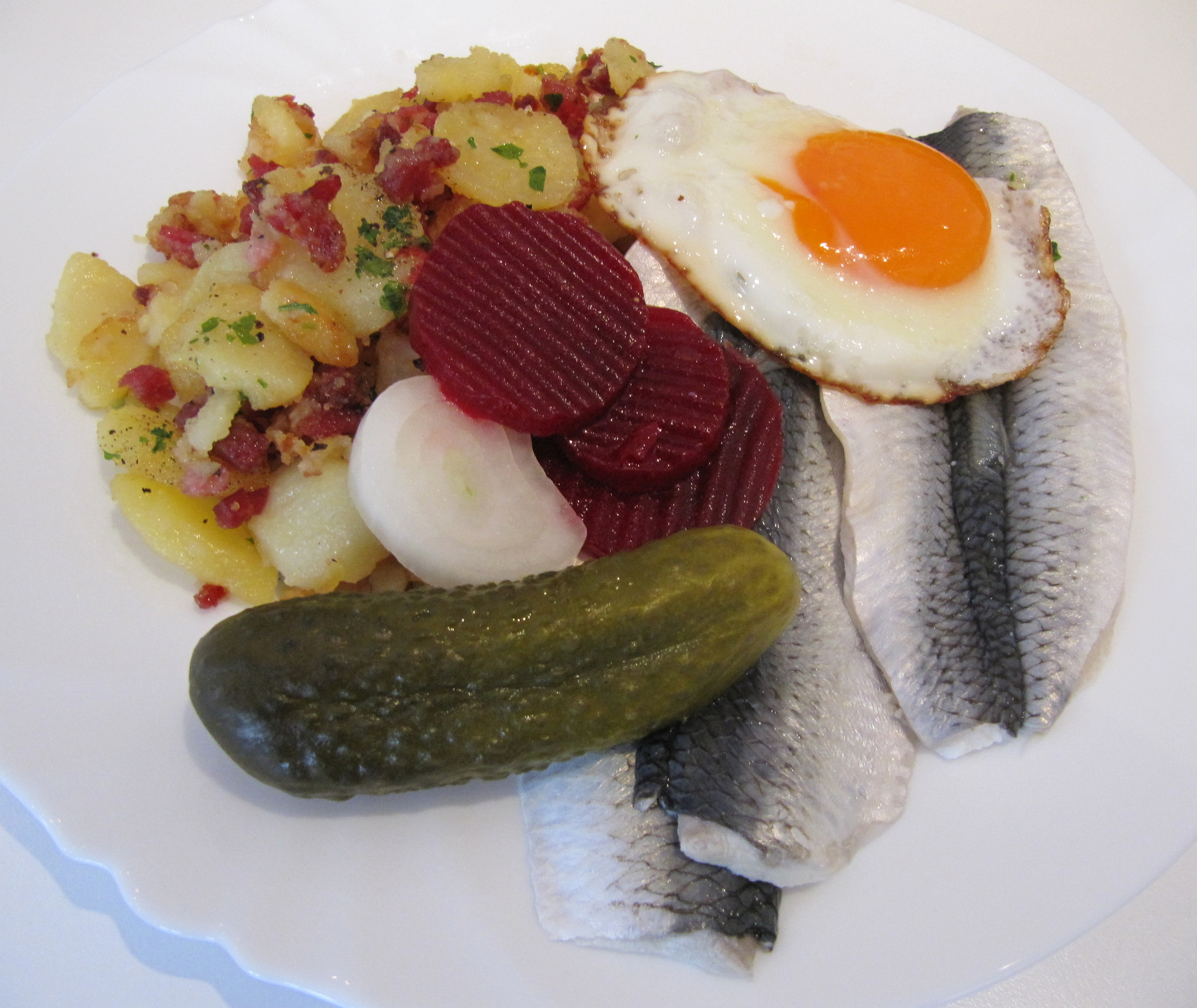
Traditional and simple lunch in Hamburg: Bismarckhering, Bratkartoffeln, and Spiegelei

Due to its centuries-old history as a major port town the cuisine of Hamburg is very diversified and sapid as ingredients' supply was safe. Until the 20th century, the cuisine of Hamburg was predominantly characterized by the extensive choice of different kinds of fish from the river Elbe and the nearby Baltic Sea. The region of Vierlande supplied Hamburg with fresh vegetables. Fruit came from the area Altes Land and until industrialization the neighbourhood of Wilhelmsburg was considered the ‘milk isle’ of Hamburg. International trade in the Port of Hamburg made spices and exotic nutrition items from India and South America available since the 16th century, which were soon incorporated into civic kitchens. On this basis, the cuisine of Hamburg developed which regrettably lost some of its characteristics nowadays due to the supraregional harmonization of the North German cuisine. But due to its high economic importance, Hamburg does feature many internationally recognized gourmet restaurants from which 11 were repeatedly awarded with a Michelin star in 2010.

== Historical aspects ==
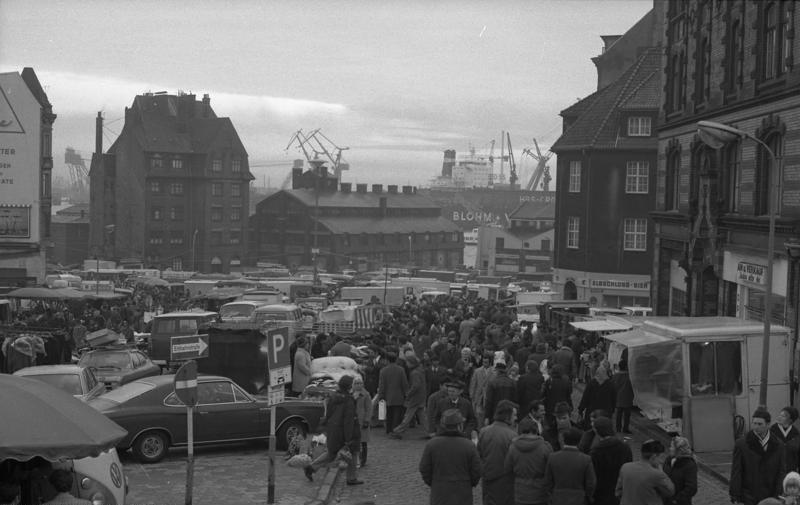
The fish market of Hamburg in 1973 (courtesy of the Bundesarchiv, B 145, Bild-F041596-0009)

For much of its history Hamburg has been a major trading hub, resulting in both the development of a wealthy mercantile class, and a wide availability of goods from around the world. In the homes of wealthy residents, the kitchens were located in the back of the house, and divided into two parts. One part was the "splendor kitchen", in which the tin and copper tableware was exhibited, and the other part was the real "work kitchen", with a brick-built stove made of clay. The crockery and cutlery were kept in a cupboard called the Schapp in the hallway, jars and bowls in the Richtbank, which was a table or low cupboard on which dishes and meals were prepared and arranged for serving. Since the 18th century there were also kitchens that were built into the cellars in the homes of tradesmen. However many of the traditional dishes have their origins in the lower-class households of Hamburg's population. There were no separated kitchens in the homes and booths of the impecunious and poor and, as firewood was quite expensive, ovens were seldom used for cooking. This means that warm dishes were rare and if there was any cooking, the dish was most commonly prepared as a stew. A famous legend of the Lachsessen (lit.: salmon meal) hints to the nutritional differences between social classes. According to it, Hamburg had such an abundant amount of salmon that even the poor did not want to eat it. The council of Hamburg then enacted an edict saying that masters were not allowed to give salmon to their maidservants and minions more frequently than twice a week. Though this is only a legend it is indeed true that salmon were widely available since the 19th century.

== Regional cuisine ==
=== Fish dishes ===
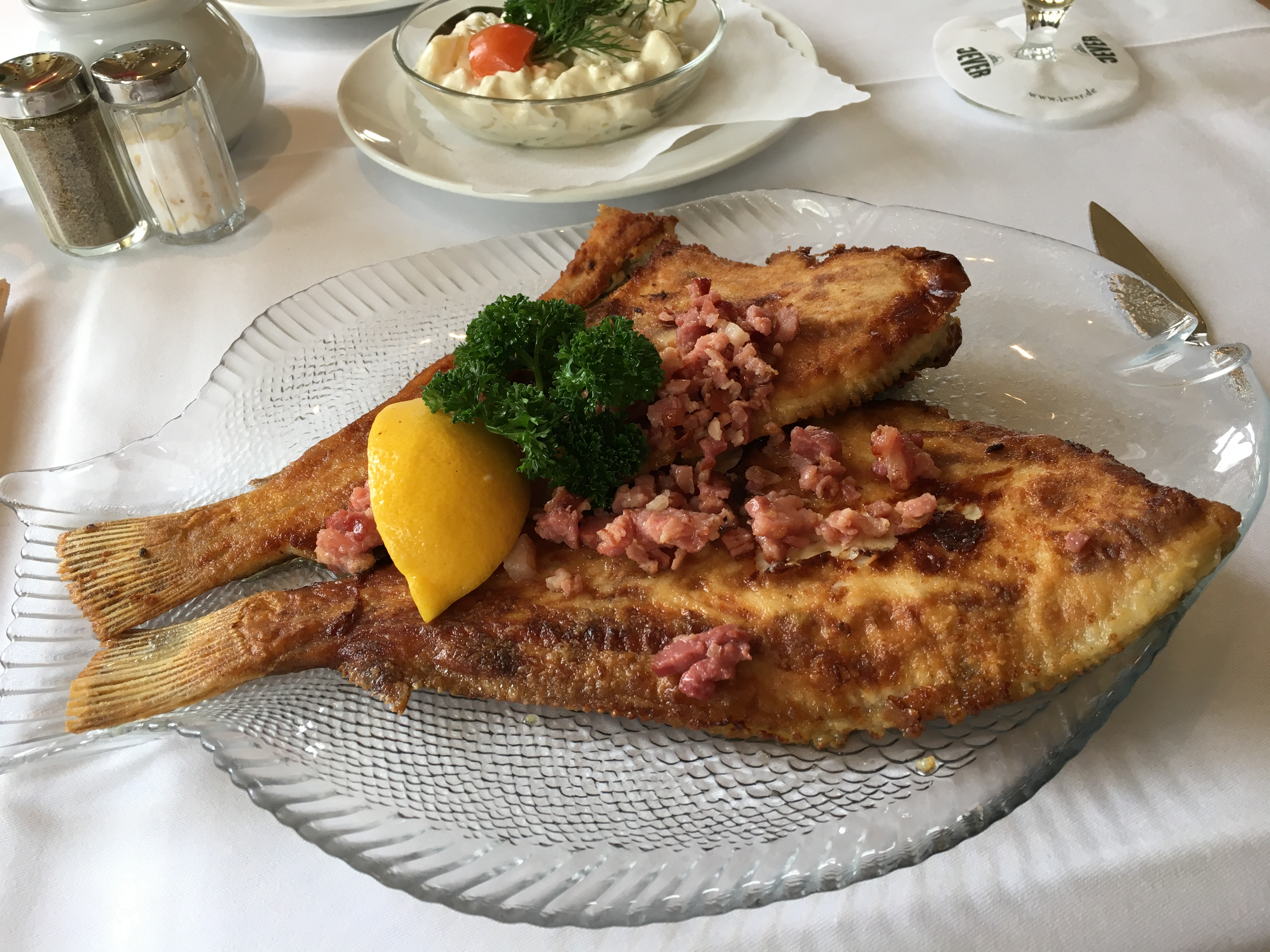
Fried plaice with bacon, Finkenwerder style

Due to its location on the Elbe river and its proximity to the sea, the regional cuisine features many fish dishes. In addition to preserved herring dishes like Matjes or Bismarckhering, green herring ('green' meaning fresh, hence not marinated, fried or cured) is also very common. A fried herring becomes a Brathering if it is marinated in vinegar after frying. Another famous fish dish is Räucheraal, which is a smoked eel and was already featured by street vendors since the early 19th century and could be found on the dinner menus of many local restaurants. The dish Finkenwerder Scholle is another speciality which is considered typical for the cuisine of Hamburg as well as Pannfisch with baked potatoes, a dish that features fish leftovers in a mustard sauce. Carp is traditionally served for Christmas dinner or on New Year's Eve, and the omnipresent Fischbrötchen is a roll with raw or fried fish inside that is sold as street food.

=== Soups and stews ===
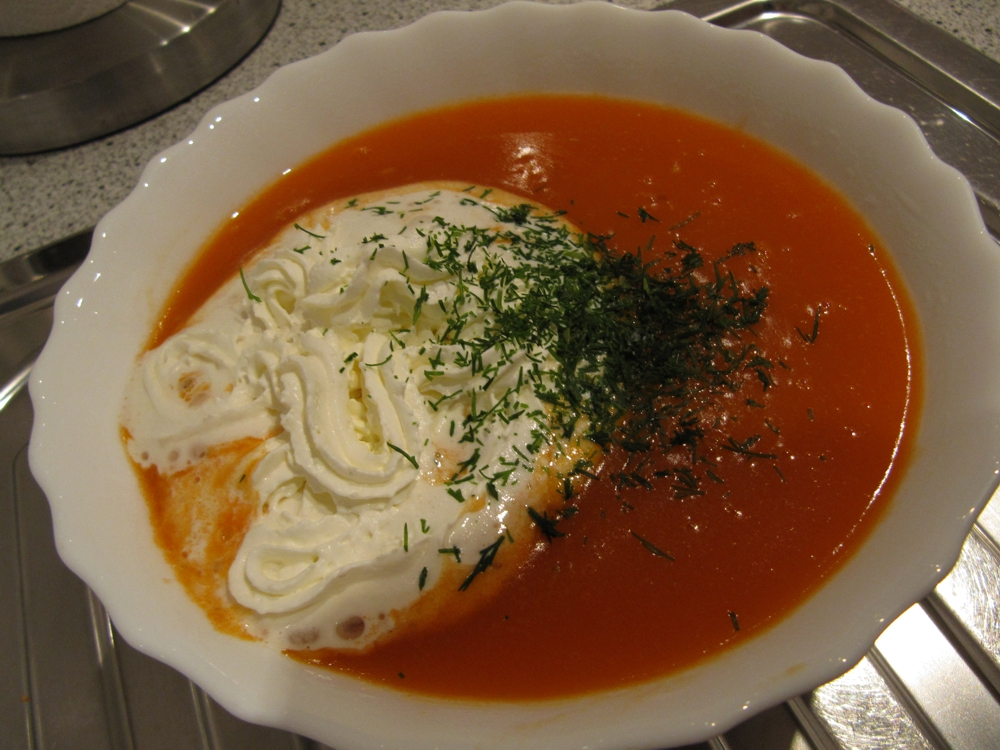
Hamburger Hummersuppe

One of the most popular soups in Hamburg, is the creamy lobster soup called Hamburger Hummersuppe which is served with a small amount of whipped cream and garnished with dill. A variation of this soup is the small shrimp soup Hamburg style, called Hamburger Krabbensuppe. Adding a dash of cognac to both variations is optional but very common. The Hamburg variation on the Steckrübeneintopf which is popular all over North Germany is called 'Hamburger National'. Birnen, Bohnen und Speck, Labskaus, and the Hamburger Aalsuppe are further examples for the stews of Hamburg of which the latter is a vegetable stew with root, green vegetables and dried fruit which rose to supraregional popularity due to the controversy if it has to be served with or without eel. However, the preparation without eel is considered folk-etymological.

=== Snack food ===
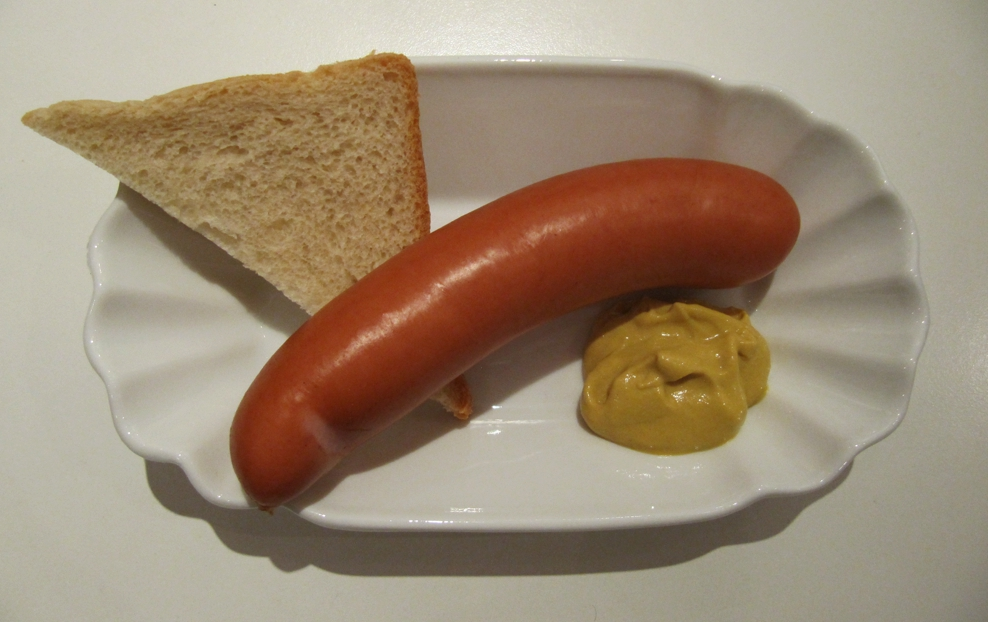
Knackwurst as typically served as a snack in Hamburg, Germany, on classic dishware

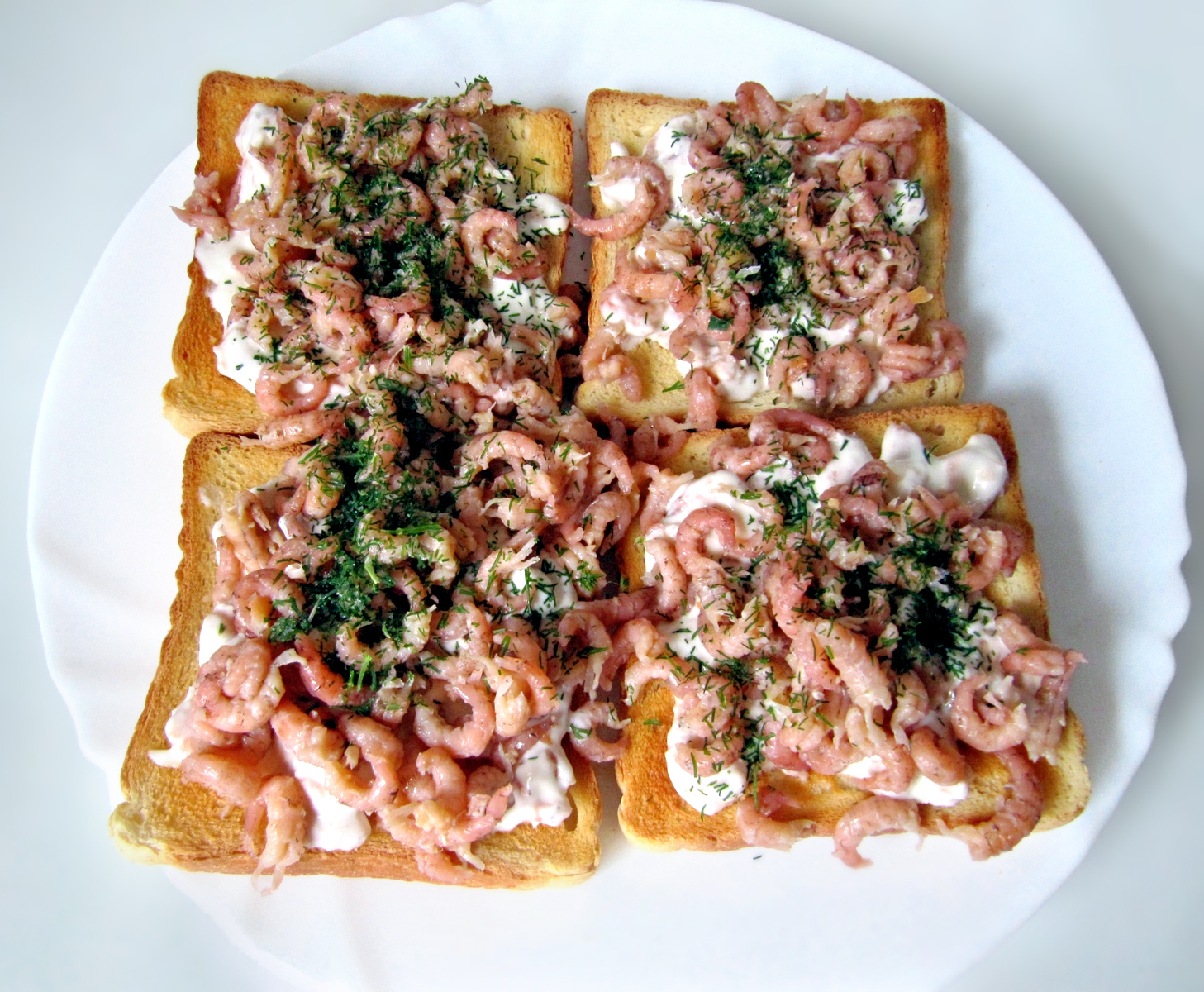
Popular for breakfast or as a snack: Krabbentoast

As in any larger city, there is a great variety of snacks available in Hamburg. Apart from international products like doner kebab, Asian cuisine, or pizza, there are some snacks with a local or regional tradition. Next to the popular fish sandwiches which are called Fischbrötchen, toasted white bread with small brown shrimps from the North Sea called Krabbentoast is popular either for breakfast or as a snack at lunchtime. Other popular snacks are Currywurst which comes in different styles made with different kind of sausages, or Knackwurst.

=== Main dishes ===
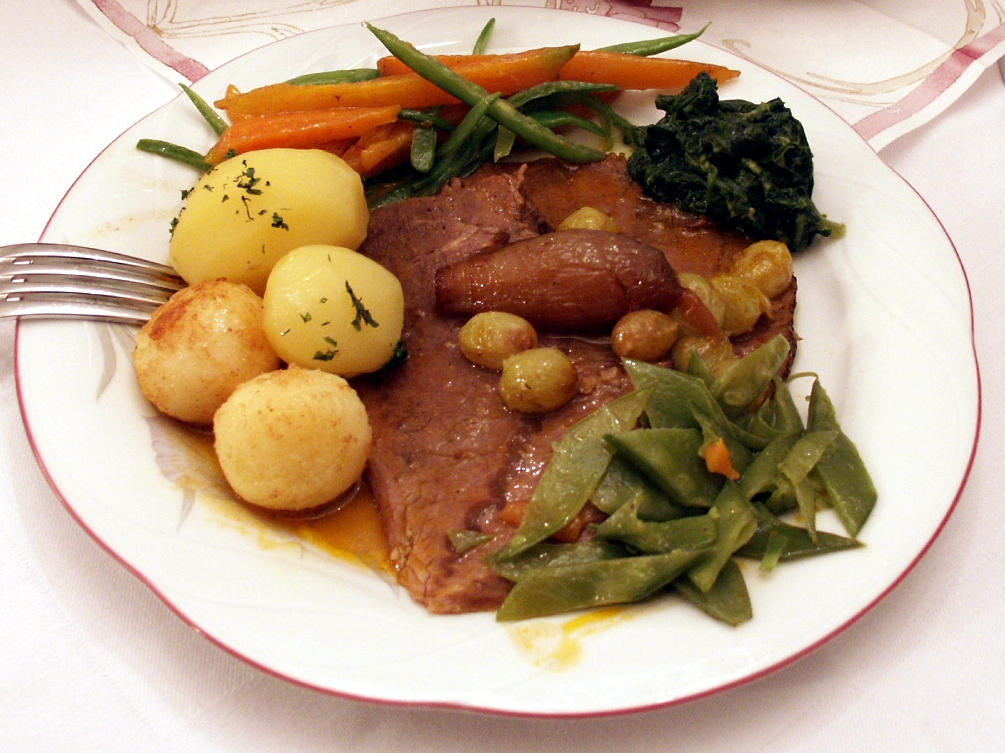
Roast beef Hamburg style with all the goings

A main dish of Hamburg cuisine which originates in the bourgeois cuisine owes its development to the intensive trade with Portugal. It features oxtail in Madeira wine and is nowadays rather used as soup course instead of the main dish. Other important dishes are Schwarzsauer (a sour kind of blood soup), Himmel, Erde und Hölle and poultry dishes using chicken, duck and goose. Especially 'Stubenküken' are considered a forgotten speciality and is a dish using young chicken which were bred in spring. As it holds true for the whole neighbouring area of North Germany the cuisine of Hamburg often features kale in its dishes as well which is reflected in famous dishes e.g. Grünkohl or Kohlrouladen mit Wirsing.

=== Dessert ===
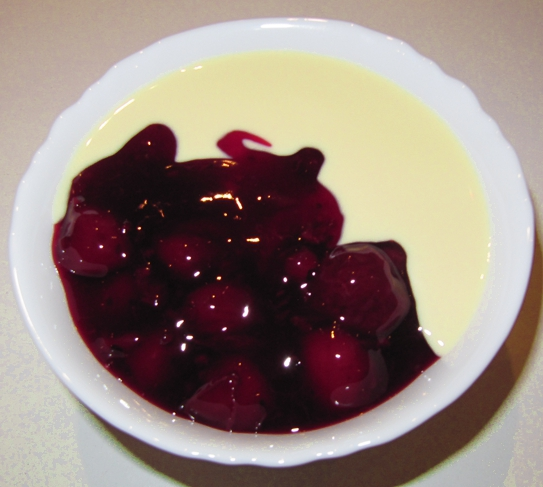
Rote Grütze with vanilla sauce

Typical sweet dishes of the cuisine of Hamburg are Rote Grütze with milk, vanilla sauce, vanilla ice cream, or liquid cream, Fliederbeersuppe (elderberry soup), Großer Hans (a flour dumpling eaten with cherry compote and bread pudding with lemon sauce.

=== Baked goods ===
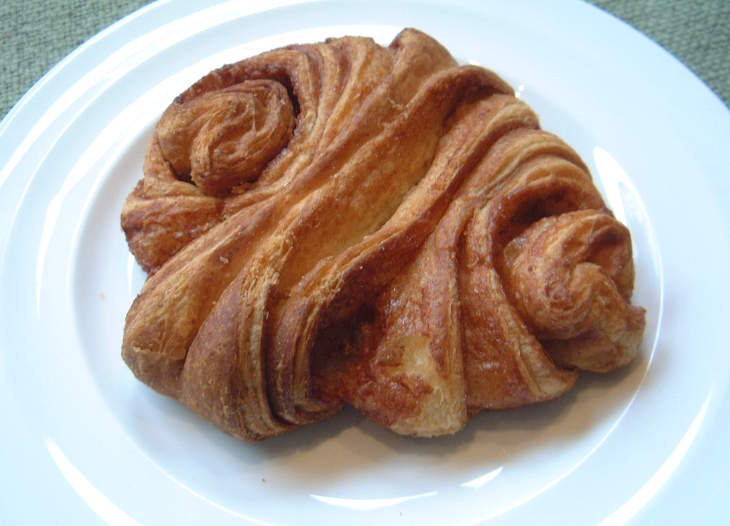
A typical Franzbrötchen

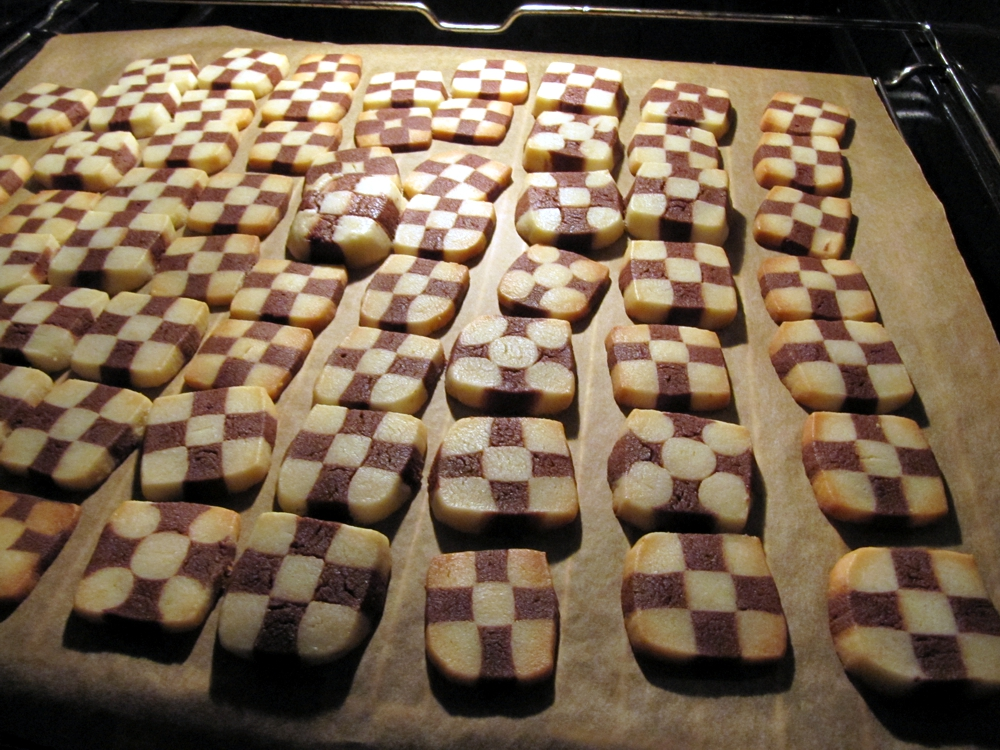
Black and white cookies are popular along with Kaffee und Kuchen.

The original bread roll of Hamburg is called "Rundstück" (lit.: round piece) and those that were not eaten for breakfast are plated with slices of roasted pork, smothered in sauce and are then called "Rundstück warm" for lunch (lit.: round piece warm). A famous bread is Schwarzbrot, a dark and fluffy whole wheat bread. For tea (or 'coffee and cake' as teatime is called in Germany) Kopenhagener are served which is filled with jam or marzipan. Another famous baked good for 'coffee and cake' is the traditional apple pie of Hamburg which is prepared by pan frying the apples and deglazing them with white wine before baking the actual cake. "Black and white cookies", either self-made or bought in local pastry shops, are popular in Hamburg, too. Franzbrötchen are also very popular: Despite the name contains the word Brötchen, it is not a roll but a kind of flaky pastry typical only for Hamburg and baked with much butter and cinnamon. Locals enjoy it for breakfast, too. In Christmas times, there's Klöben (also called 'Stollen' in other parts of Germany), a bread-shaped pastry made of yeast dough with raisins and succade. 'Braune Kuchen' (lit.: brown cakes) are crisp rectangular biscuits baked with molasses and gingerbread spice that are based on a recipe developed back in 1782 from the Konditorei Kemm. 'Weiße Kuchen' (lit.: white cakes) however are a kind of fried dough foods. The so-called Heißwecken (lit.: hot rolls) are a yeast dough product with raisins that are dusted with confectioner's sugar and filled with cream, and are traditionally eaten during lent.

=== Candy and sweets ===
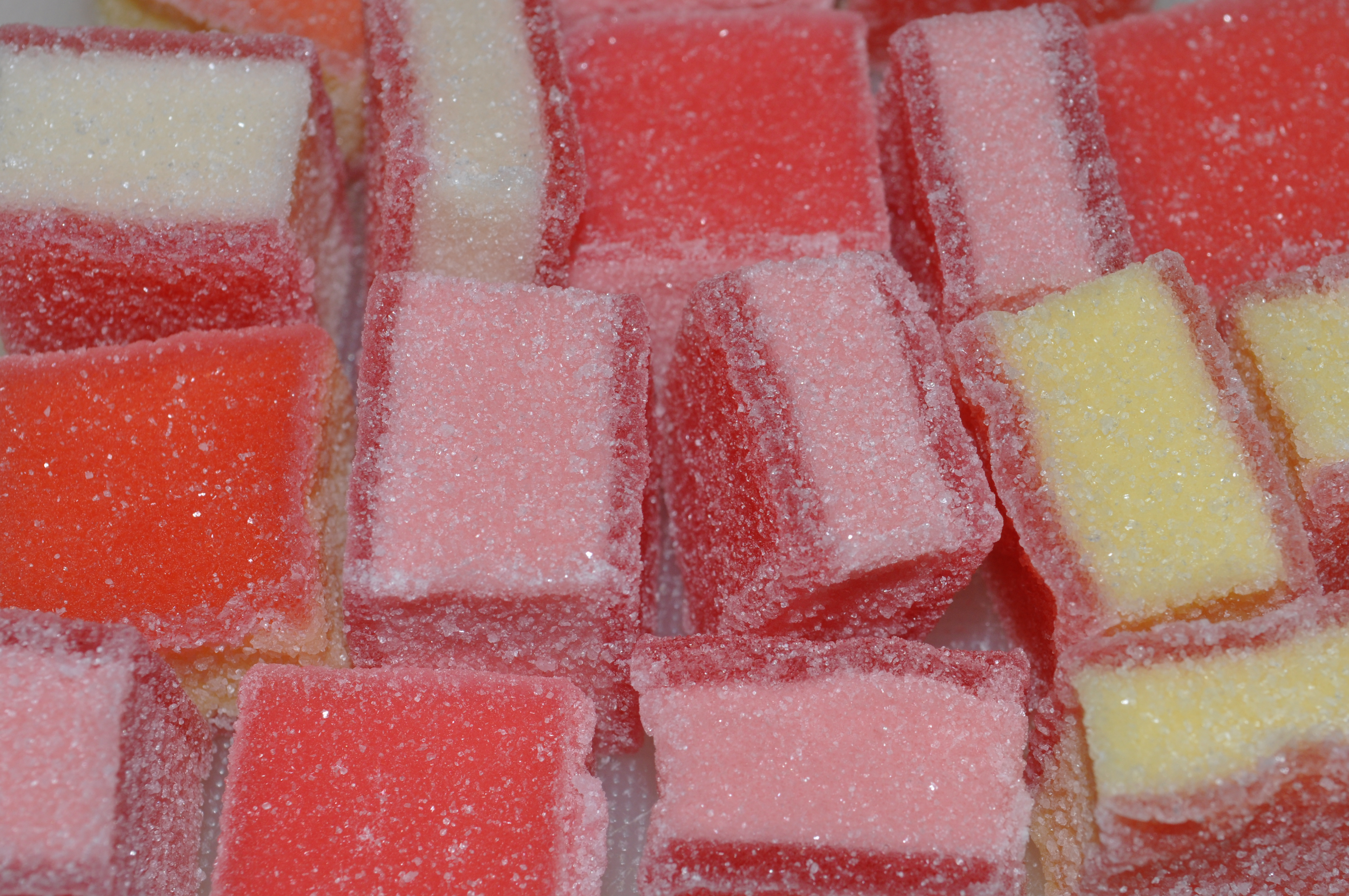
Cubes of Hamburger Speck

Hamburger Speck is a sort of candy made out of foamed sugar with various coatings. The color is often reminiscent of the colors of Hamburg, red-white-red. The name refers to the similarity with bacon (or speck).

== Drinks ==
=== Beer ===
Beer has been brewed in Hamburg since the early 14th century. In the year 1375, there were 457 breweries, 270 of which also exported beer. The yearly production was about 170,000 hectoliters. In the centuries that followed beer exports increased due to quality enhancements because of production changes (more wheat beer was produced and the production of dark beer and red ale decreased). The recipe was guarded like a secret treasure and since the time of the Hanseatic League, which opened the trade, the export of beer formed the base of Hamburg's wealth, the city being considered the 'brewery of the Hanse'. In the 16th century 600 breweries are noted in historical sources which exported the beer as far as Sweden and Russia and since the 17th century even bock beer was exported from Hamburg. In the 18th century, both production and export decreased, and the beer market did not recover until the fast growth of population in the late 19th century. In 1890 there were just 32 breweries and nowadays there are only two old breweries in existence, the Holsten Brewery and the Gröninger brewery.

=== Spirits ===
The predominant kinds of schnapps until the mid of the 20th century were Köm, the northern German version of Aquavit or Korn (distilled from rye or wheat). The small island of Neuwerk in the North Sea, which belongs to Hamburg, is famous for producing its own Aquavit. Especially the trade with South America brought Rum to the city, which is featured in the Grog, a popular drink not only amongst seamen.

=== Import of wine ===
The main focus was laid on the import of wines from Médoc which were stored in barrels with little temperature variabilities in a humid and foggy climate to mature and which incorporated the typical 'Rotspon' flavor.

=== Import of coffee and tea ===
The different varieties of coffee and tea became popular in Hamburg in the 17th century. It was widely consumed and several coffee houses developed, of which the first one is documented in the year 1677.

Even nowadays, the majority of the coffee and tea import of Germany is managed by the port of Hamburg. The varieties are also mixed (and in case of coffee beans roasted) in Hamburg and are then distributed throughout Germany and other parts of continental Europe.
