= Glucoalyssin =

Identifiers
CAS Number	499-37-6
3D model (JSmol)	Interactive image
ChEBI	CHEBI:5395
ChemSpider	7863545
EC Number	112-312-5
KEGG	C08400
PubChem CID	9589398
CompTox Dashboard (EPA)	DTXSID40964470
- InChI: InChI=1S/C13H25NO10S3/c1-26(19)6-4-2-3-5-9(14-24-27(20,21)22)25-13-12(18)11(17)10(16)8(7-15)23-13/h8,10-13,15-18H,2-7H2,1H3,(H,20,21,22)/b14-9-/t8-,10-,11+,12-,13+,26?/m1/s1 Key: HUCGRJSHMZWRQQ-PWGYDFSISA-N
- SMILES: CS(=O)CCCCC/C(=N/OS(=O)(=O)O)/S[C@H]1[C@@H]([C@H]([C@@H]([C@H](O1)CO)O)O)O

Properties
Chemical formula	C_{13}H_{25}NO_{10}S_{3}
Molar mass	451.5 g·mol^{−1}

Hazards
- GHS labelling
Pictograms	(GHS07: Exclamation mark)
Signal word	Warning
Hazard statements	H317
Precautionary statements	P261, P272, P280, P302+P352, P321, P333+P317, P362+P364, P501
- Except where otherwise noted, data are given for materials in their standard state (at 25 °C [77 °F], 100 kPa). Infobox references

Glucoalyssin is an organic compound belonging to the group of glucosinolates, naturally found in cruciferous vegetables. It is structurally similar to glucoberteroin, which contains a thioether unit in the side chain rather than a sulfoxide unit.

== Occurrence ==
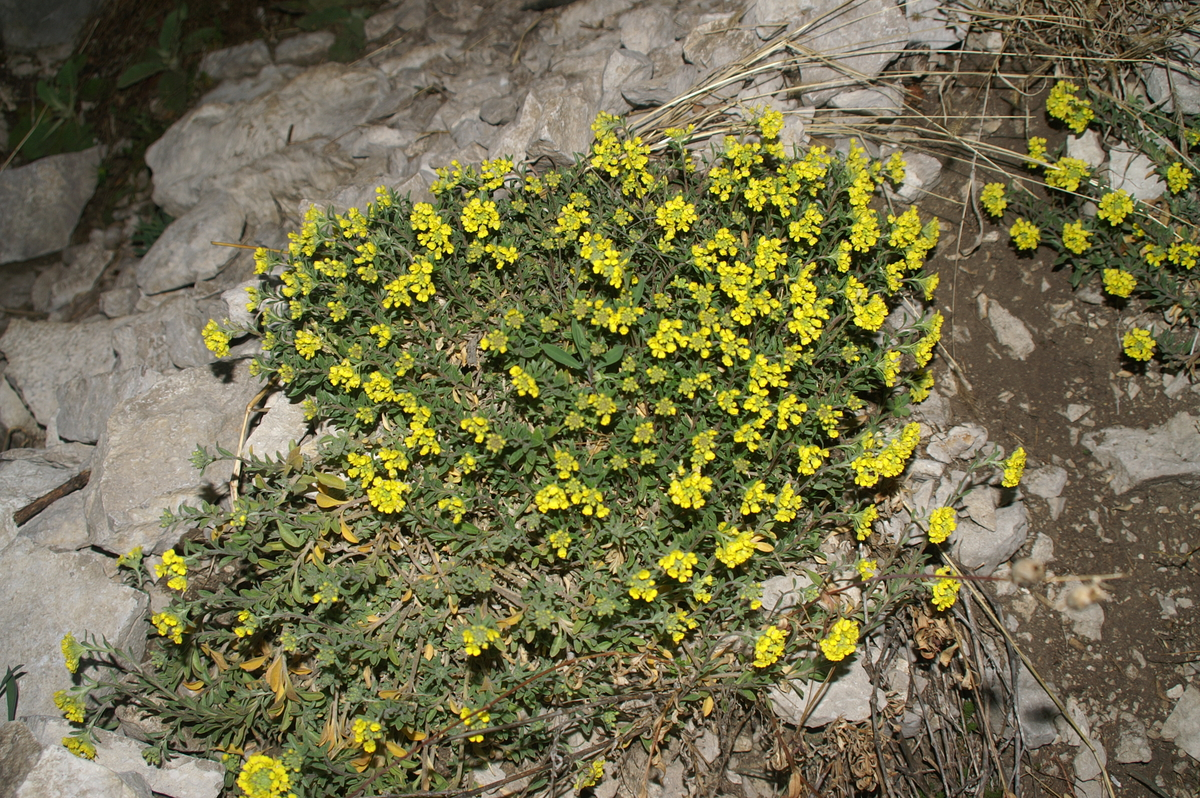
Mountain rockweed

Glucoalyssin was first isolated in the 1950s from Alyssum argenteum. It is also present in other species of the genus stonecrop (Alyssum), such as Alyssum montanum and Alyssum alyssoides. It generally occurs alongside smaller quantities of glucoberteroin, which is likely also the biosynthesis precursor of glucoalyssin. It is not present as a racemate but in a specific angle of rotation, existing as L-(-)-glucoalyssin. In Degenia velebitica, glucoalyssin coexists with glucoberteroin, primarily concentrated in the stems and leaves, whereas the seeds mainly contain glucoberteroin. A genetic study examined the formation of mustard oil glycosides with aliphatic side chains and their derivatives in rapeseed and other Brassica species. The study suggests that a specific gene locus determines side-chain length, with methionine chain elongation likely producing glucoiberverine (C_{3}), glucoerucin (C_{4}), and glucoberteroin (C_{5}). These compounds serve as precursors to compounds with sulfoxide or alkene side chains. For C_{5} side chains, this includes glucoalyssin and glucobrassicanapin.

== Properties ==
As a mustard oil glycoside, glucoalyssin can release a corresponding isothiocyanate, alyssin.
