= International Rutabaga Curling Championship =

Annual root vegetable event in New York

The International Rutabaga Curling Championship takes place annually at the Ithaca Farmers' Market, New York State, on the last day of the market season, which is typically the third weekend in December.

== History ==
The International Rutabaga Curling Championship started spontaneously in December 1997. Vendors at the Ithaca Farmers' Market began rolling their wares down the main aisle with the intent to stay warm; vendors did not discriminate about what they threw, and even frozen chickens were utilized. Rules have since been developed by Steve Sierigk, the High Commissioner of the International Rutabaga Curling Championship.

Because the Ithaca Farmers' Market is a food sales operation and thus classified as an essential business, it was allowed to hold the championship in 2020, one of the few events to be held in-person during the COVID-19 pandemic in New York State. Contestants that year were limited to market vendors, with in-person spectating also severely limited.

== Rules ==
- The court is drawn within the confines of the market midway, composed of roughly flat, wooden planks. The pitch is generally around 79 feet with a circular target at the far end (see curling for a graphical representation of a similar target). Once a rutabaga has been thrown it shall lie on the field of play until all other contestants in that section have rolled. Thrown rutabagas are subject to being knocked by subsequent rolls.
- Contestants are divided into three sections, each competing within themselves. The top three finishers of each section qualify for the championship round. The top three contestants in that round are awarded gold, silver, and bronze medals, along with eternal glory, honor, and fame.
- Only rutabagas are allowed to be used in the competition. Turnips, any other variety of root vegetable, or member of the Cruciferae family will not be permitted. (An exception was made in the 2005 championships to allow the use of turnips. The emergency rule change was necessary because the official rutabagas were frozen and unavailable for use.) Contestants are encouraged to supply their own rutabagas, though vendors may be on hand to provide suitable rutabagas for competition. Modification of the rutabaga is acceptable so long as the rutabaga is always able to roll on every axis.

== Winners ==
Year	First place	Second place	Third place
1997	No records kept.	Not recorded	
1998 (30 athletes)	Ricardo Macareno (The GOAT?)	Not recorded	Not recorded
1999 (50 athletes)	Amy Hnatko (Vender)	Jamin Uticone (Seneca Falls)	Sarah Highland (Ithaca)
2000	Laura Barros (Ithaca)	Not recorded	Not recorded
2001	James Neiderhardt (Sacred Seed Farm)	Random woman from the West Coast	Christi Sobel (Vender)
2002 (75 athletes)	David Tregaskis	Jane North	Mark Tucker
2003	Laura Whiting (Scottish Nat'ls)	Tom "Darth Baga" Torello	Jerry Waid
2004	Eric Nicholson	-	Harminder "The Beast"
2005 (120 athletes)	Kevin Waskelis (Team Culicious)	Rena Grossman (Team Curlicious)	Karen Hollands (Scottish Nat'ls)
2006	Artemis Inzinnia (18 months old)	Ray Schlather (an Ithacan adult)	Gavin “The Gavinator” (3 yrs old)
2007	Adele Lawless (9 yrs old)	Paul Sopor	Dru Santiago
2008 (First yr Rutabaga Chorus!)	Tom "Mantooth" Mansell	Ray Schlather (2nd medal)	David Kingsbury
2009	Lauretta "Hot and Spicy" Dolch	Steve Paisley	Andy Poshadel
2010	Nate Nicholson	Christi Sobel (2nd medal)	Sam Moody
2011 (very cold)	Steve Paisley (2nd medal)	James Harrod (10 yrs old)	Michael Glos (Farmer)
2012	Dave Townsend	“Mr. Sushi from Japan”	"Ethan's Big Ash Rutabaga"
2013	Matt Christian	Tom McCulloch	Thomas Carter Nicholson
2014	Todd Stein (Ithaca)	Jeremy Betterly (MA)	Kevin Luke (Cornell)
2015	Mychael "Chew-Baga" Seubert	Hilary Lucas - Ithaca League of Women Rollers	Jane "Freya the Viking Goddess" Kress
2016	Hannah “I [Heart] Brassicas” Swegarden	Dawn “Awesome Veggie-Inspired Gnome Hat” Grover	Michael “God” Gloss!
2017	Jim "Hop-along" Meehan	Kaylie Crawford	"Bloody Mary" from the North Pole
2019	Molly Dietz	John Giblin	Andy Borum
2020	(covid mess)	-	-
2021	Leo Gulepa	Andrais Crane	Mark “Skull” Tucker
2022	John "Bear" Harloff clawed his way with a come-from-behind throw!	Melissa D "Big Mama"	Corbin "Rusted Rutabaga" Streett
2023	Emily Brewer - Team SWIFTIE	Scott Riess	Josephine Walsh
2024	Henry Tompkins (Team Coverfield Bridge)	JT Tompkins (Team Coverfield Bridge)	Michael Vega

Starting in 2022, a new award was established for an athlete who the referees considered to have gone "above and beyond" for the sport, called the "Refs' Choice Award" and determined by unanimous decision by the referees.

Year	Winner
2022	The CURL GIRLS Cheerleaders
2023	CHEWBAGA (Former gold medal 2015)
2024	Female athlete dressed in red who danced for much of the event
