= Rutabaga =

Root vegetable in the Brassica family

Rutabaga or Swede
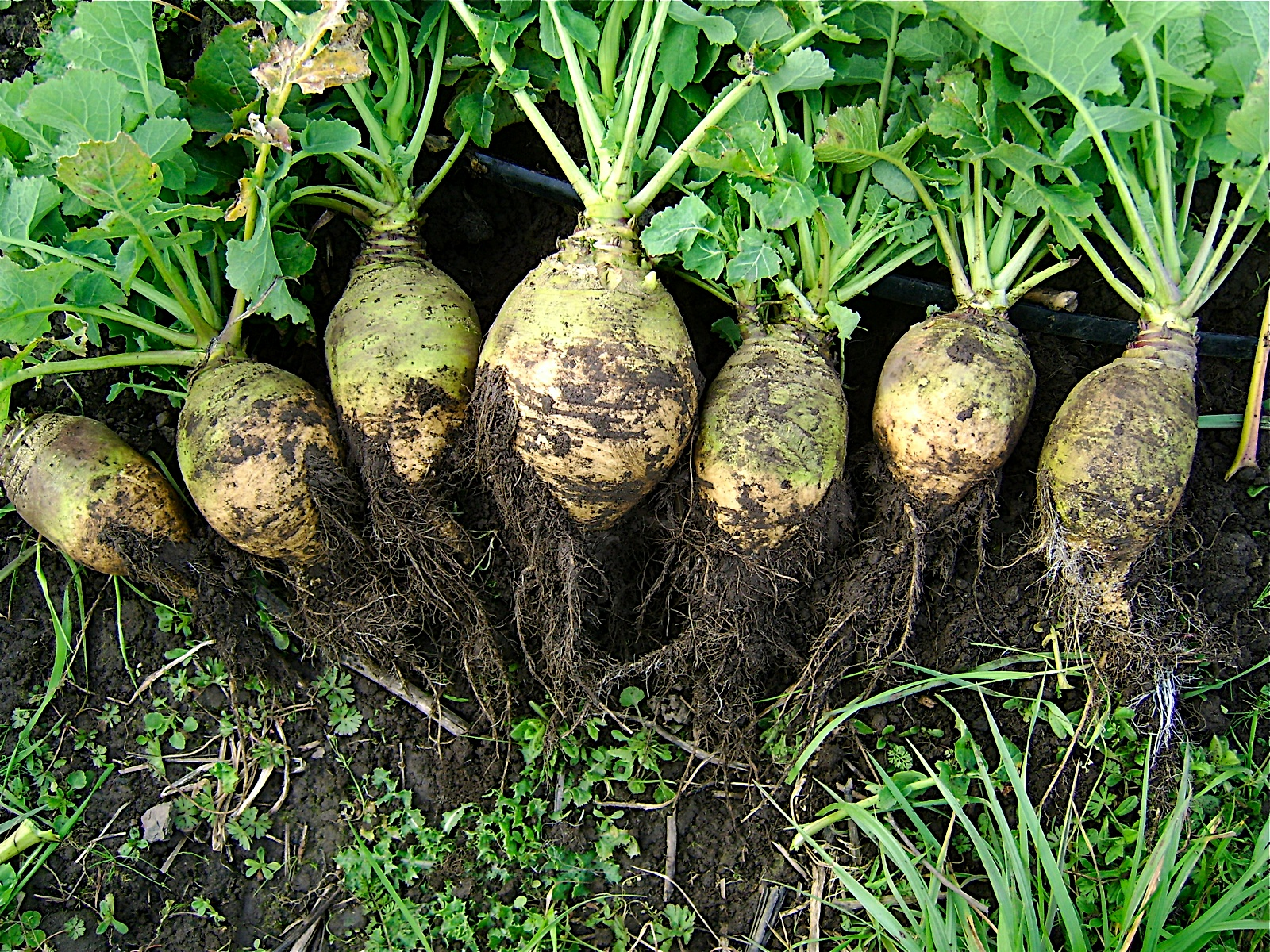
- Rutabaga or Swede
- Species: Brassica napus
- Cultivar group: Napobrassica Group

Rutabaga (/ˈruːtəbeɪɡə/ ROO-tə-bay-gə; North American English) or swede (British English and some Commonwealth English) is a root vegetable, a form of Brassica napus (which also includes rapeseed). Other names include Swedish turnip, neep (Scots), and turnip (Scottish and Canadian English, Irish English, Cornish English and Manx English, as well as some dialects of English in Northern England, New England English, and Australian English). However, elsewhere, the name turnip usually refers to the related white turnip.

The species B. napus originated as a hybrid between the cabbage (B. oleracea) and the turnip (B. rapa). Rutabaga roots are eaten as human food in various ways, and the leaves can be eaten as a leaf vegetable. The roots and tops are also used for livestock, fed directly in the winter or foraged in the field during the other seasons.

== Etymology ==
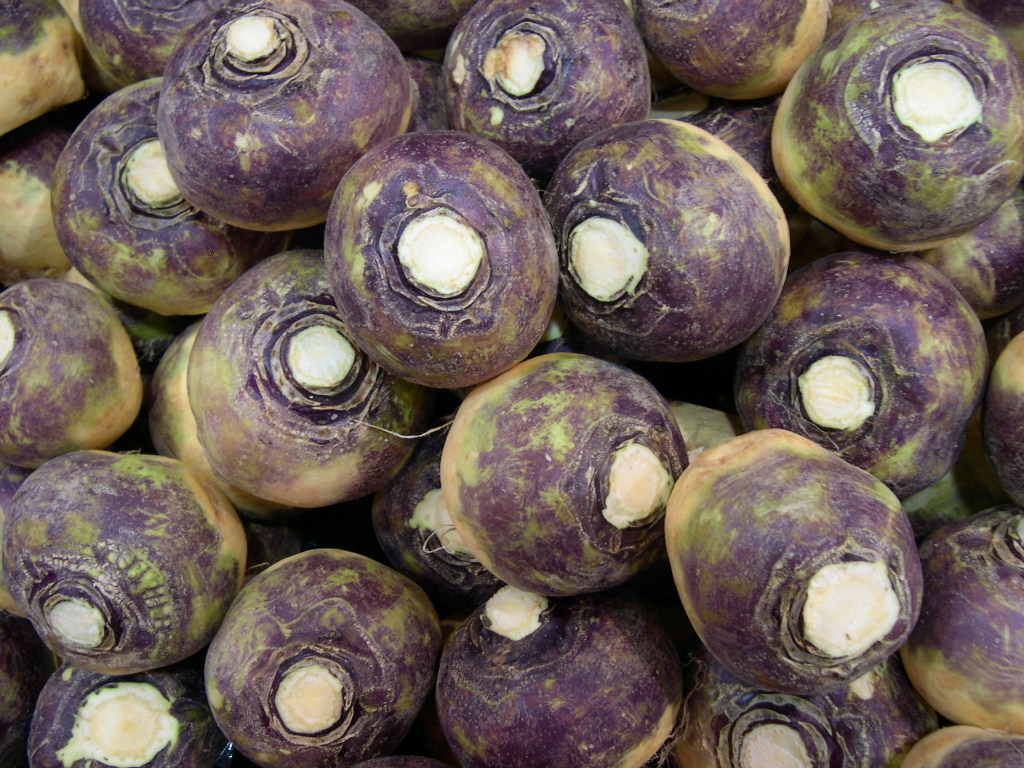
Harvested roots

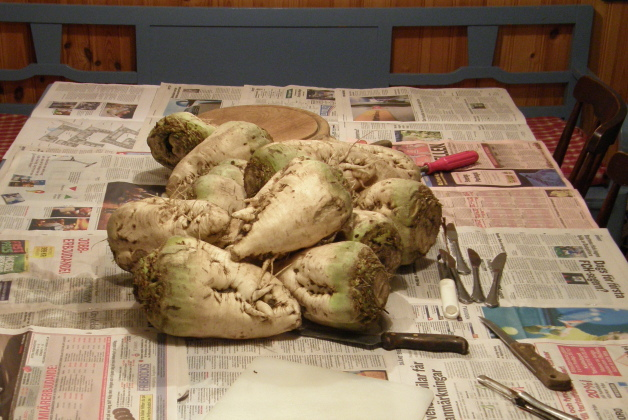
Harvested roots waiting to be prepared

Rutabaga has many national and regional names. Rutabaga is the common North American term for the plant. This comes from the Swedish dialectal word rotabagge, from rot, 'root' + bagge, 'lump, bunch'. In the U.S., the plant is also known as Swedish turnip or yellow turnip.

The term swede (from "Swedish turnip") is used in many Commonwealth Nations, including much of the United Kingdom, Australia, and New Zealand. The name turnip is also used in parts of Northern and Midland England, the West Country (particularly Cornwall), Ireland, the Isle of Man, and Canada. In Wales, according to region, it is variously known as meipen, rwden, or erfinen in Welsh, and as swede or turnip in English.

In Scotland, it is known as turnip, tumshie (also used as a pejorative term for a foolish or stupid person), or neep (from Old English næp, Latin napus). Some areas of south-east Scotland, such as Berwickshire and Roxburghshire, still use the term baigie, possibly a derivative of the Swedish dialectal word rotabagge. The term turnip is also used for the white turnip (Brassica rapa ssp rapa).

Some will also refer to both swede and (white) turnip as just turnip (this word is also derived from næp). In north-east England, turnips and swedes are colloquially called snannies, snadgers, snaggers (archaic) or narkies. Rutabaga is also known as moot in the Isle of Man and the Manx language word for turnip is napin.

== History ==
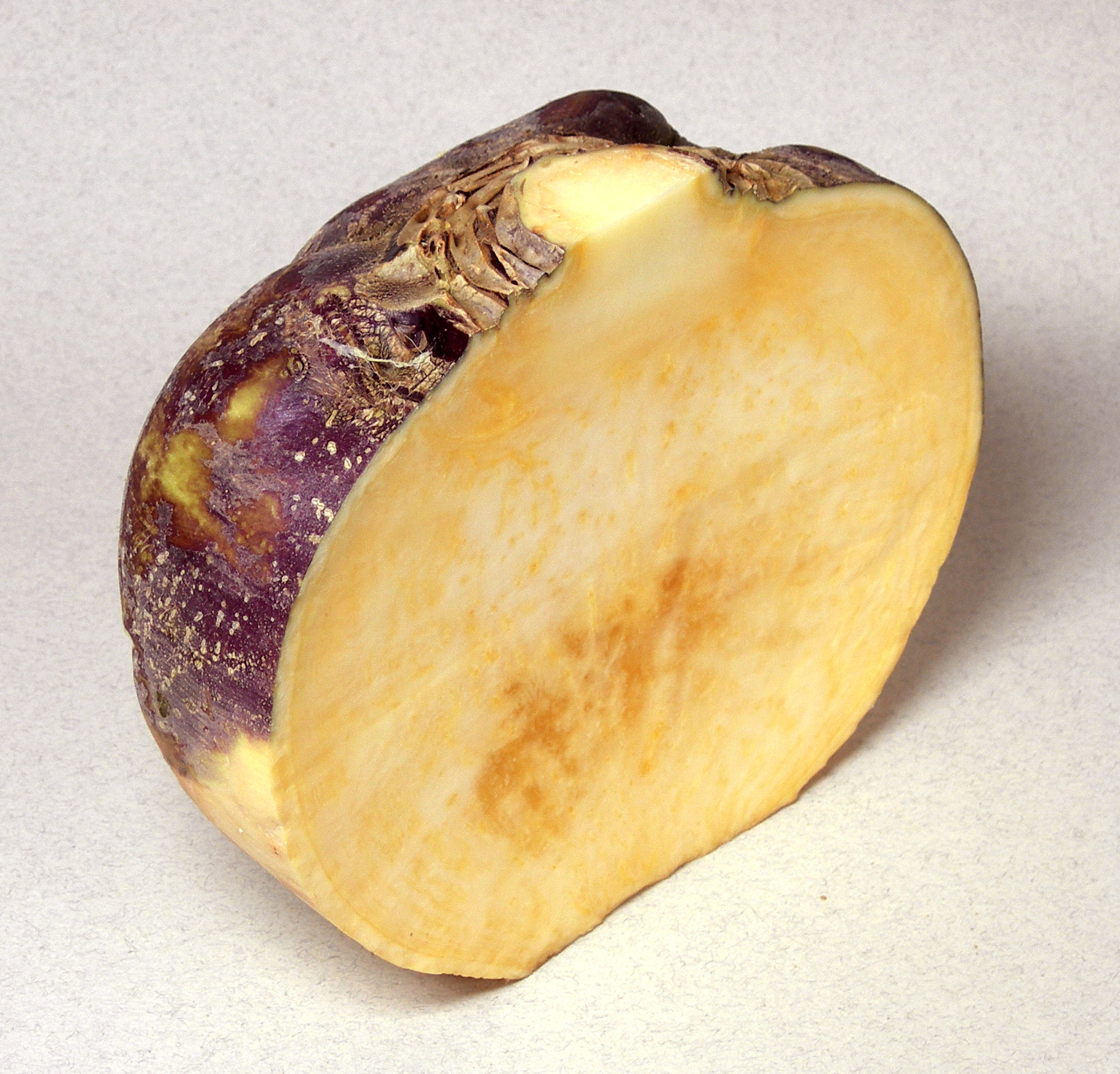
Longitudinal section of a root

The first known printed reference to the rutabaga comes from the Swiss botanist Gaspard Bauhin in 1620, where he notes that it was growing wild in Sweden. It is often considered to have originated in Scandinavia, Finland or Russia. According to the Natural Resources Institute Finland (now Luke), rutabaga or lanttu was most likely bred on more than one occasion in Northern Europe around the 16th century. Studies by its research institute have shown that lanttu was developed independently in Finland and Sweden from turnip and cabbage in connection with seed cultivation. There are contradictory accounts of how rutabaga arrived in England. Some sources say it arrived in England from Germany, while other accounts support Swedish origins. According to John Sinclair, the root vegetable arrived in England from Germany around 1750. Rutabaga arrived in Scotland by way of Sweden around 1781.

An article in The Gardeners' Chronicle suggests that the rutabaga was introduced more widely to England in 1790. Introduction to North America came in the early 19th century with reports of rutabaga crops in Illinois as early as 1817. In 1835, a rutabaga fodder crop was recommended to New York farmers in the Genesee River valley.

Rutabaga was considered a food of last resort in both Germany and France due to its association with food shortages in World War I and World War II. Boiled stew with rutabaga and water as the only ingredients (Steckrübeneintopf) was a typical food in Germany during the famines and food shortages of World War I caused by the Allied blockade (the Steckrübenwinter or Turnip Winter of 1916–17) and between 1945 and 1949. As a result, many older Germans had unhappy memories of this food.

=== Botanical history ===
Rutabaga has a complex taxonomic history. The earliest account comes from the Swiss botanist Gaspard Bauhin, who wrote about it in his 1620 Prodromus. Brassica napobrassica was first validly published by Carl Linnaeus in his 1753 work Species Plantarum as a variety of B. oleracea: B. oleracea var. napobrassica. It has since been moved to other taxa as a variety, subspecies, or elevated to species rank. In 1768, a Scottish botanist promoted Linnaeus' variety to species rank as Brassica napobrassica in The Gardeners Dictionary.

Rutabaga has a chromosome number of 2n = 38. It originated from a cross between Brassica rapa (turnip) and Brassica oleracea (wild cabbage). The resulting cross doubled its chromosomes, becoming an allopolyploid. This relationship was first published by Woo Jang-choon in 1935 and is known as the Triangle of U.

== Cuisine ==
=== Europe ===
==== Netherlands ====
In the Netherlands, rutabaga is traditionally served boiled and mashed. Adding mashed potatoes (and, in some recipes, similarly mashed vegetables or fruits) makes stamppot 'mash pot', a dish often served alongside smoked sausage. Similar dishes are known in the southern low countries, down to and including Brussels, as stoemp.

==== Poland ====
During World War II, rutabaga and rutabaga juice were an important part of the local diet, and were consumed in large quantities.

==== Scandinavia ====
===== Sweden and Norway =====
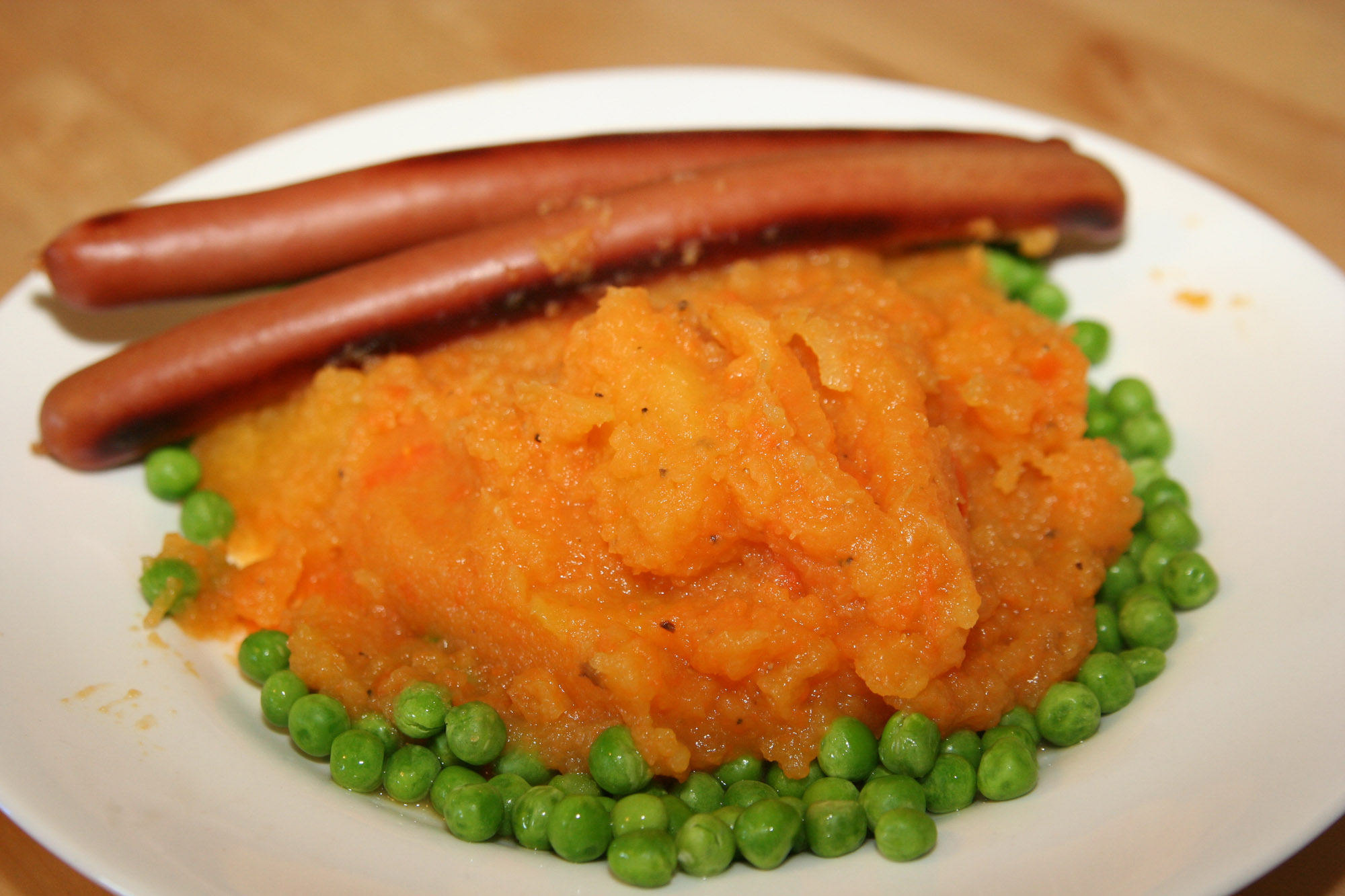
Rotmos served with sausage

In Sweden and Norway, rutabaga is cooked with potato and sometimes carrot, and mashed with butter and either stock or, occasionally, milk or cream, to create a puree called rotmos (Swedish, literally 'root mash') or kålrabistappe (Norwegian). Onion is occasionally added. In Norway, kålrabistappe is an obligatory accompaniment to many festive dishes, including smalahove, pinnekjøtt, raspeball and salted herring. In Sweden, rotmos is often eaten together with cured and boiled ham hock, accompanied by mustard. This classic Swedish dish is called fläsklägg med rotmos.

===== Finland =====
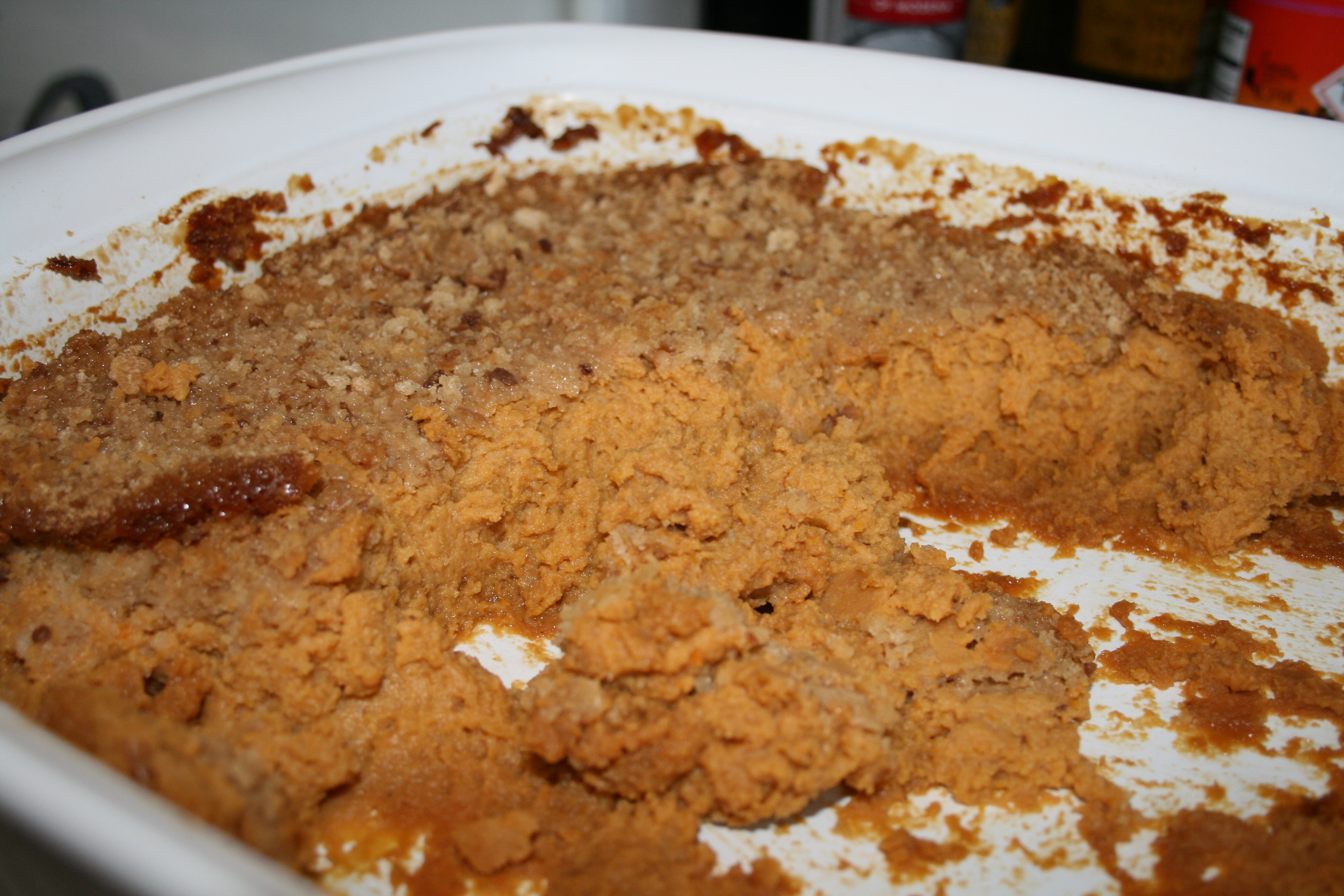
Lanttulaatikko

Finns eat and cook rutabaga in a variety of ways. Rutabaga is the major ingredient in the popular Christmas dish lanttulaatikko (rutabaga casserole), one of the three main casseroles served during Finnish Christmas, alongside the potato and carrot casseroles.

Uncooked and thinly julienned rutabaga is often served as a side dish salad in school and workplace lunches. Raisins or canned pineapple in light syrup are often added to the rutabaga salad. Sometimes, thinly sliced raw carrots are mixed with rutabaga.

Finns use rutabaga in most dishes that call for a root vegetable. Many Finnish soup bases consist of potatoes, carrots, and rutabagas.

Finnish cuisine also roasts, bakes, boils, and grills rutabagas. Oven-baked root vegetables are another home-cooking classic in Finland: rutabaga, carrots, beetroots, and potatoes are roasted in the oven with salt and oil. Karelian hot pot (karjalanpaisti) is a popular slow-cooking stew with root vegetables and meat cooked for a long time in a Dutch oven.

Finnish supermarkets sell alternative potato chips made from root vegetables, such as rutabagas, beetroots and carrots.

Rutabagas are also an ingredient in lanttukukko (rutabaga-kukko, a traditional Savonian and Karelian dish).

==== United Kingdom ====
===== England =====
In England, swede is boiled with carrots and mashed or pureed with butter and ground pepper. The flavoured cooking water is often retained for soup or as an addition to gravy. Swede is also a component of the popular condiment Branston Pickle. The swede is also one of the four traditional ingredients of the pasty originating in Cornwall.

===== Scotland =====
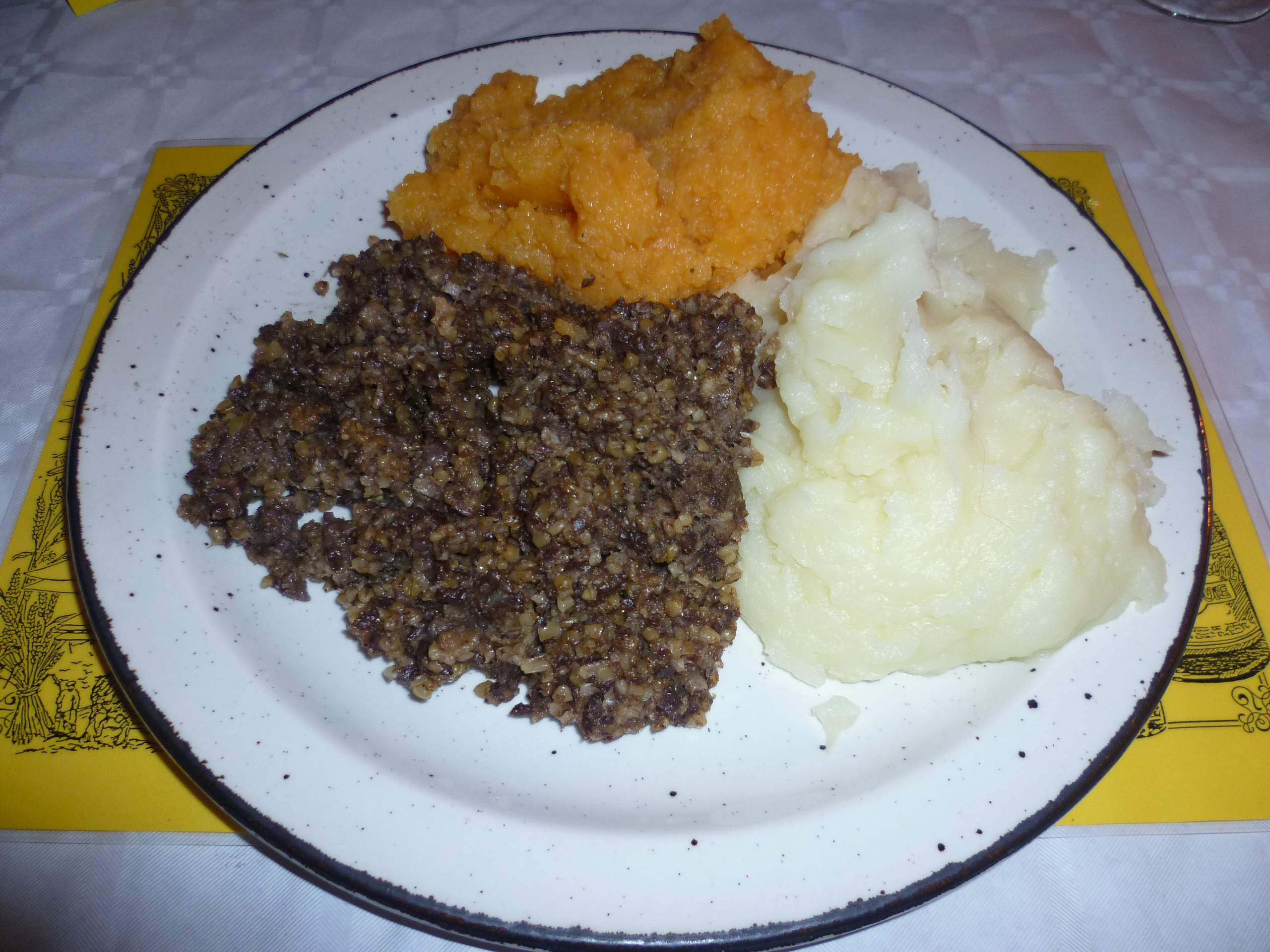
Haggis served with neeps and tatties

In Scotland, separately boiled and mashed, swede (neeps) and potatoes are served as "neeps and tatties" (tatties being the Scots word for potatoes), in a traditional Burns supper, together with the main course of haggis (the Scottish national dish). Neeps mashed with potatoes are called clapshot. Roughly equal quantities of neeps and tatties are boiled in salted water and mashed with butter. Seasoning can be augmented with black pepper. Onions are never used. Regionally, neeps are a common ingredient in soups and stews.

===== Wales =====
Swede is an essential vegetable component of the traditional Welsh lamb broth called cawl. A mash produced using just potato and swede is known as ponsh maip in the North-East of the country, as mwtrin on the Llyn peninsula and as stwnsh rwden in other parts.

=== Outside Europe ===
==== Australia ====
In Australia, swedes are used as a flavour enhancer in casseroles, stews, and soups.

==== Canada ====
In Canada, they are considered winter vegetables, as, along with similar vegetables, they can be kept in a cold area or cellar for several months. They are primarily used as a side dish. In Newfoundland, it is served with Jiggs dinner, and often included in soups, stews, and meat pies.

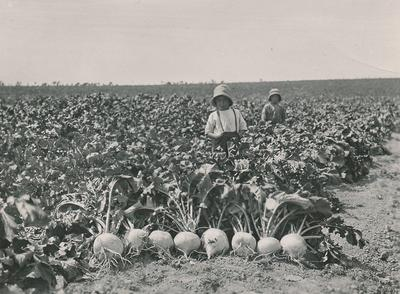
Children helping harvest turnip and swede in Ōpaki, New Zealand

==== New Zealand ====
In New Zealand, they are more commonly available in winter but can be easily purchased for much of the year. It is thought they best grow in Southland, where the winters are colder. They are usually served mashed with butter but are often added to other dishes like casseroles or bakes.

==== United States ====
In the US, rutabagas are cubed and boiled with smoked meats in the southeast. Rutabagas may also be used as an ingredient as part of stews or casseroles, served mashed with carrots, or baked in a pasty. They are sometimes included in the New England boiled dinner. In the Upper Peninsula of Michigan, pasties are a ubiquitous regional dish. They consist of diced or ground beef together with diced potato, diced rutabaga, onion and seasonings wrapped in pastry in a turnover shape and baked.

== Phytochemistry ==
Rutabaga, raw
Nutritional value per 100 g (3.5 oz)
- Energy: 157 kJ (38 kcal)
- Carbohydrates: 8.62 g
- Sugars: 4.46 g
- Dietary fiber: 2.3 g
- Fat: 0.16 g
- Protein: 1.08 g
Vitamins and minerals
Vitamins	Quantity %DV^{†}
Thiamine (B1)	8% 0.09 mg
Riboflavin (B2)	3% 0.04 mg
Niacin (B3)	4% 0.7 mg
Pantothenic acid (B5)	3% 0.16 mg
Vitamin B6	6% 0.1 mg
Folate (B9)	5% 21 μg
Vitamin C	28% 25 mg
Minerals	Quantity %DV^{†}
Calcium	3% 43 mg
Iron	2% 0.44 mg
Magnesium	5% 20 mg
Manganese	6% 0.131 mg
Phosphorus	4% 53 mg
Potassium	10% 305 mg
Zinc	2% 0.24 mg
- Link to USDA Database entry
- ^{†}Percentages estimated using US recommendations for adults, except for potassium, which is estimated based on expert recommendation from the National Academies.

Rutabaga and other cyanoglucoside-containing foods (including cassava, maize (corn), bamboo shoots, sweet potatoes, and lima beans) release cyanide, which is subsequently detoxified into thiocyanate. Thiocyanate inhibits thyroid iodide transport and, at high doses, competes with iodide in the organification process within thyroid tissue. Goitres may develop when there is a dietary imbalance of thiocyanate-containing food in excess of iodine consumption, and these compounds can contribute to hypothyroidism. Yet, there have been no reports of ill effects in humans from the consumption of glucosinolates from normal amounts of Brassica vegetables. Glucosinolate content in Brassica vegetables is around one percent of dry matter. These compounds also cause the bitter taste of rutabaga.

As with watercress, mustard greens, turnip, broccoli, and horseradish, human perception of bitterness in rutabaga is governed by a gene affecting the TAS2R bitter receptor, which detects the glucosinolates in rutabaga. Sensitive individuals with the genotype PAV/PAV (supertasters) find rutabaga twice as bitter as insensitive subjects (AVI/AVI). The difference for the mixed type (PAV/AVI) is insignificant for rutabaga. As a result, sensitive individuals may find some rutabagas too bitter to eat.

Other chemical compounds that contribute to flavour and odour include glucocheirolin, glucobrassicanapin, glucoberteroin, gluconapoleiferin, and glucoerysolin. Several phytoalexins that aid in defence against plant pathogens have also been isolated from the rutabaga, including three novel phytoalexins that were reported in 2004.

Rutabaga contains significant amounts of vitamin C: 100 g contains 25 mg, 30% of the daily recommended dose.

== Other uses ==
=== Livestock ===
The roots and tops of "swedes" came into use as a forage crop in the early nineteenth century, used as winter feed for livestock. They may be fed directly (chopped or from a hopper), or animals may be allowed to forage the plants directly in the field.

=== Halloween ===
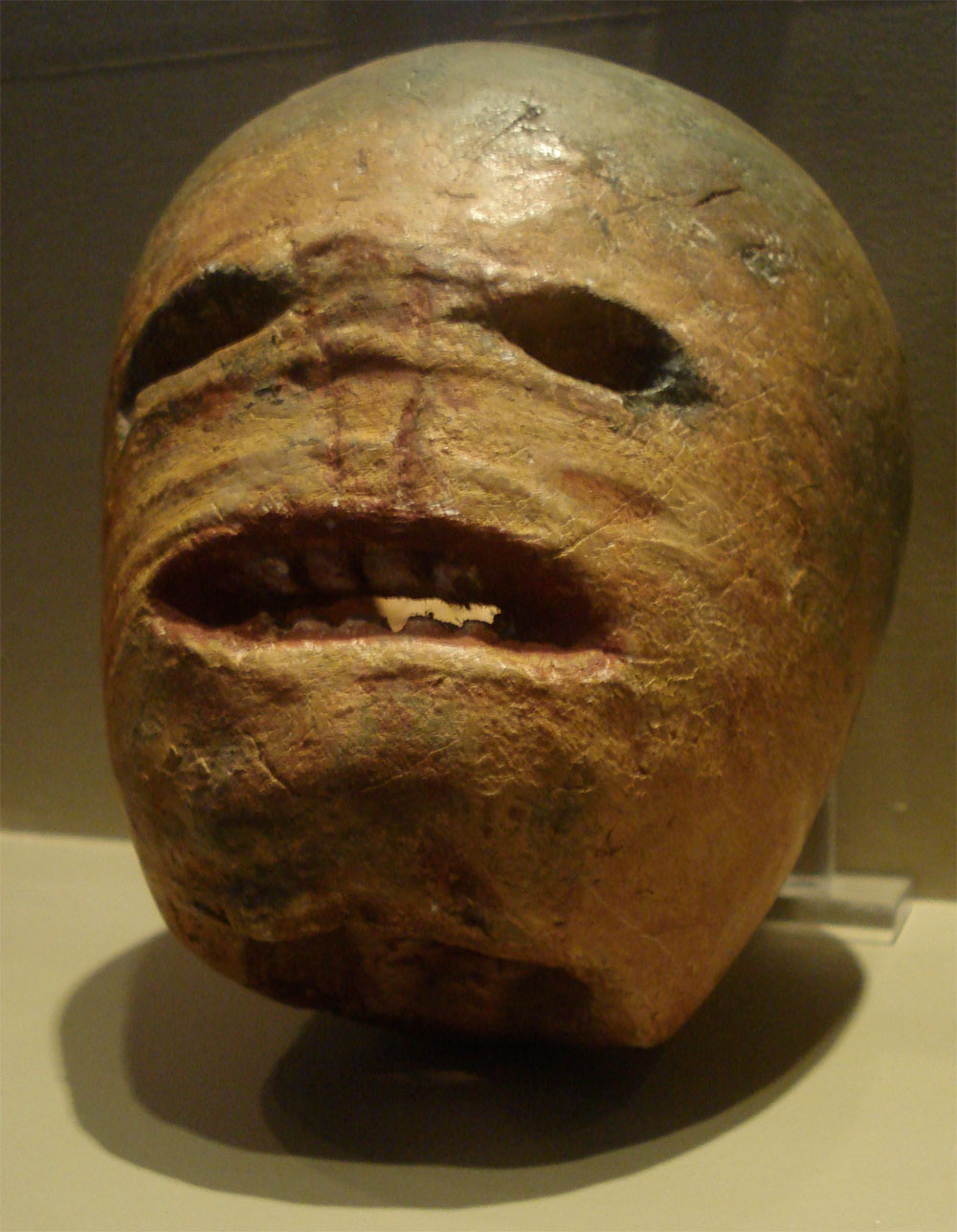
A traditional Irish Halloween turnip (rutabaga) lantern on display in the Museum of Country Life, Ireland

People in Northern England, West England, Ireland, and Scotland have long carved turnips and often use them as lanterns to ward off harmful spirits. In the Middle Ages, rowdy bands of children roamed the streets in masks carrying carved turnips known in Scotland as "tumshie heads". In modern times, turnips are often carved to look as sinister and threatening as possible and are put in the window or on the doorstep of a house on Halloween to ward off evil spirits.

Since pumpkins became readily available in Europe in the 1980s, they have taken over this role to a large extent. In the Isle of Man, turnip lanterns are still carved at Hop-tu-Naa (Manx equivalent of Halloween), lit with a candle or electric torch, and carried from house to house by some children, with the accompanying Hop tu Naa song; hoping for money or treats of food. The smell of burning turnip is an evocative part of the event.

=== Festivals ===
A local farmers' market in the town of Ithaca, New York, organizes what it calls the International Rutabaga Curling Championship annually on the last day of the market season. The villages of Askov, Minnesota, and Cumberland, Wisconsin, both hold annual rutabaga festivals in August.

== See also ==
- List of vegetables
