= Rundstück warm =

Warm slice of meat served in a halved roll

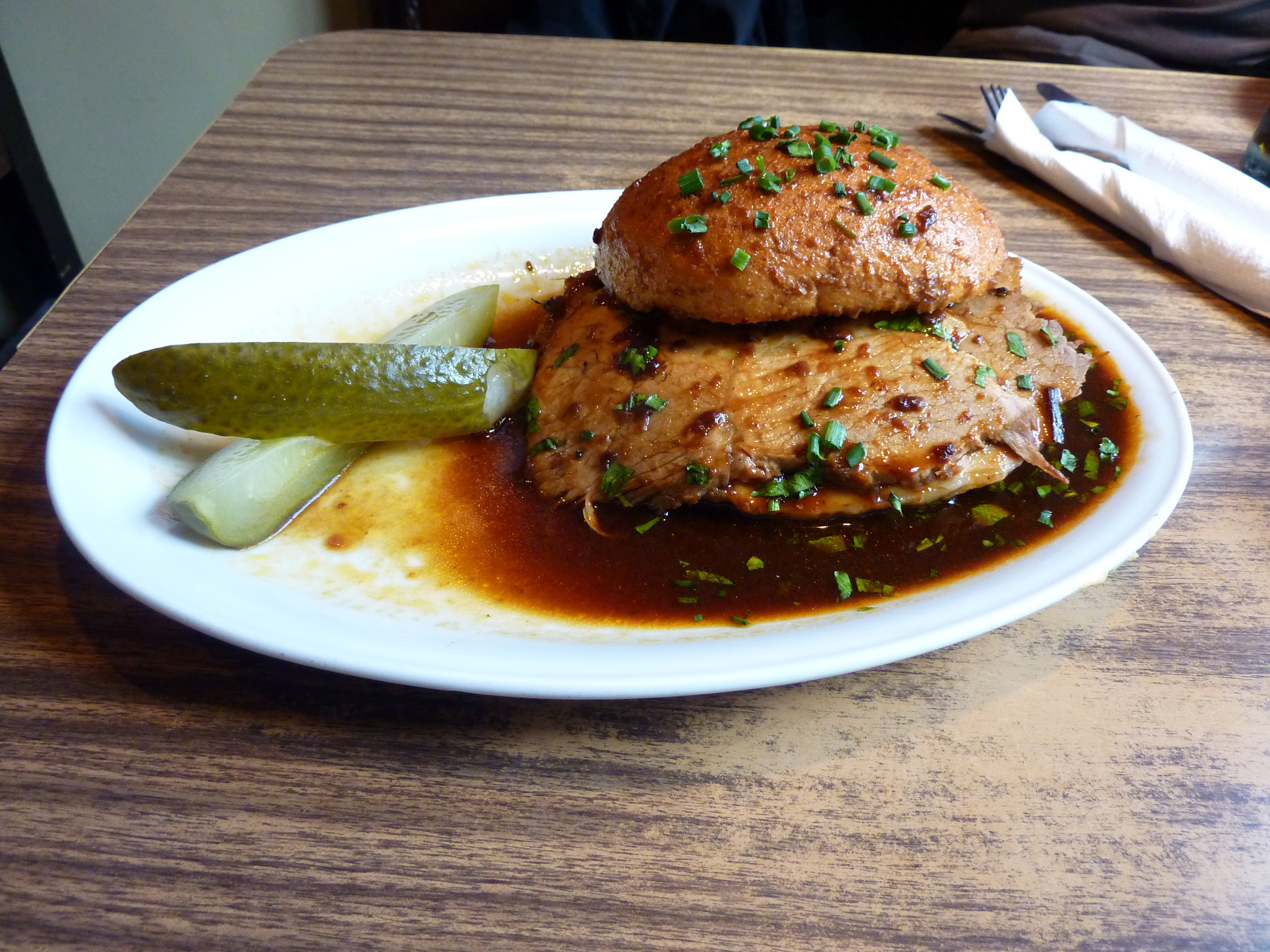
A rundstück warm in Hamburg, Germany

The rundstück warm (English: "round piece warm") is a hot dish consisting of a slice of warm roast beef or pork served between the slices of a halved round wheat roll, which is then doused with hot gravy. It is sometimes served with mustard and side dishes such as pickles or aspic from the roast stock.

== History ==
The original bread roll of Hamburg is called "Rundstück" (lit.: round piece) Those that were not eaten for breakfast were plated with slices of roasted pork, smothered in sauce and were then called "Rundstück warm". Earlier versions of the dish typically only included a bread roll underneath the meat.

It has been described as being "centuries old". It has been posited by some historians that the dish originated in Hamburg in the 17th century, when the round roll began to be purveyed in Hamburg. Following this, leftover pork and gravy from Sunday roasts were used to prepare the dish on Mondays.

It has been suggested that the rundstück warm may be a precursor to the hamburger, but ultimately, "food historians disagree on the modern burger’s origins". Some historians argue that the hamburger descends from the rundstück warm, while others believe that the hamburger originates from somewhere else.

It was a popular snack food in the early 20th century in Hamburg.

== See also ==
- Cuisine of Hamburg
- List of meat dishes
