= Ham hock =

Joint on the hog's leg between the ham and trotter

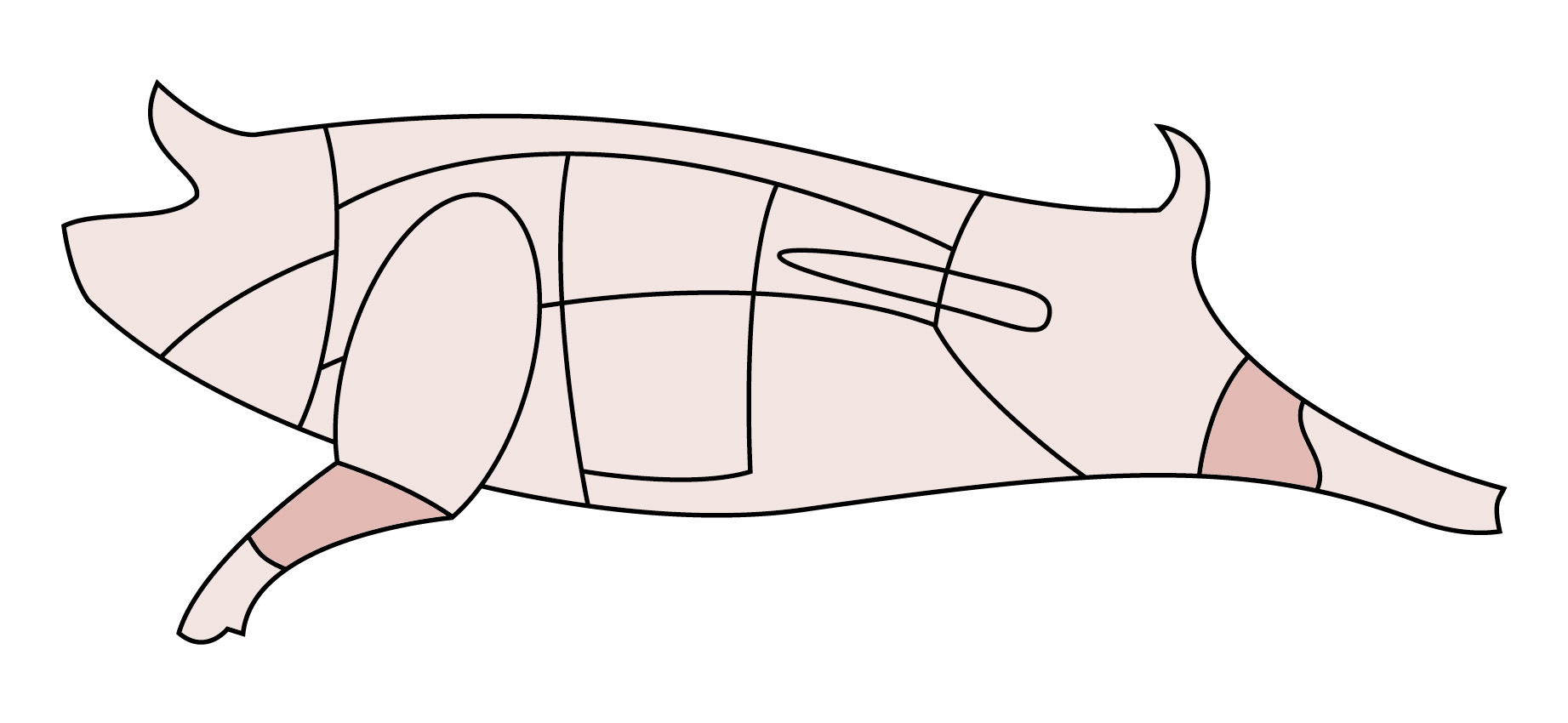
Ham hock position

A ham hock (or hough) or pork knuckle is the joint between the tibia/fibula and the metatarsals of the foot of a pig, where the foot was attached to the leg. It is the portion of the leg that is neither part of the ham proper nor the ankle or foot (trotter), but rather the extreme shank end of the leg bone.

== Uses ==
Since this piece generally consists of much skin, tendons and ligaments, it requires long cooking through stewing or braising to be made palatable. The cut of meat can be cooked with greens and other vegetables or in flavorful sauces. It is often added to soups, such as pea and ham soup, with the meat being added to the soup prior to serving. It can also be added to savoury pies. The meat of particularly meaty hocks may be removed and served as is. Ham hocks, like hog jowls (pigs' cheeks), add a distinctive flavor to various dishes. This is particularly true for collard greens, mustard greens, cabbage, green beans, and navy beans.

Ham hocks are essential ingredients for the distinct flavor in soul food and other forms of American Southern country cooking. In the Appalachian Mountains, it is common to add ham hocks along with chopped onion and spices to pots of pinto beans to make the meal more hearty. In the Mid-Atlantic States, in rural regions settled by the Pennsylvania Dutch, hocks are a commonly used ingredient for making a kind of meat loaf called scrapple. Eisbein is the name of the joint in north German, and at the same time the name of a dish of roasted ham hock, called Schweinshaxe in Bavaria, Stelze in Austria, and Wädli in Switzerland. The dish is very popular in Poland, using this cut. The dish is also popular in the Czech Republic, where it is most popular in Ostrava, close to the Polish border. It is the most popular dish in Polish-Czech Silesia, where it is served in a soup made from sauerkraut called Golonka (Czech: Vepřové koleno). Ham hocks are also popular when boiled with escarole, more commonly called endives, in Italian-American cuisine. Fläsklägg med rotmos is a Swedish dish consisting of cured ham hocks and a mash of rutabaga and potatoes, served with sweet mustard. In Canada, and particularly Montreal, ham hocks are referred to as "pigs' knuckles" and are served in bistros and taverns with baked beans. In northern Italy ham hocks are referred to as stinco, and are often served roast whole with sauerkraut. In the UK ham hocks are used to make soup.

== Gallery ==
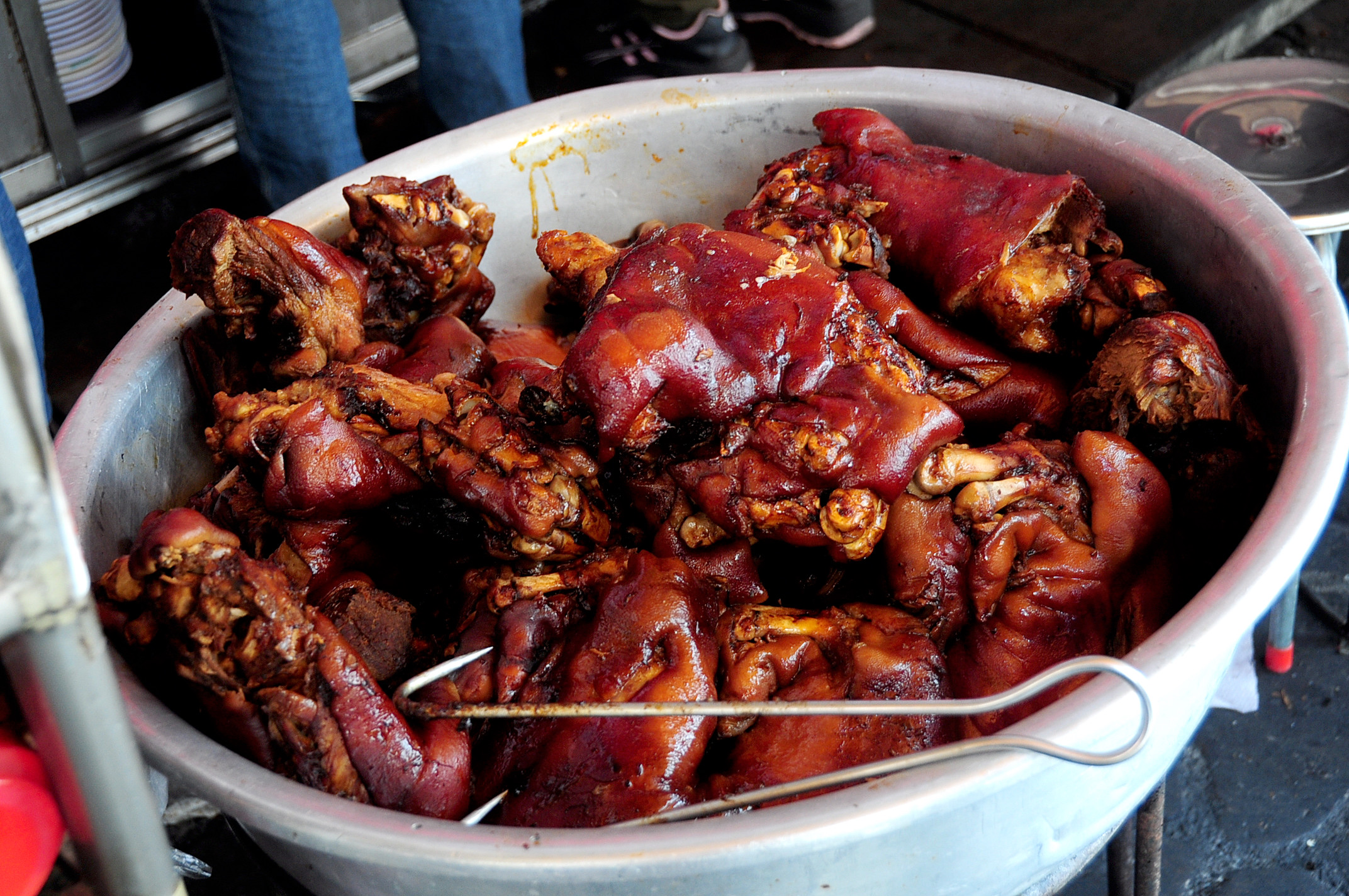
Wanluan pork knuckle – a Taiwanese dish wherein the meat is simmered in a broth flavored with dozens of spices and traditional medicinal herbs, including star anise and cinnamon.

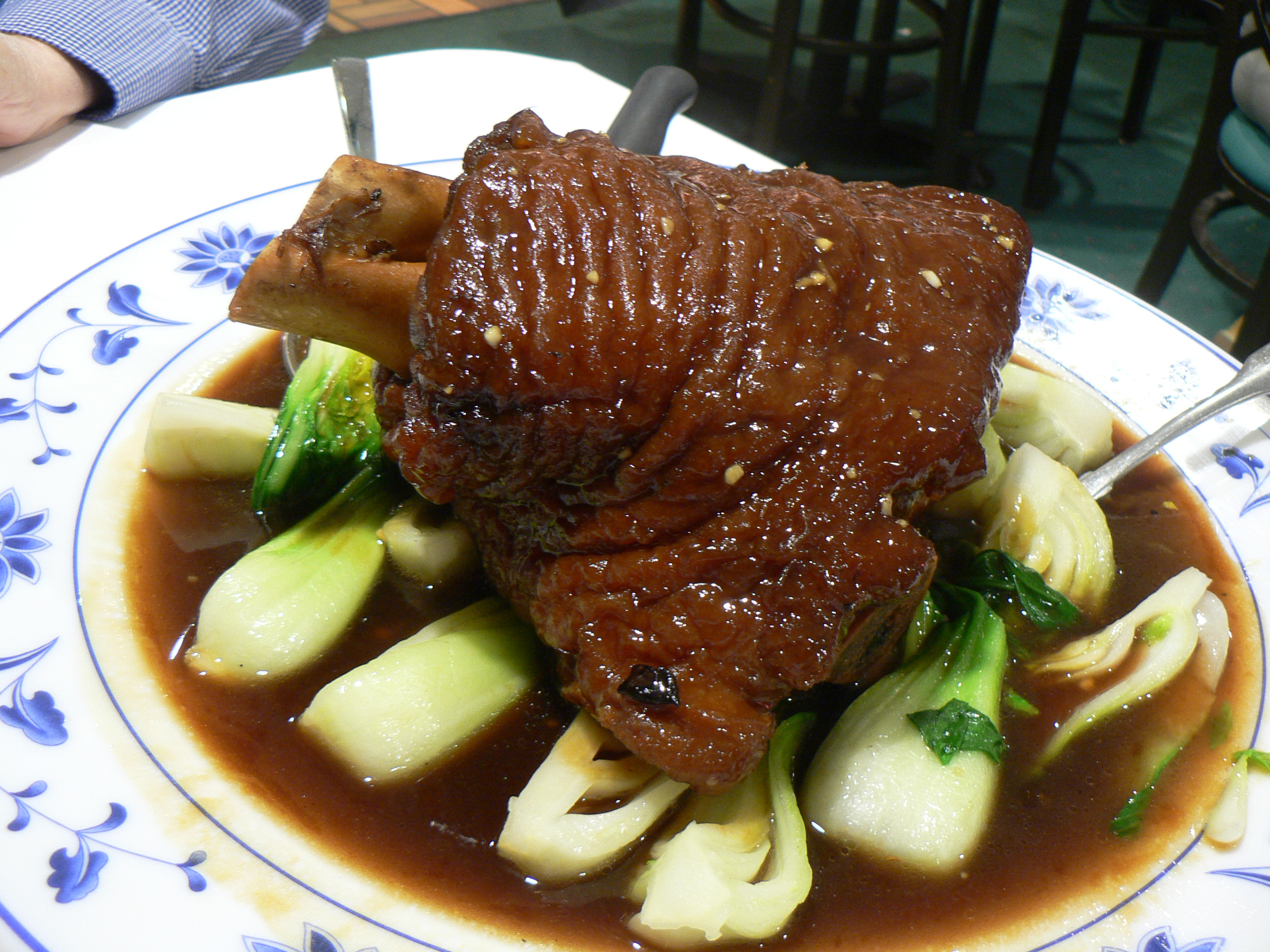
Chinese-style ham hock with bok choy in gravy

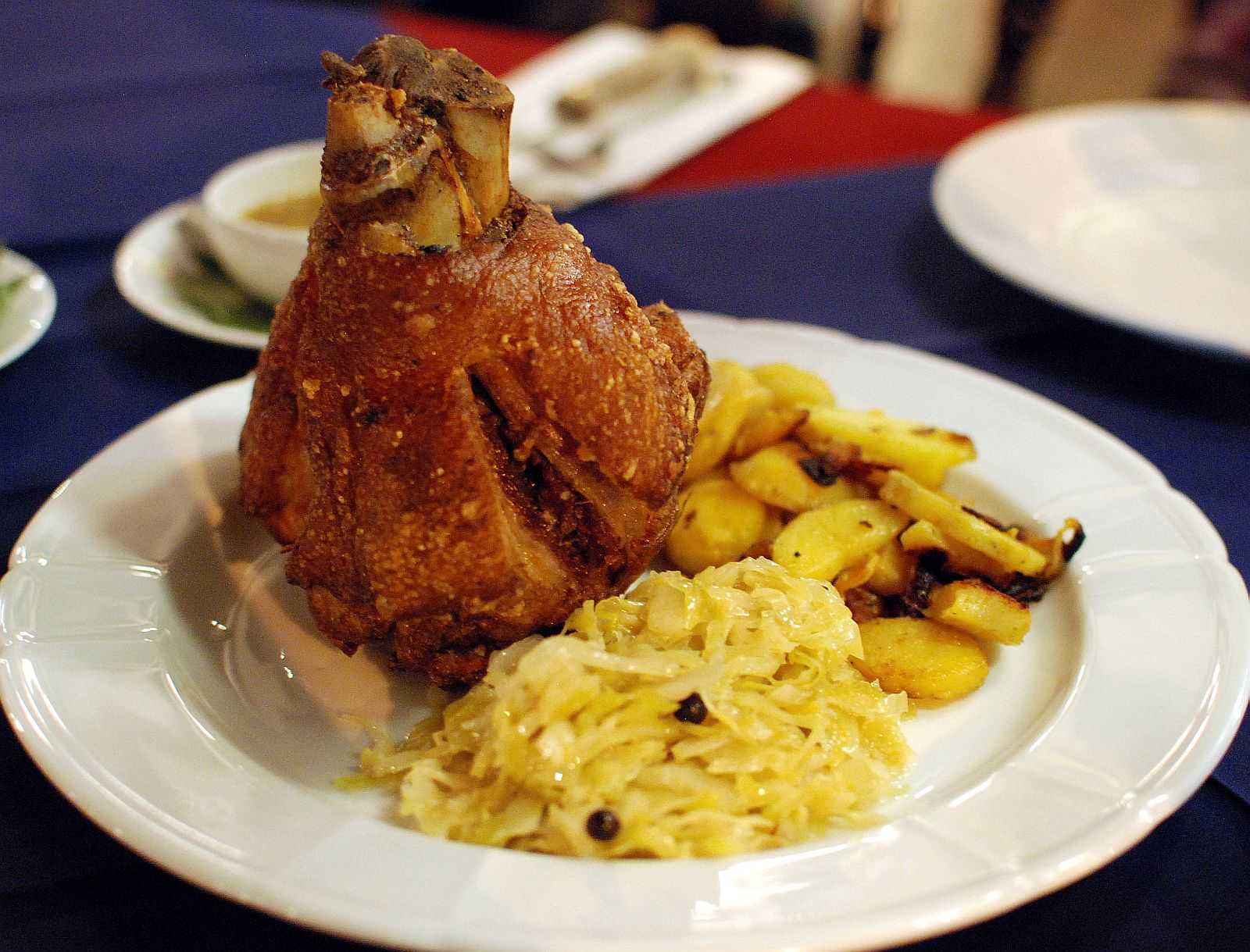
Schweinshaxe served with roasted potatoes (Bratkartoffeln) and Sauerkraut at a Bavarian restaurant in Chiang Mai, Thailand

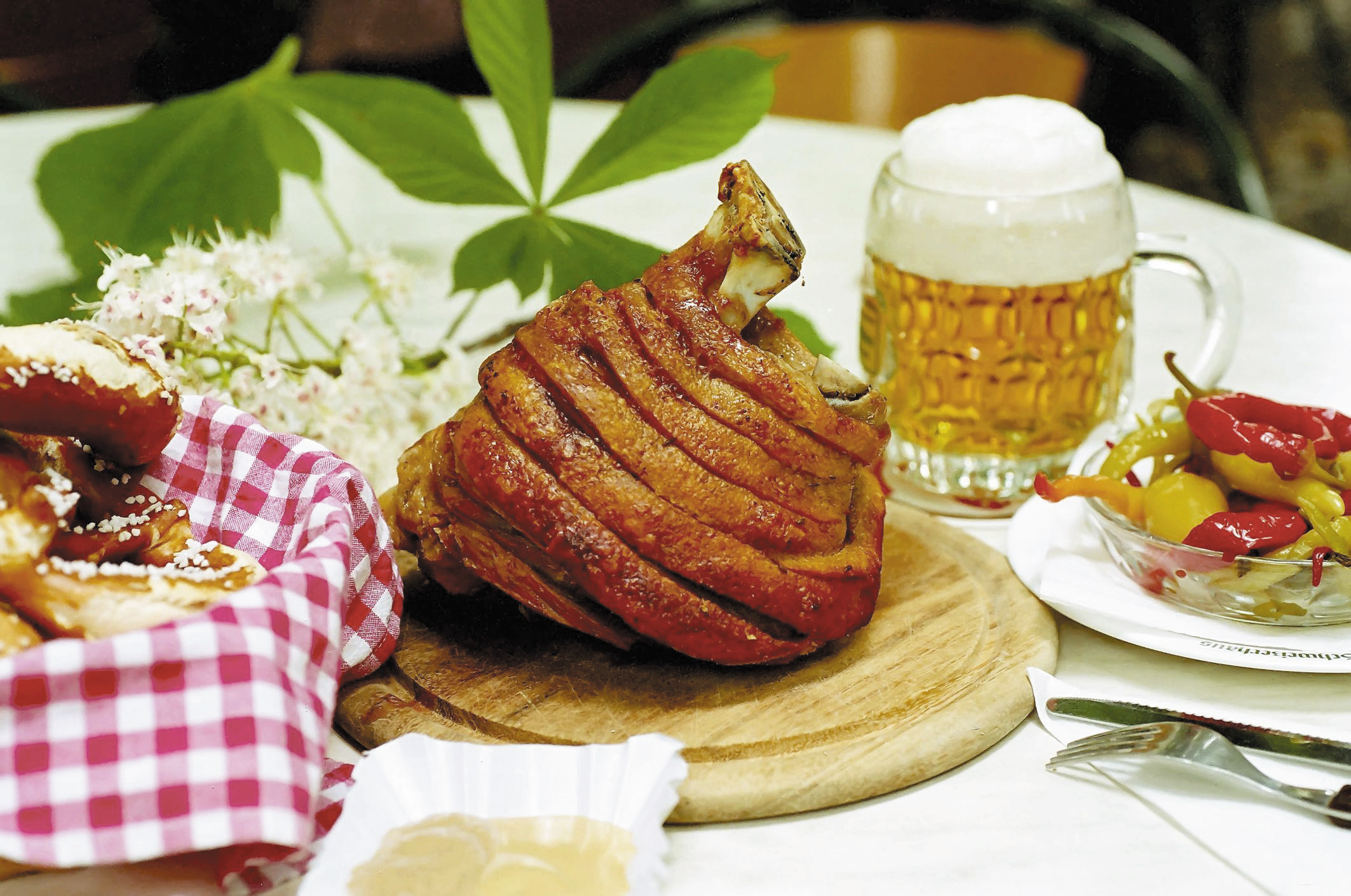
Roasted Austrian style Stelze

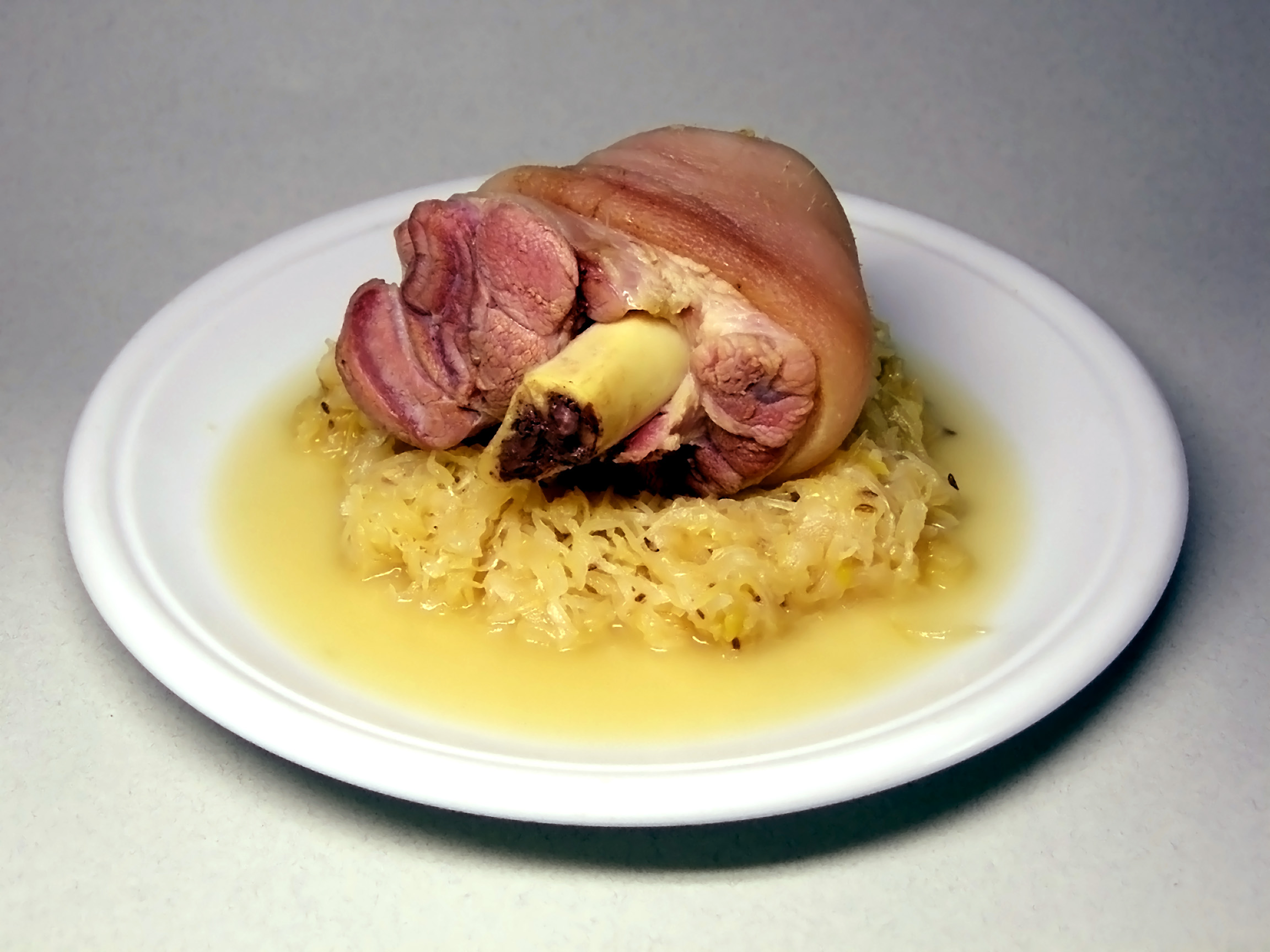
Pickled Eisbein with Sauerkraut

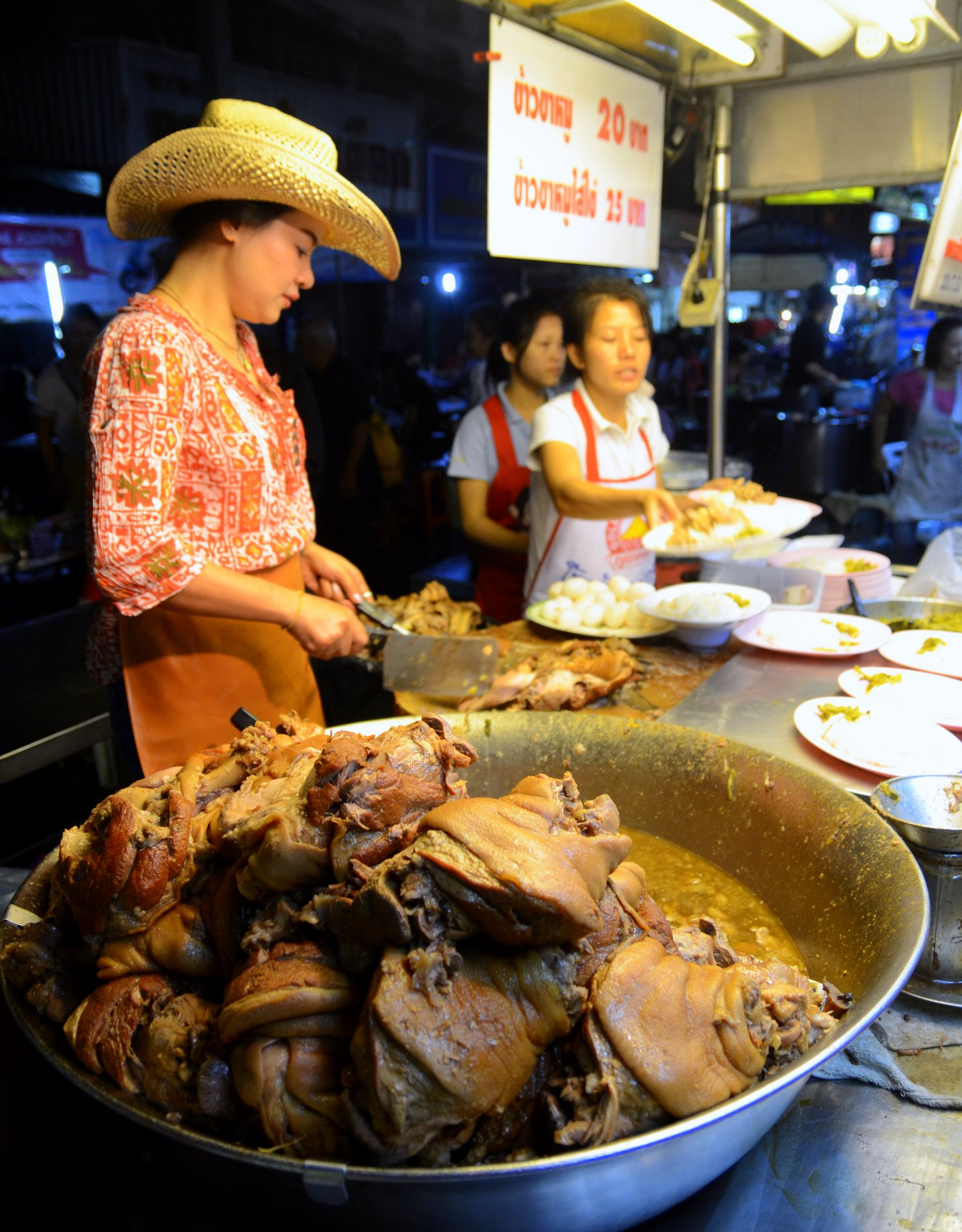
Ham hocks stewed in soy sauce and five-spice powder at a street stall in Chiang Mai, Thailand

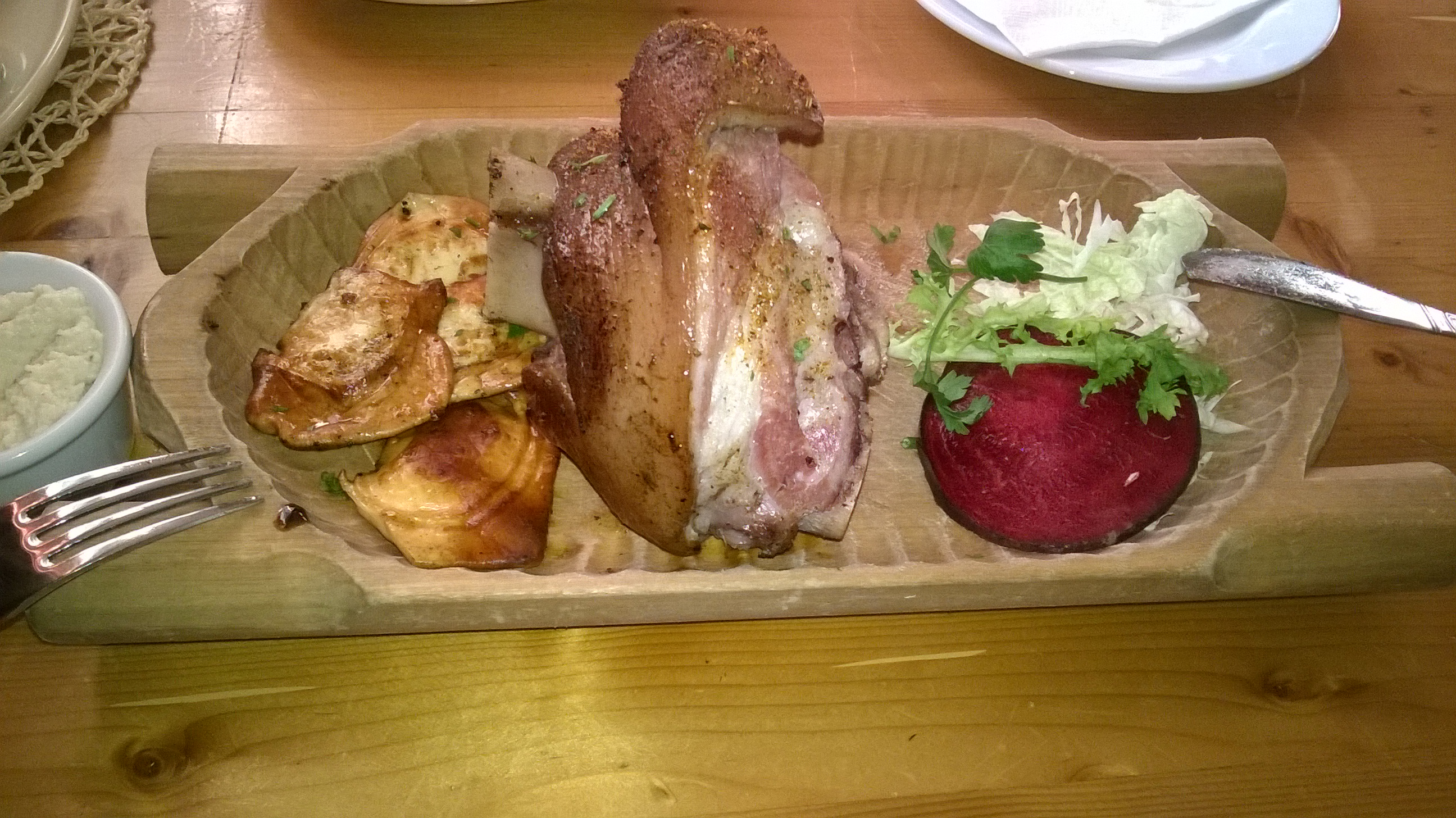
Ham hock (golonka) with grilled oscypek, horseradish and a slice of beetroot in Poland

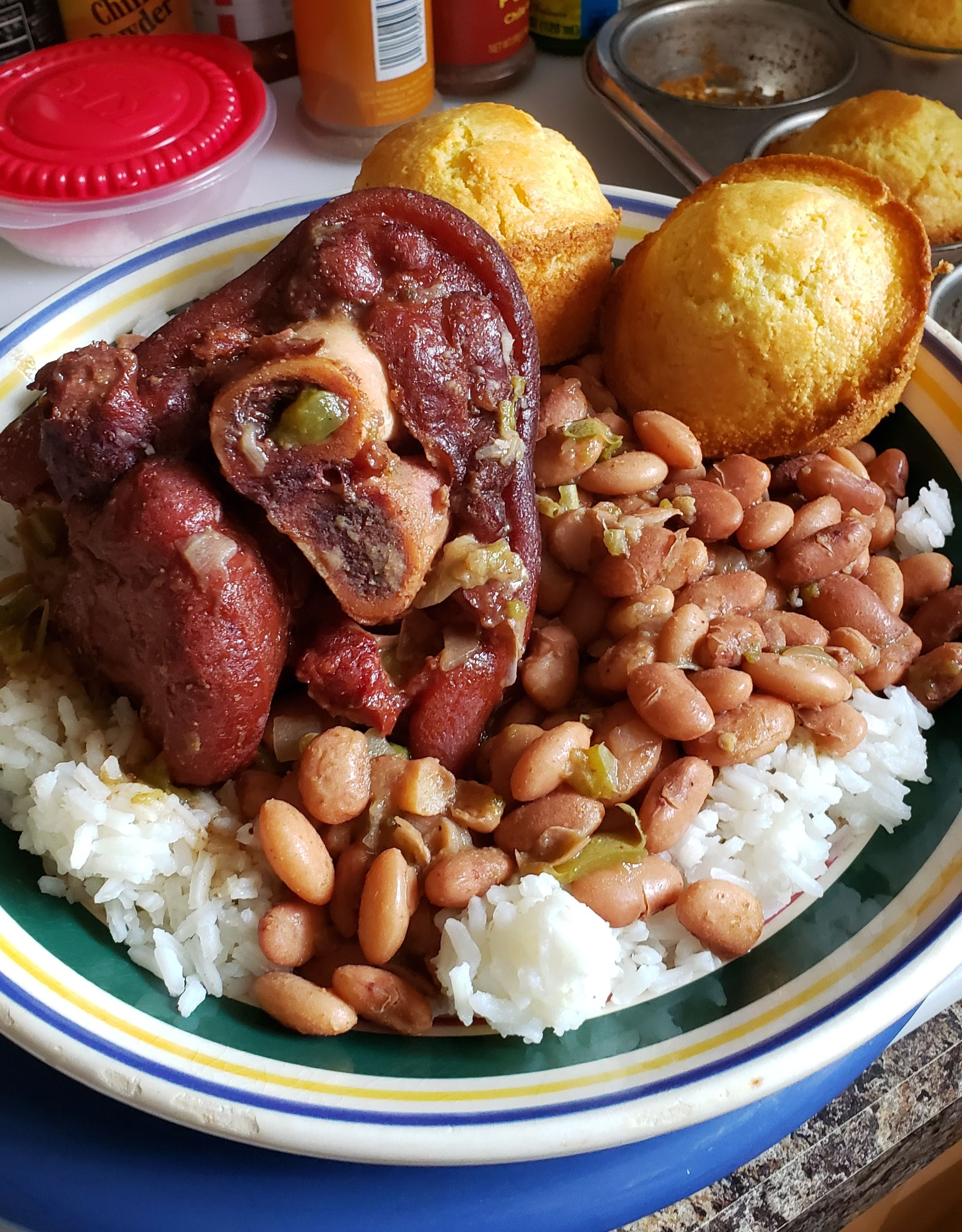
Ham hock cooked with pinto beans, served with white rice and cornbread.

== See also ==
- List of ham dishes
- List of smoked foods
