= Wanluan pork knuckle =

Taiwanese ham hock dish

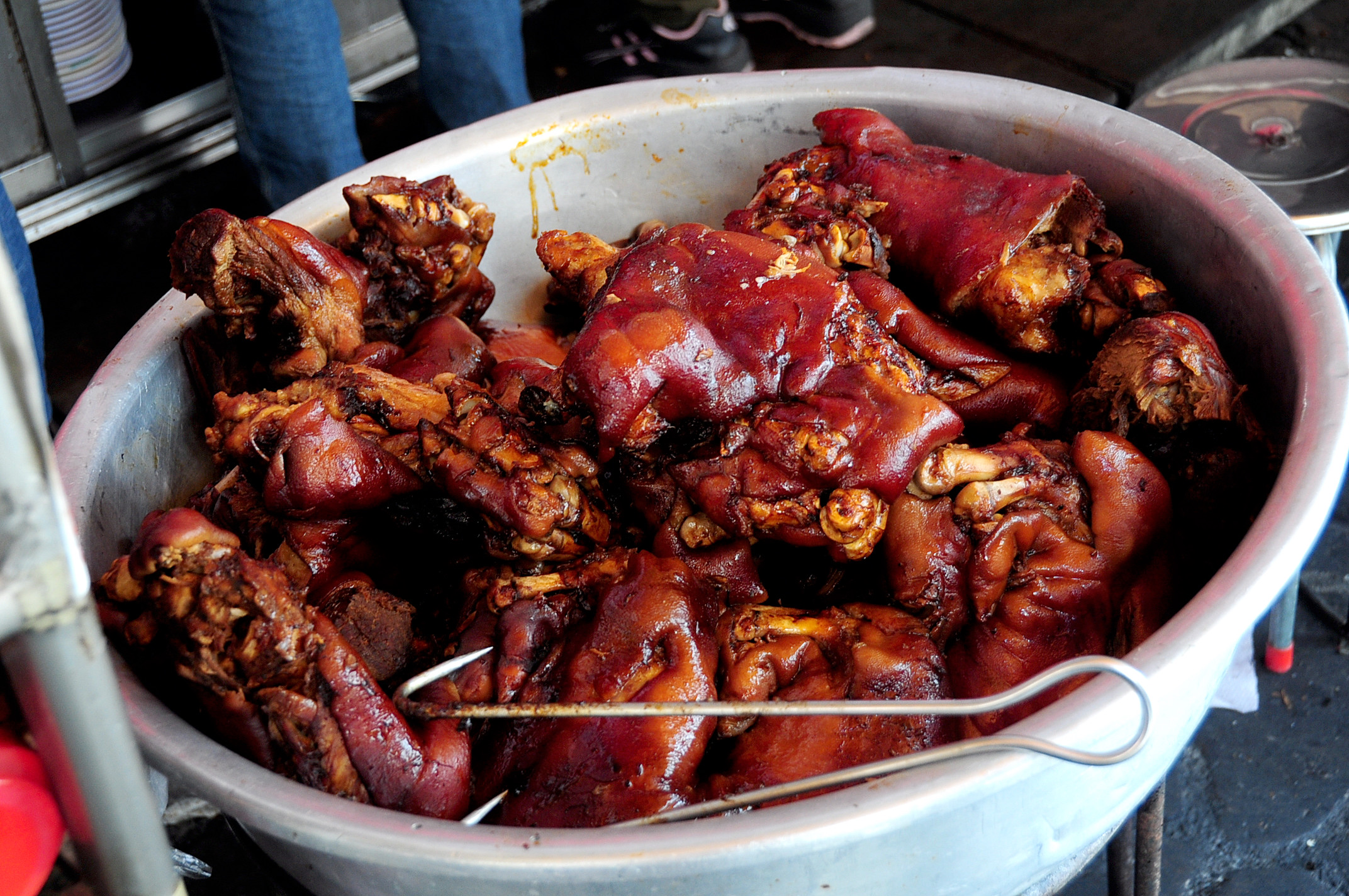
- Place of origin: Taiwan
- Region or state: Wanluan, Pingtung County
- Main ingredients: pork knuckle, spices

Wanluan pork knuckle (Chinese: 萬巒豬腳; Tongyong Pinyin: Wànluán jhūjiǎo; Tâi-lô: Bān-bân ti-kha) is a traditional Taiwanese ham hock dish originated from Wanluan, Pingtung County in southern Taiwan. The pork knuckle is simmered in a broth flavored with dozens of spices and traditional medicinal herbs, including star anise and cinnamon. The dish is a signature dish of the Liudui Hakka community in Pingtung. The dish gained attention and reputation across the country in 1980 when then-Taiwan President Chiang Ching-kuo visited Wanluan's market and stopped at the "Haihong Restaurant" (海鴻飯店). The dish symbolises good luck and longevity, thus it is often served on birthdays.

On 6 July 2011, the "Taiwan International Pork Knuckle Festival" (台灣國際豬腳節) was inaugurated to promote pork knuckle dishes in the country.

== See also ==
- Taiwanese cuisine
- List of pork dishes
