= Hamburger Speck =

German candy snack originating from Hamburg

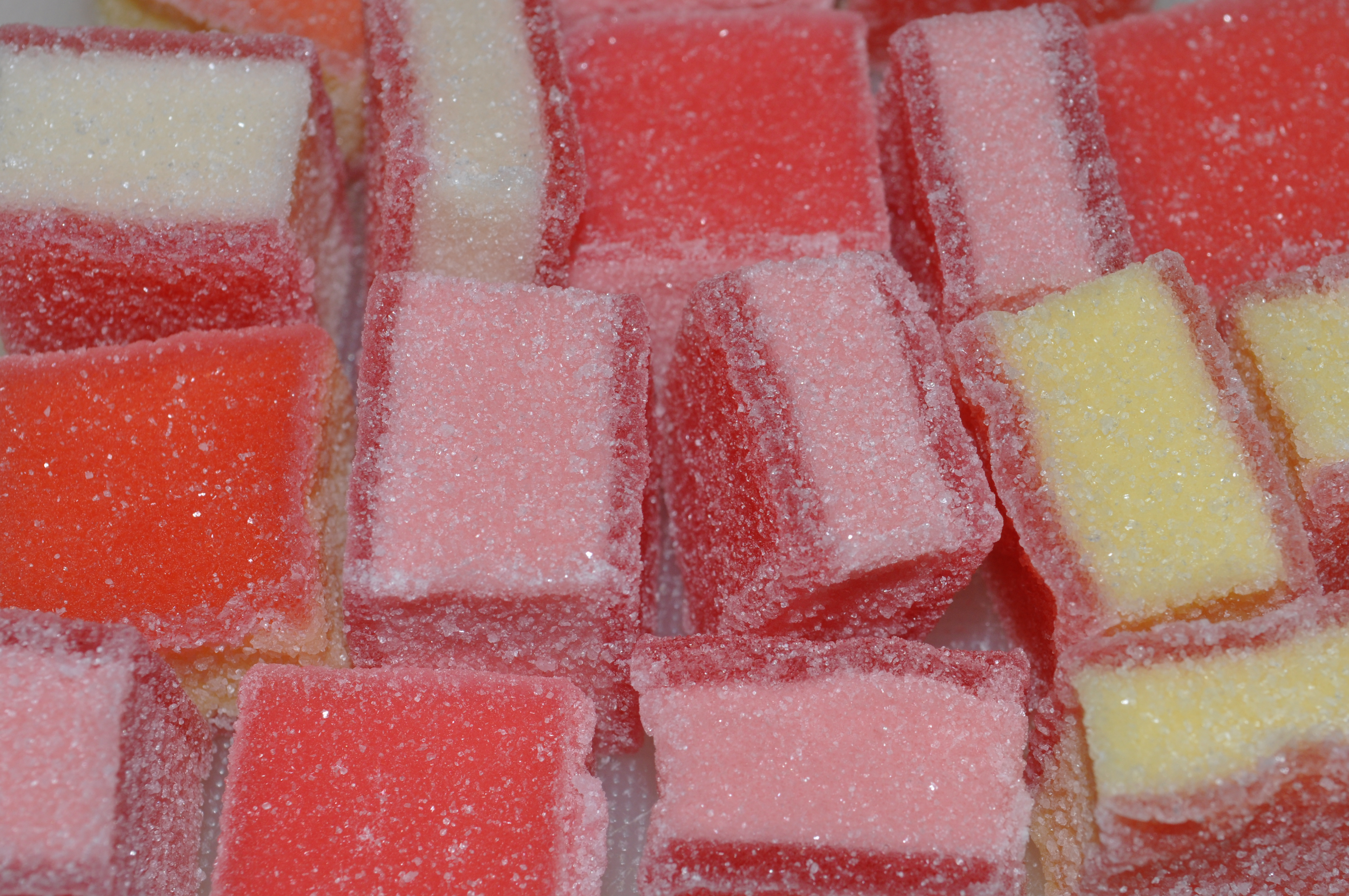
Hamburger Speck cubes

Hamburger Speck is a type of candy made out of foamed sugar with various coatings. The candy's colors are often the same as the colors of Hamburg's flag (red and white), with a white central square and two red outer squares. The name refers to the candy's similarity in appearance with bacon (or speck). The version "Helgoländer Speck" or "Helgoländer Schnitten" uses the colors of Heligoland and is red, white and green.
