= Steckrübeneintopf =

German dish

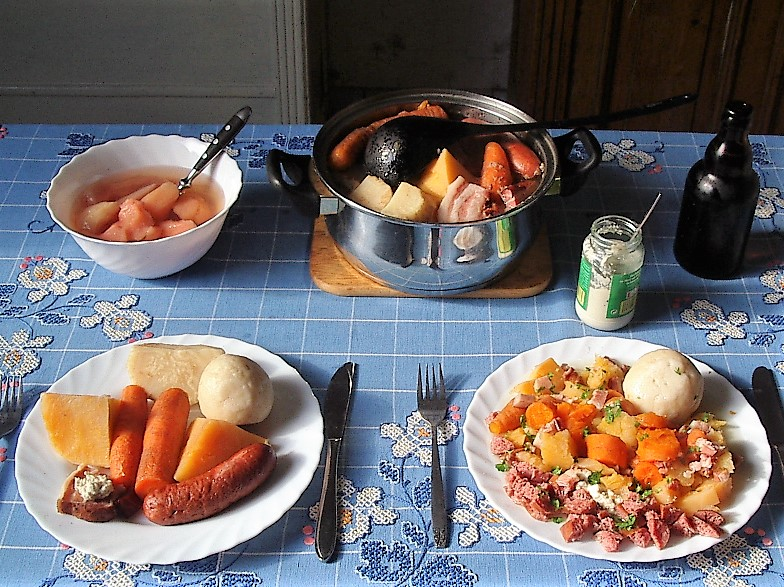
- Type: Soup
- Place of origin: Germany
- Main ingredients: Rutabaga, carrots, potatoes, smoked or pickled meats or sausages

Steckrübeneintopf is a German dish that, today, is especially common in North Germany. It generally consists of a stew made from swede, carrots and potatoes in varying proportions and diverse, usually smoked or pickled, types of meat or sausage. Occasionally special cooking pears used as well. The stew may be seasoned and refined with salt, pepper, mustard, horseradish, celery, leeks or parsley, etc., according to taste.

== Regional variations ==
On many farms this dish was prepared almost daily, alongside roast potatoes. Often it alternated with a second, daily-changing meal. For this reason, especially in the region of Stade, it is still called Tokokers (= Zugekochtes). If the meat is smoked, the dish is also called Rökert (= Geräuchertes or "smoked").

In Schleswig-Holstein, the stew is made with pre-cooked sausage (Kochwurst) and Kassler and is known as Rübenmalheur. For the variant known as Lübecker National, pork (blade, belly) is preferred and flour or cream are used as binding agents. This recipe can also contain onions. In Hamburg, the corresponding dish is called Hamburger National und can contain beef or chicken in addition to bacon and belly pork.

In Land Hadeln, the potatoes are generally replaced by white flour dumplings (Klüten), which is why it goes under the name of Speck und Klüten ("bacon and dumplings"). Up to the middle of the 20th century as particularly substantial version of this stew was a popular fare for dinner on Christmas Eve (Fullbuksobend = 'Vollbauchabend or "full belly evening").

== Sources ==
- Erna Kayser: Leckeres, Deftiges, Zartes, aus Hadler Küchen. Aus der Reihe Hadler Almanach, Niederelbe-Druck, Otterndorf, 1980.
