= Glucoberteroin =

Names
- IUPAC name [(2S,3R,4S,5S,6R)-3,4,5-trihydroxy-6-(hydroxymethyl)oxan-2-yl] (1E)-6-methylsulfanyl-N-sulfooxyhexanimidothioate

Identifiers
CAS Number	29611-01-6
3D model (JSmol)	Interactive image; anion: Interactive image
ChemSpider	7827650
PubChem CID	9548727; anion: 9548726
UNII	EJ23Z77QY3
- InChI: InChI=1S/C13H25NO9S3/c1-24-6-4-2-3-5-9(14-23-26(19,20)21)25-13-12(18)11(17)10(16)8(7-15)22-13/h8,10-13,15-18H,2-7H2,1H3,(H,19,20,21)/b14-9+/t8-,10-,11+,12-,13+/m1/s1 Key: MEFPHTVXBPLRLX-KHXSHCKASA-N; anion: InChI=1S/C13H25NO9S3/c1-24-6-4-2-3-5-9(14-23-26(19,20)21)25-13-12(18)11(17)10(16)8(7-15)22-13/h8,10-13,15-18H,2-7H2,1H3,(H,19,20,21)/p-1/b14-9+/t8-,10-,11+,12-,13+/m1/s1 Key: MEFPHTVXBPLRLX-KHXSHCKASA-M
- SMILES: CSCCCCC/C(=N\OS(=O)(=O)O)/S[C@H]1[C@@H]([C@H]([C@@H]([C@H](O1)CO)O)O)O; anion: CSCCCCC/C(=N\OS(=O)(=O)[O-])/S[C@H]1[C@@H]([C@H]([C@@H]([C@H](O1)CO)O)O)O

Properties
Chemical formula	C_{13}H_{25}NO_{9}S_{3}
- Except where otherwise noted, data are given for materials in their standard state (at 25 °C [77 °F], 100 kPa). Infobox references

Glucoberteroin is an organic compound belonging to the group of mustard oil glycosides.

== Occurrence ==
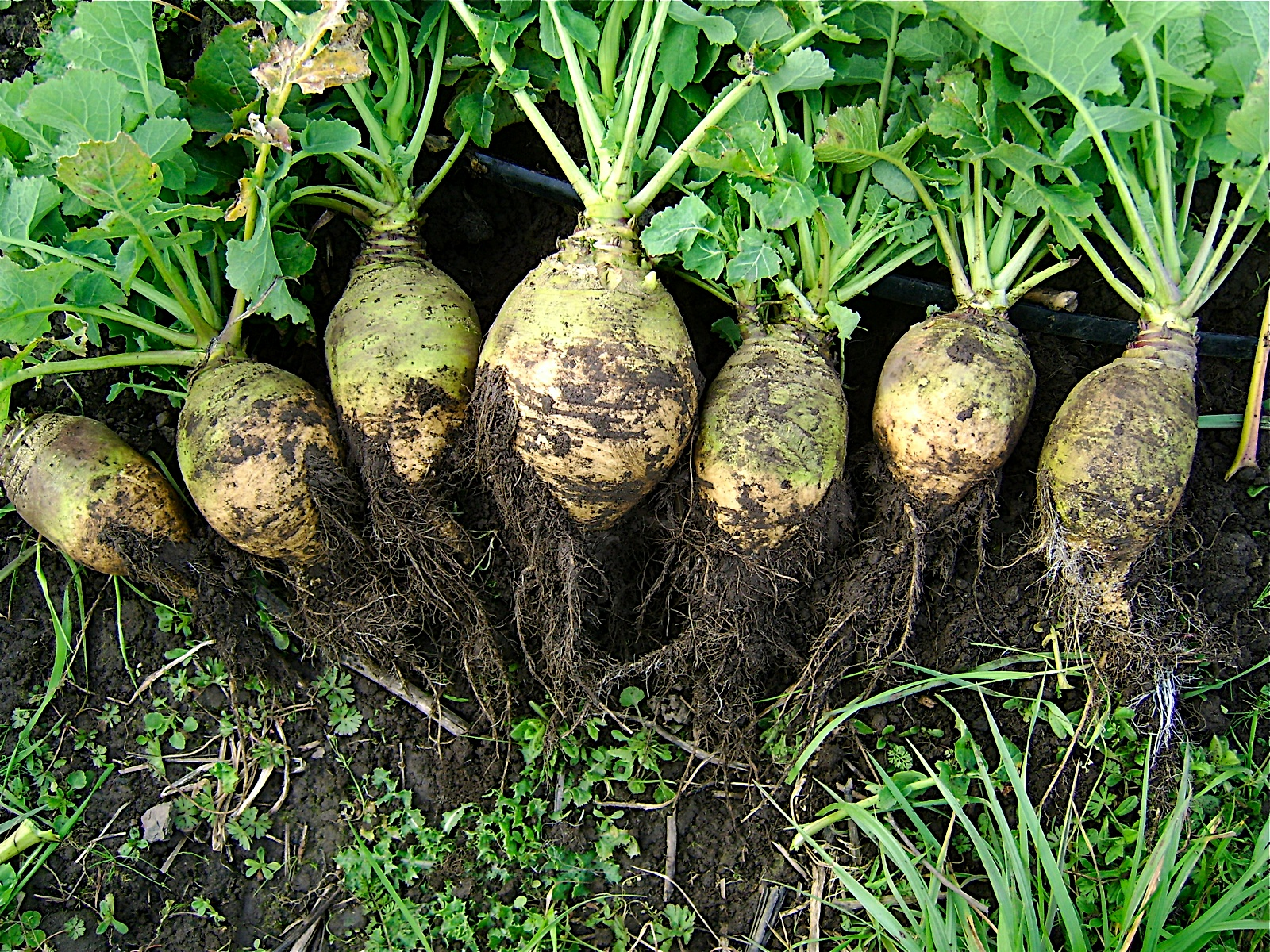
Beetroots contain glucoberteroin

Glucoberteroin occurs in Berteroa incana, in which it was first identified in the 1950s. It is also present in broccoli, turnip, and rutabaga.
