= List of English dishes =

This is a list of prepared dishes characteristic of English cuisine. English cuisine encompasses the cooking styles, traditions and recipes associated with England. It has distinctive attributes of its own, but also shares much with wider British cuisine, partly through the importation of ingredients and ideas from North America, China, and the Indian subcontinent during the time of the British Empire and as a result of post-war immigration.

Ingredients that might be used to prepare these dishes, such as English vegetables, cuts of meat, or cheeses do not themselves form part of this list.

== English dishes ==
Name	Image	First known	Savoury/ Sweet	Region of origin	Description
Balti	Balti gosht	1970s	Savoury	Birmingham	A type of curry served in a thin, pressed-steel wok called a balti bowl.
Bangers and mash			Savoury	National	Mashed potatoes and sausages, sometimes served with onion gravy or fried onions. Sausages date to 410 at the latest, while potatoes are from the Americas and were not introduced to Europe until the 16th century.
Beans on toast			Savoury	National	Tinned baked beans, heated, on toasted sliced bread.
Bedfordshire clanger		19th century	Savoury and sweet	Bedfordshire	Suet crust dumpling with a savoury filling one end, sweet filling the other. The savoury filling is usually meat with diced potatoes and vegetables. The sweet filling can be jam, cooked apple or other fruit.
Beef Wellington		1939	Savoury	National	Beef cooked in a pastry crust
Black peas			Savoury	Lancashire	Purple podded peas soaked overnight and simmered until mushy
Black (blood) pudding		800BC (in The Odyssey)	Savoury	National (Note: But also traditional across Europe in both Latin and Germanic countries from Portugal in west to Lithuania in east, and from Italy in south to Sweden in north.)	Blood sausage
Bubble and squeak			Savoury	National	Fried mashed potato with cabbage; often made from leftovers
Cauliflower cheese			Savoury	National	Cauliflower in a thick cheese sauce
China chilo		Victorian Era	Savoury		Stewed with onions, peas and lettuce, mutton is served in a dish surrounded by a border of rice.
Cobbler		19th century, perhaps earlier	Savoury or Sweet	National	Fruit or savoury (e.g. beef) filling, covered with a scone mixture and baked
Cottage pie		1791	Savoury	National	Beef or occasionally other meat, minced or in pieces, with mashed potato crust
Cumberland sausage			Savoury	Cumberland	Long sausage
Deviled Egg		16th century	Savoury	National	
Devilled kidneys			Savoury	National	Lamb’s kidneys cooked in a spiced sauce.
Faggots		1851	Savoury	Midlands	Meatballs made from minced off-cuts and offal, especially pork (traditionally pig's heart, liver, and fatty belly meat or bacon) together with herbs for flavouring and sometimes added bread crumbs.
Fish and chips		1870 approx.	Savoury	National	White fish fillets in batter (or egg-and-breadcrumbs), deep fried with thick cut chips of potato.
Full English breakfast		1861 (Note: Date is for Mrs Beeton's book, but not exactly the breakfast eaten today.)	Savoury	National	A selection of fried foods such as sausages, bacon, eggs, mushrooms, bread, tomatoes; options include kippers, baked beans
Game pie			Savoury	National	Hot water crust pastry filled with savoury combinations of rabbit, venison, pigeon, pheasant, and other commercially available game.
Groaty pudding		1805	Savoury	Black Country	Soaked groats, beef, leeks, onion and beef stock which are baked together at a moderate temperature for up to 16 hours.
Hog's pudding			Savoury	Devon, Cornwall	
Hot cross bun		1361	Sweet	Hertfordshire	
Jellied eels			Savoury	East End of London	
Kippers			Savoury	National	Smoked split herrings
Lancashire hotpot			Savoury	Lancashire	Meat stew with carrots, potatoes, onions
Lincolnshire sausage			Savoury	Lincolnshire	
Liver and onion/Liver and bacon			Savoury	National	
Macaroni cheese		1769	Savoury	Northern England	A pasta dish of macaroni covered in cheese sauce.
Panackelty			Savoury	Sunderland	Slow-baked meat and root vegetables
Parmo			Savoury	Middlesbrough	Chicken or other cutlet in breadcrumbs
Pasty		13th century	Savoury	Cornwall, National	Pastry shell filled with meat and potatoes
Pease pudding			Savoury	North East	Split peas or lentils cooked until soft and thick
Pie and mash			Savoury	East-End,	National
Ploughman's lunch		1950s	Savoury	National	Typical British lunch consisting of bread (normally buttered), cheese, onion, and sometimes pickle.
Pork pie		1780s	Savoury	Melton Mowbray, National	Cylindrical pie filled with pork and meat jelly
Potted shrimps		19th century or earlier	Savoury	Lancashire (Morecambe Bay)	Shrimps preserved under melted butter
Rag pudding			Savoury	Lancashire (Oldham)	Minced meat with onions in a suet pastry, which is then boiled or steamed.
Scouse		1706	Savoury	Liverpool and other seaports, from Northern Europe	Lamb or beef stew with potatoes, carrots and onions, cf Norwegian lobscouse
Scotch Egg			Savoury	National	A boiled egg which is wrapped in sausage, then breadcrumbs and deep fried
Shepherd's pie			Savoury	National	Baked pie made with minced lamb or beef and a topping of mashed potatoes
Stargazy pie		20th century	Savoury	Cornwall	Fish pie with sardines poking out of the piecrust, pointing upwards, as if looking at the stars
Steak pie		1303	Savoury	National	Beef and gravy in a pastry shell. Can also include ingredients such as ale, kidney, oysters, potato and root vegetables
Steak and kidney pie			Savoury	National	Beef, kidneys and gravy in a pastry shell.
Steak and kidney pudding		1861	Savoury	National	Suet pudding filled with pieces of beef and kidney in thick gravy
Steak and oyster pie, See Steak pies					
Stottie cake			Savoury	North East England	Heavy flat bread
Suet pudding		1714	Savoury or sweet	National	Steamed pudding made with flour and suet, with meat or fruit mixed in
Sunday roast		18th century	Savoury	National	Roast beef 1700s, Yorkshire pudding (1747), roast potatoes, vegetables. Roast beef with Yorkshire pudding is a national dish of the United Kingdom.
Roast lamb with mint sauce			Savoury	National	
Roast pork with apple sauce			Savoury	National	
Toad in the hole		1747; 1788 1891	Savoury	National	Sausages cooked in a tray of batter
Welsh rarebit			Savoury	National	Melted cheese on toast
Yorkshire pudding		1747	Savoury	Yorkshire, National	Souffle batter baked in very hot oven.
Apple pie		1390	Sweet	National (Note: Apple pies are also found in North America, Netherlands, Germany, Scandinavia.)	A pie crust, whether all round or only on top, with a filling of sweetened apple
Arctic roll			Sweet	National	
Bakewell tart		20th century	Sweet	Derbyshire	Pastry shell filled with almond-flavoured sponge cake on a thin layer of jam. Developed from 1826 Bakewell pudding
Banoffee pie			Sweet	Hungry Monk Restaurant, East Sussex	Pastry shell filled with bananas, cream and toffee
Battenberg cake			Sweet	National	
Bread and butter pudding			Sweet	National	
Butterscotch tart			Sweet	National	
Christmas pudding			Sweet	National	
Eccles cake		1793	Sweet	Greater Manchester	Flaky pastry with butter and currants
Eton mess		19th century	Sweet	Berkshire (Eton College)	
Eve's pudding			Sweet	National	
Fool			Sweet	National	
Gypsy tart			Sweet	Kent	
Cornish Hevva Cake			Sweet	Cornwall	
Jam roly-poly			Sweet	National	
Jam tart			Sweet	National	
Knickerbocker glory		1920s	Sweet	National; possibly from New York	Ice cream sundae in a tall glass, often with nuts, fruits, meringue, and chocolate sauce; served with whipped cream and a glacé cherry
Lardy cake			Sweet	Southern England	
Madeira cake			Sweet	National	
Mince pie		1624	Sweet	National	Usually small pastry shells filled with sweet mincemeat; since Early Modern times actual meat omitted
Parkin			Sweet	Yorkshire	
Pound cake			Sweet	National	
Queen of Puddings			Sweet	National	
Saffron cake			Sweet	Cornwall	
Scone			Sweet	National	Small bread-like cakes often with raisins
Spotted dick		19th century	Sweet	National	Pudding with suet pastry and dried vine fruits, usually served with custard
Sticky toffee pudding			Sweet	National	
Summer pudding			Sweet	National	
Sussex pond pudding			Sweet		
Syllabub			Sweet	National	Cold dessert made with cream, alcohol and sugar, often with citrus flavouring
Trifle			Sweet	National	Cold dessert with varied ingredients, often sponge fingers and fortified wine, jelly, custard, and whipped cream, usually in layers
Treacle tart			Sweet	National	Pastry shell filled with thick sweet treacle mixture
Victoria sponge cake			Sweet	National	

== See also ==
- List of English cheeses

== Sources ==
- Ayrton, Elisabeth (1974) The Cookery of England: being a collection of recipes for traditional dishes of all kinds from the fifteenth century to the present day, with notes on their social and culinary background. London: Andre Deutsch.
- Ayrton, Elisabeth (1980) English Provincial Cooking. London: Mitchell Beazley.
- Grigson, Jane (1974) English Food. London: Macmillan. Enlarged edition 1979 (ISBN 0-333-26866-0); later editions Ebury Press with foreword by Sophie Grigson.
- Dickson Wright, Clarissa (2011) A History of English Food. London: Random House. ISBN 978-1-905-21185-2.
- Hartley, Dorothy (1954) Food in England. London: Macdonald (reissued: London: Little, Brown, 1996, ISBN 0-316-85205-8)
- Lehmann, Gilly (2003) The British Housewife. Totnes: Prospect Books.
- Panayi, Panikos (2010 [2008]) Spicing Up Britain. London: Reaktion Books. ISBN 978-1-86189-658-2.
