= Bubble and squeak =

English breakfast dish

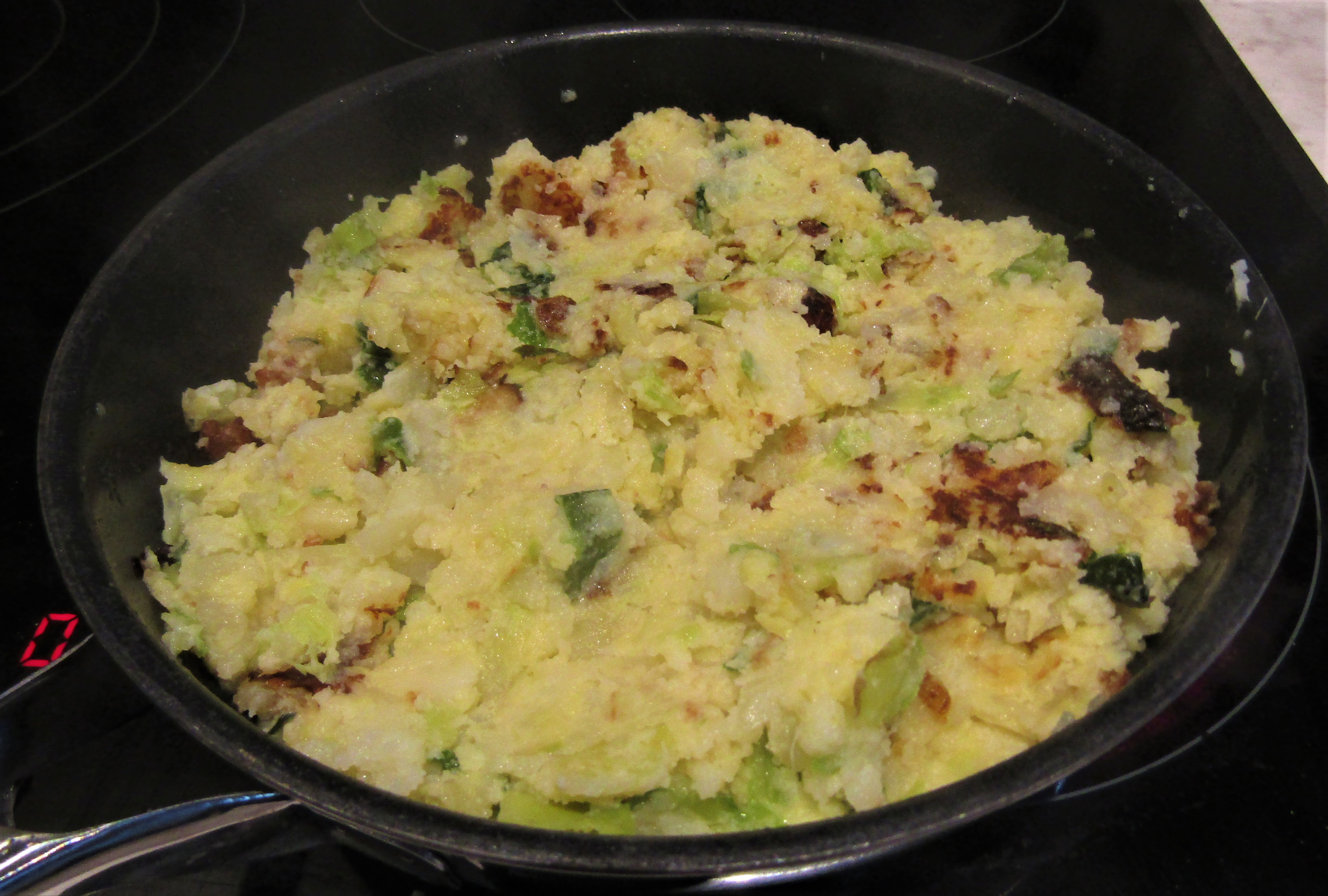
- Pan-fried bubble and squeak
- Place of origin: England, United Kingdom
- Main ingredients: Potato, cabbage

Bubble and squeak is an English dish made from cooked potatoes and cabbage, mixed together and fried. The food writer Howard Hillman classes it as one of the "great peasant dishes of the world". The dish has been known since at least the 18th century, and in its early versions it contained cooked beef; by the mid-20th century the two vegetables had become the principal ingredients.

== History ==
The name of the dish, according to the Oxford English Dictionary (OED), alludes to the sounds made by the ingredients when being fried. The first recorded use of the name listed in the OED dates from 1762; The St James's Chronicle, recording the dishes served at a banquet, included "Bubble and Squeak, garnish'd with Eddowes Cow Bumbo, and Tongue". A correspondent in The Public Advertiser two years later reported making "a very hearty Meal on fryed [sic] Beef and Cabbage; though I could not have touched it had my Wife recommended it to me under the fashionable Appellation of Bubble and Squeak". In 1791 another London paper recorded the quarterly meeting of the Bubble and Squeak Society at Smithfield.

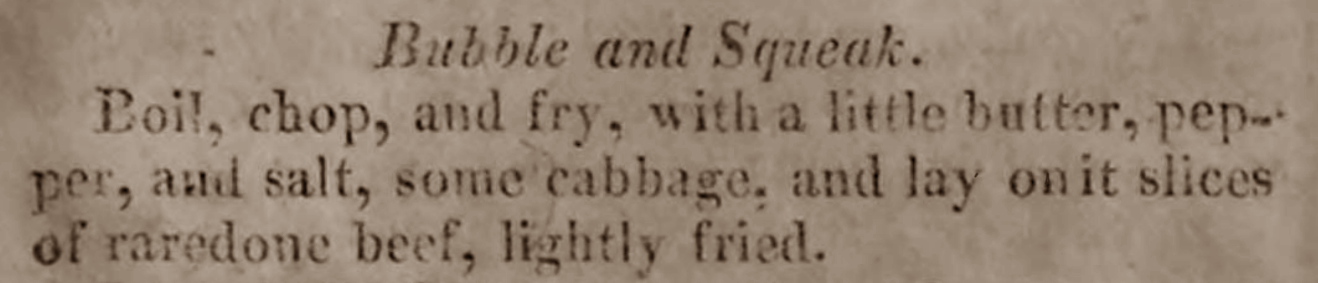
Maria Rundell's recipe, 1806

The dish as it is made in modern times differs considerably from its first recorded versions, in which cooked beef was the main ingredient and potatoes did not feature. The earliest-known recipe is in Maria Rundell's A New System of Domestic Cookery, published in 1806. It consists wholly of cabbage and rare roast beef, seasoned and fried. This method is followed by William Kitchiner in his book Apicius Redivivus, or The Cook's Oracle (1817); in later editions he adds a couplet at the top of his recipe:

When 'midst the frying Pan in accents savage,
The Beef, so surly, quarrels with the Cabbage.

Mrs Beeton's recipe in her Book of Household Management (1861) similarly combines cooked beef with cabbage (and, in her recipe, onions) but no potato. An 1848 recipe from the US is similar, but adds chopped carrots. In all of these, the meat and vegetables are served next to each other, and not mixed together.

In 1872 a Lancashire newspaper offered a recipe for "delicious bubble and squeak", consisting of thinly sliced beef fried with cabbage and carrot, but not potatoes, although by then they had been a major crop in Lancashire for decades. In the 1880s potatoes began to appear in recipes. In 1882 the "Household" column of The Manchester Times suggested:

Bubble and Squeak. – Mash four potatoes, chop a plateful of cold greens, season with a small saltspoonful of salt and the same of pepper; mix well together, and fry in dissolved dripping or butter (three ounces), stirring all the time. Cut about three-quarters of a pound of cold, boiled beef into neat, thin slices. Fry slightly over a slow fire six minutes. Put the vegetables round the dish and the meat in the centre. Serve very hot.

Potatoes featured in a recipe printed in a Yorkshire paper in 1892 but, as in earlier versions, the main ingredients were beef and cabbage.

== Modern versions ==
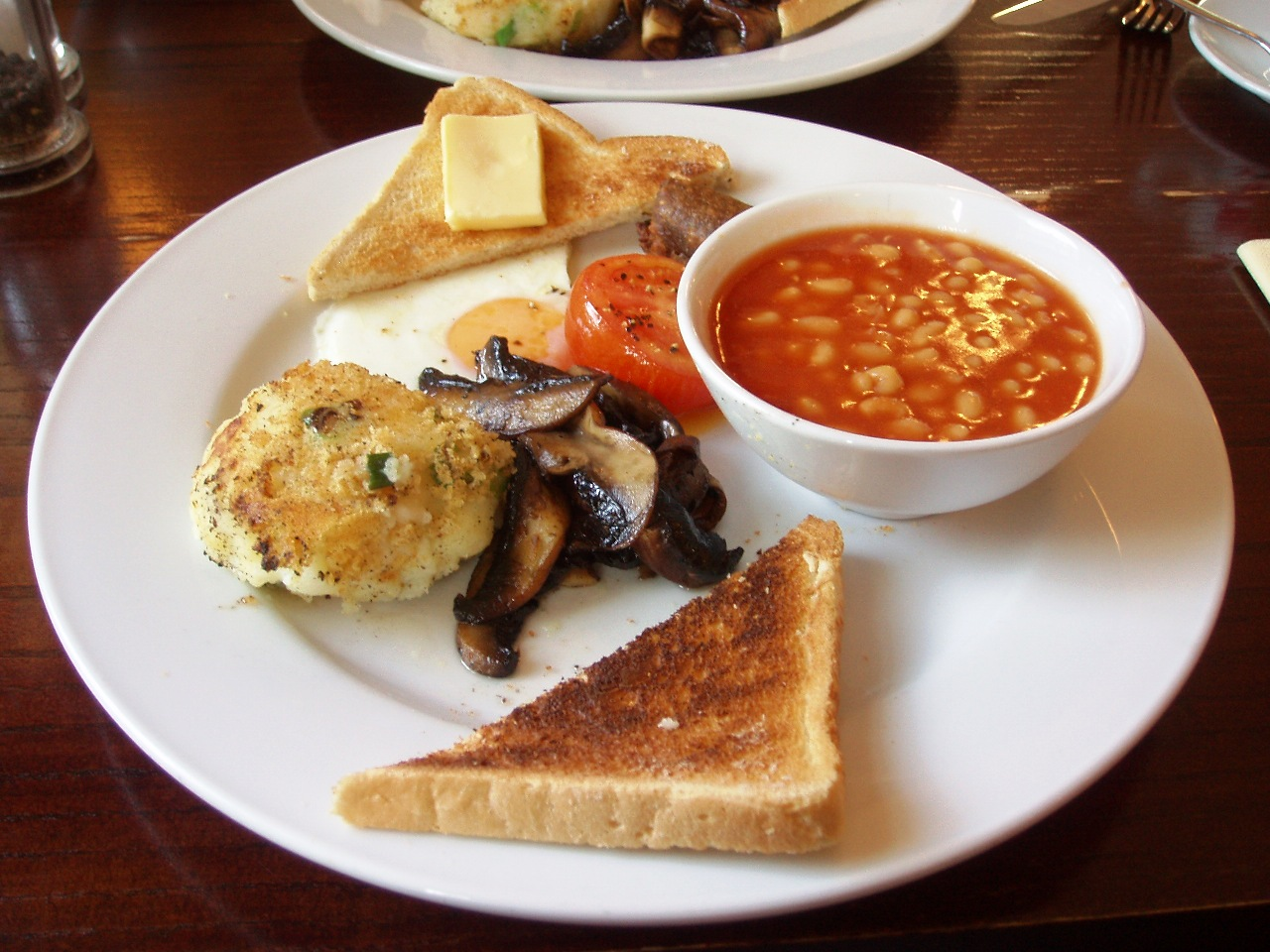
Bubble and squeak, left

Possibly because of the scarcity of beef during food rationing in and after the Second World War, by the latter half of the 20th century the basic ingredients were widely considered to be cooked and mashed (or coarsely crushed) potato and chopped cooked cabbage. Those are the only two ingredients in Delia Smith's 1987 recipe. Clarissa Dickson Wright's 1996 version consists of crushed cooked potatoes, finely chopped raw onion, and cooked cabbage (or Brussels sprouts), seasoned with salt and pepper, mixed together and shallow-fried until browned on the exterior. Like Smith, Dickson Wright specifies dripping (or lard) for frying, finding vegetable oil unsuitable for frying bubble and squeak, because the mixture will not brown adequately. Several other cooks find oil or butter satisfactory.

Fiona Beckett (2008), like Smith and Dickson Wright, stipulates no ingredients other than potato and cabbage, but there are many published variants of the basic recipe. Gary Rhodes favours sliced Brussels sprouts, rather than cabbage, with gently cooked sliced onions and mashed potato, fried in butter. He comments that although the basic ingredients of bubble and squeak and colcannon are similar, the two are very different dishes, the former being traditionally made from leftovers and fried to give a brown crust, and the latter "a completely separate dish of potato, spring onion and cabbage, served almost as creamed potatoes".

Jeff Smith (1987) adds grated courgettes and chopped ham and bacon. Mark Hix (2005) adds cooked and chopped leeks and swede to the mix. Jamie Oliver (2007) adds chestnuts and "whatever veg you like – carrots, Brussels, swedes, turnips, onions, leeks or Savoy cabbage". Nigel Slater, in a 2013 recipe using Christmas leftovers, adds chopped goose, ham and pumpkin to the mixture.

The mixture is then shallow-fried, either shaped into round cakes or as a single panful and then sliced. The first method is suggested by Delia Smith, Hix and Slater; Rhodes finds both methods satisfactory; Dickson Wright, Oliver and Jeff Smith favour the whole-pan method.

== Outside Britain ==
Bubble and squeak is familiar in Australia; a 1969 recipe adds peas and pumpkin to the basic mix. The dish is not common in the US but is not unknown; an American recipe from 1913 resembles Rundell's version, with the addition of a border of mashed potato. In 1983 the American food writer Howard Hillman included bubble and squeak in his survey Great Peasant Dishes of the World. More recently Forbes magazine ran an article about the dish in 2004. A Canadian newspaper in 1959 reported a minor controversy about the origins of the dish, with readers variously claiming it as Australian, English, Irish and Scottish. In 1995, another Canadian paper called the dish "universally beloved".

== Similar dishes ==
- Panackelty, from north-east England
- Rumbledethumps, stovies and clapshot from Scotland
- Colcannon and champ, from Ireland
- Stoemp from Belgium
- Calentao, from Colombia
- Bauernfrühstück and Stemmelkort, from Germany
- Aloo tikki, from India
- Stamppot, from the Netherlands
- Trinxat, from the La Cerdanya region of Catalonia, northeast Spain and Andorra
- Matevž, from Slovenia
- Pytt i panna, Pytt i panne, Pyttipannu and Biksemad from Sweden, Norway, Finland and Denmark
- Hash, from the United States

== Other uses of term ==
The OED gives a secondary definition of "bubble and squeak": "figurative and in figurative contexts. Something resembling or suggestive of bubble and squeak, especially in consisting of a variety of elements". In 1825 a reviewer in The Morning Post dismissed a new opera at Covent Garden as "a sort of bubble and squeak mixture of English and Italian". The OED gives examples from the 18th to the 21st centuries, including, from Coleridge, "... the restless Bubble and Squeak of his Vanity and Discontent", and from D. H. Lawrence, "I can make the most lovely bubble and squeak of a life for myself". In cockney rhyming slang the phrase was formerly used for "beak" (magistrate) and more recently "Bubble" has been used for "Greek".

The term has been borrowed by authors of children's books as names for a pair of puppies and (by two different authors) pairs of mice.

In the late 1940s, George Moreno Jr., an American animator living and working in England, borrowed the term, re-spelling it "Bubble and Squeek," for a series of cartoon shorts released by Associated British-Pathe. The star characters of Moreno's cartoons were a humanized taxi (Squeek) and its driver (Bubble).

== References and sources ==
=== Sources ===
- Beckett, Fiona (2008). The Frugal Cook. Bath: Absolute Press. ISBN 978-1-904573-85-2.
- Beeton, Isabella (1861). The Book of Household Management. London: S. O. Beeton.
- Hillman, Howard (1983). Great Peasant Dishes of the World. Boston: Houghton Mifflin. ISBN 978-0-395-32210-9.
- Hix, Mark (2005). British Food. London: Quadrille. ISBN 978-1-84400-213-9.
- Kalman, Bobbie (1992). Food for the Settler. Toronto and New York: Crabtree. ISBN 978-0-86505-013-6.
- Kitchiner, William (1817). Apicius Redivivus or, The Cook's Oracle. London: S. Bagster. OCLC 1039992330.
- Kitchiner, William (1827). The Cook's Oracle. London: Houlston and Stoneman. OCLC 1040257989.
- McCorquodale, Duncan (2009). A Visual History of Cookery. London: Black Dog. ISBN 978-1-906155-50-6.
- Oliver, Jamie (2007). Jamie at Home: Cook Your Way to the Good Life. London: Michael Joseph. ISBN 978-0-7181-5243-7.
- Paterson, Jennifer; Clarissa Dickson Wright (1996). Two Fat Ladies. London: Ebury Press. ISBN 978-0-09-186524-5.
- Rhodes, Gary (1995). Rhodes & More Rhodes Around Britain. London: Ted Smart. OCLC 1194908499.
- Rundell, Maria (1806). A New System of Domestic Cookery. Exeter: Norris & Sawyer. OCLC 1040258603.
- Smith, Delia (1987). Frugal Food. London: Coronet Books. ISBN 978-0-340-71294-8.
- Smith, Jeff (1987). The Frugal Gourmet. New York: Ballantine Books. ISBN 978-0-345-33523-4.
- Wilson, C. Anne (1991). Food & Drink in Britain: From the Stone Age to the 19th Century. London: Constable. ISBN 978-0-09-470760-3.
