= Costes =

Costes may refer to:

== Businesses ==
- Costes (restaurant), in Budapest, Hungary
- Hôtel Costes, a hotel in Paris, France, noted for its lounge music compilation CDs

== People with the surname ==
- Arnaud Costes (born 1973), French rugby union footballer
- Dieudonné Costes (1892–1973), French aviator
- Frédéric Costes (born 1957), French rugby union footballer
- Jean-Louis Costes (born 1954), French musician, performance artist, and actor
