= Babel (restaurant) =

Restaurant in Budapest

Coordinates: 47.4927°N 19.0522°E

Babel is a restaurant in Budapest. In 2017 the restaurant was chosen by Decanter magazine's reviewer Fiona Beckett as restaurant of the year. As of 2023 it was one of Hungary's seven Michelin-1-star-rated restaurants.

== Description ==
The restaurant offers modern cuisine. Most of the restaurant's ingredients come from Hungary and Transylvania. Its walls show evidence of the 1838 Great Flood of Pest.

== History ==
The restaurant was opened 2008 in Budapest by Hubert Hlatky-Schlichter, an entrepreneur with no restaurant experience. He hired a chef István Veres from Transylvania; Veres left in August 2020 after the restaurant had closed due to the COVID pandemic.

== Reception ==
In 2017 the restaurant was chosen by Decanter magazine's reviewer Fiona Beckett as restaurant of the year. As of 2023 it was one of Hungary's seven Michelin-1-star-rated restaurants.

== See also ==
- List of Michelin-starred restaurants in Hungary
- List of restaurants in Hungary
