= Hoppel poppel =

Leftover potato and egg casserole

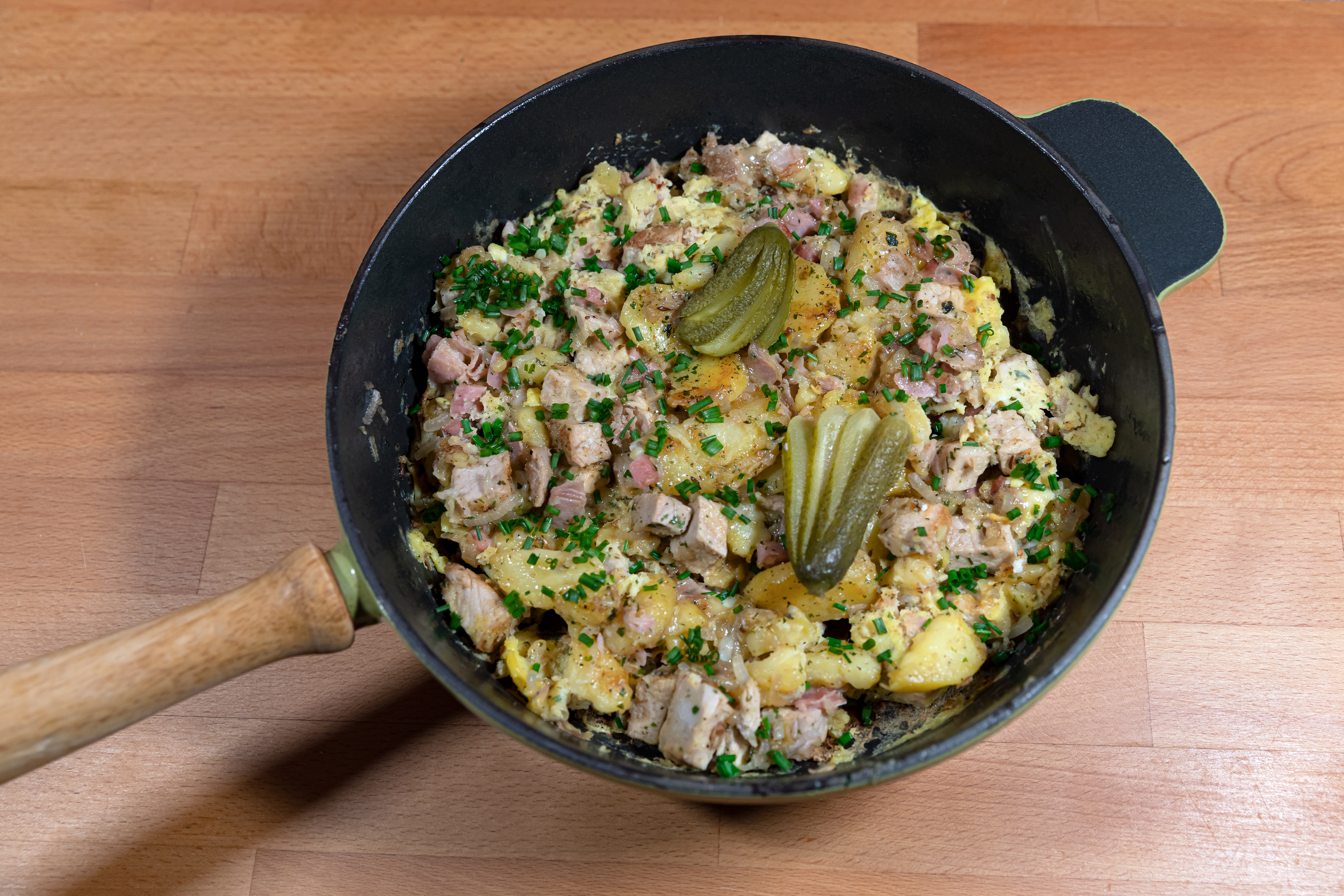
Hoppel poppel.

Hoppel poppel is an egg casserole made with leftovers, a dish associated with frugal housewives.

Found in German and Austrian cuisine, the casserole dish is also associated with the Midwestern United States. The basic recipe for the casserole is home fries (fried potatoes), scrambled eggs, and onion. Sometimes it is topped with melted cheese. Other ingredients like green pepper or mushrooms can be added to the basic combination, and a variety of meats can be used including bacon, ham and salami.

== Description ==
The basic form of the dish was just potatoes, onions, meat and scrambled eggs, but more elaborate variations could be devised with green peppers, melted cheese and mushrooms. The meat could be ham, bacon, sausage, or even all-beef salami. Hoppel poppel was served at Jewish delicatessens (despite not strictly adhering to kosher dietary regulations) and these establishments made the dish with all-beef salami.

== Preparation ==
=== With bacon ===
To make Hoppel Poppel the first step was to cook the meat in a skillet, then set the cooked meat aside and add the onions to cook in the drippings. The onions were removed from the pan once they took on a golden color, and butter was added to the remaining drippings, then the potatoes were seasoned with salt and pepper and when they were browned the meat and onions were returned to the pan and the eggs added until the eggs set.

=== With beef salami ===
Another way of making hoppel poppel without pork begins by parboiling the potatoes, then slicing them and frying in vegetable oil. Butter is added with onions, mushrooms, green peppers and beef salami. The eggs and whisked with milk and parsley and gently scrambled in the skillet. When the eggs have started to set the cheese topping can be added, and the dish cooked covered for a few more minutes until the cheese has melted and the eggs are fully cooked.

=== With boiled beef ===
Hoppel poppel could also be made with boiled beef to use up leftovers. This version of the dish begins by cooking the boiled beef and onion in butter, with bacon. When the bacon is cooked whisked eggs are added and cooked like an omelette.

=== With ham ===
For a hoppel poppel with ham, cubed potatoes and onions were pan-fried in butter until the potatoes were browned, then ham was added to the skillet. Eggs were whisked with cognac, salt and pepper, and Worcestershire sauce and poured into the skillet, cooked gently as an omelette, with fresh parsley. When the omelette is set it was topped with grated cheese and finished in the broiler.

== See also ==
- Bauernfrühstück
- Stemmelkort
