= Rag pudding =

English savoury dish

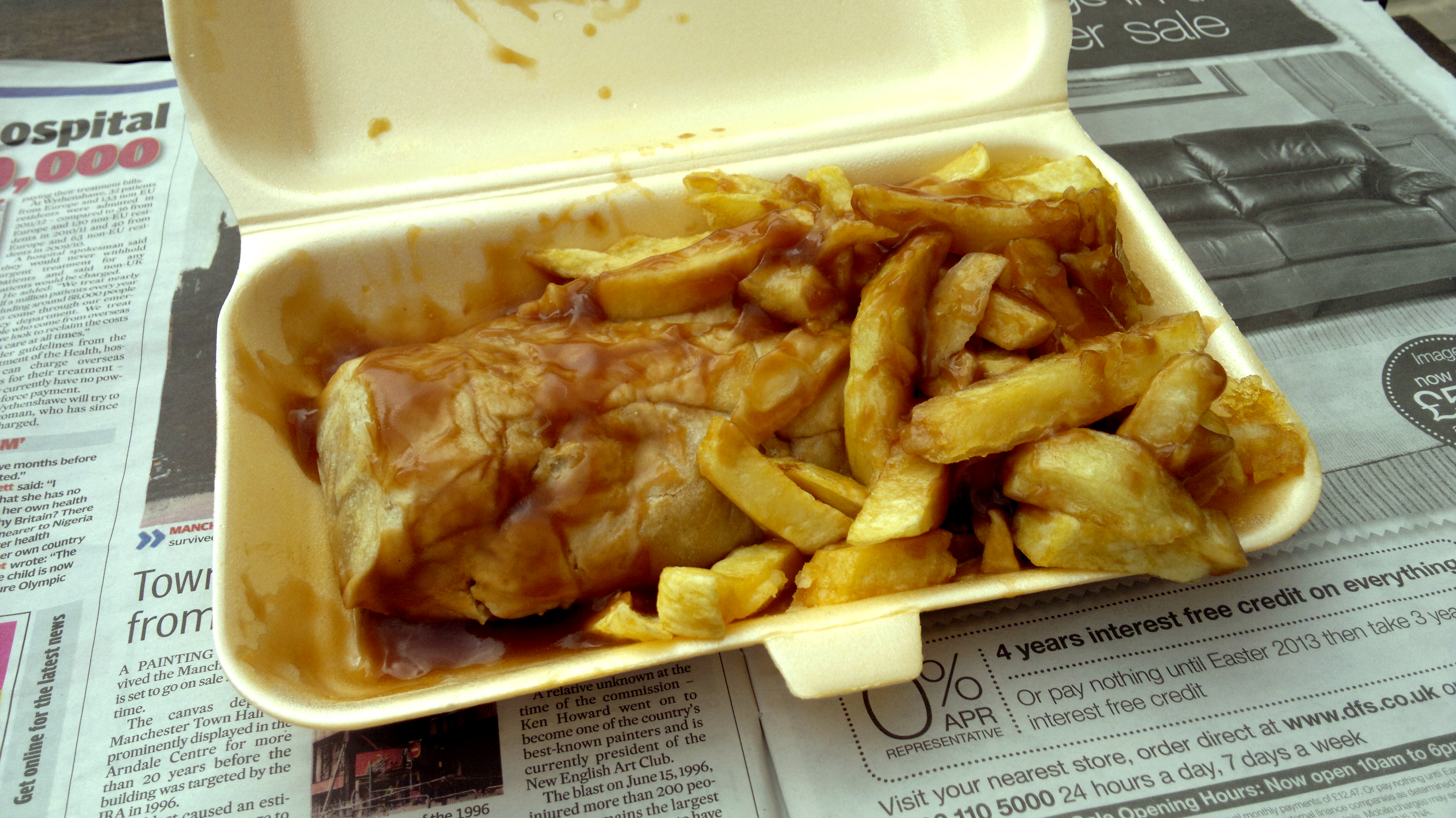
- Rag pudding, with chips and gravy
- Type: Savoury pudding
- Course: Main course
- Place of origin: England
- Region or state: Greater Manchester
- Serving temperature: Hot
- Main ingredients: Minced meat, onions, suet pastry

Rag pudding is a savoury dish consisting of minced meat and onions wrapped in a suet pastry, which is then cooked in a cheesecloth. Invented in Oldham, the dish is also popular in Bury and Rochdale, and is eaten across the Greater Manchester area. Rag pudding pre-dates ceramic basins and plastic boiling bags in cookery, and so the cotton or muslin rag cloths common in Oldham were used in the dish's preparation during the 19th century. Rag pudding is similar in composition and preparation to steak and kidney pudding, and may be purchased from traditional local butcher's shops in Lancashire.
