= Butterscotch tart =

British tart variety

Butterscotch tart is a British tart variety originating either in 1600s Scotland or 19th century Yorkshire. It has a light texture with a pudding-like consistency.

Butterscotch tart is made from brown sugar, butter, and flour. It was a common dessert in British school canteens in the 20th century.

== Preparation ==
Butterscotch tart generally consists of a shortcrust pastry case filled with a cooked mixture of butter or margarine, brown sugar, milk and flour. The filling is heated until it thickens before being poured into the pastry case and allowed to cool and set. Modern recipes vary in their proportions and ingredients, with some using butter instead of margarine.

The resulting filling has a soft, pudding-like consistency, distinguishing the tart from the harder boiled confectionery also known as butterscotch.

== See also ==
Gypsy tart - a similar desert which is also associated with British schools.
