= Suet cake =

Nutritional supplement for wild birds

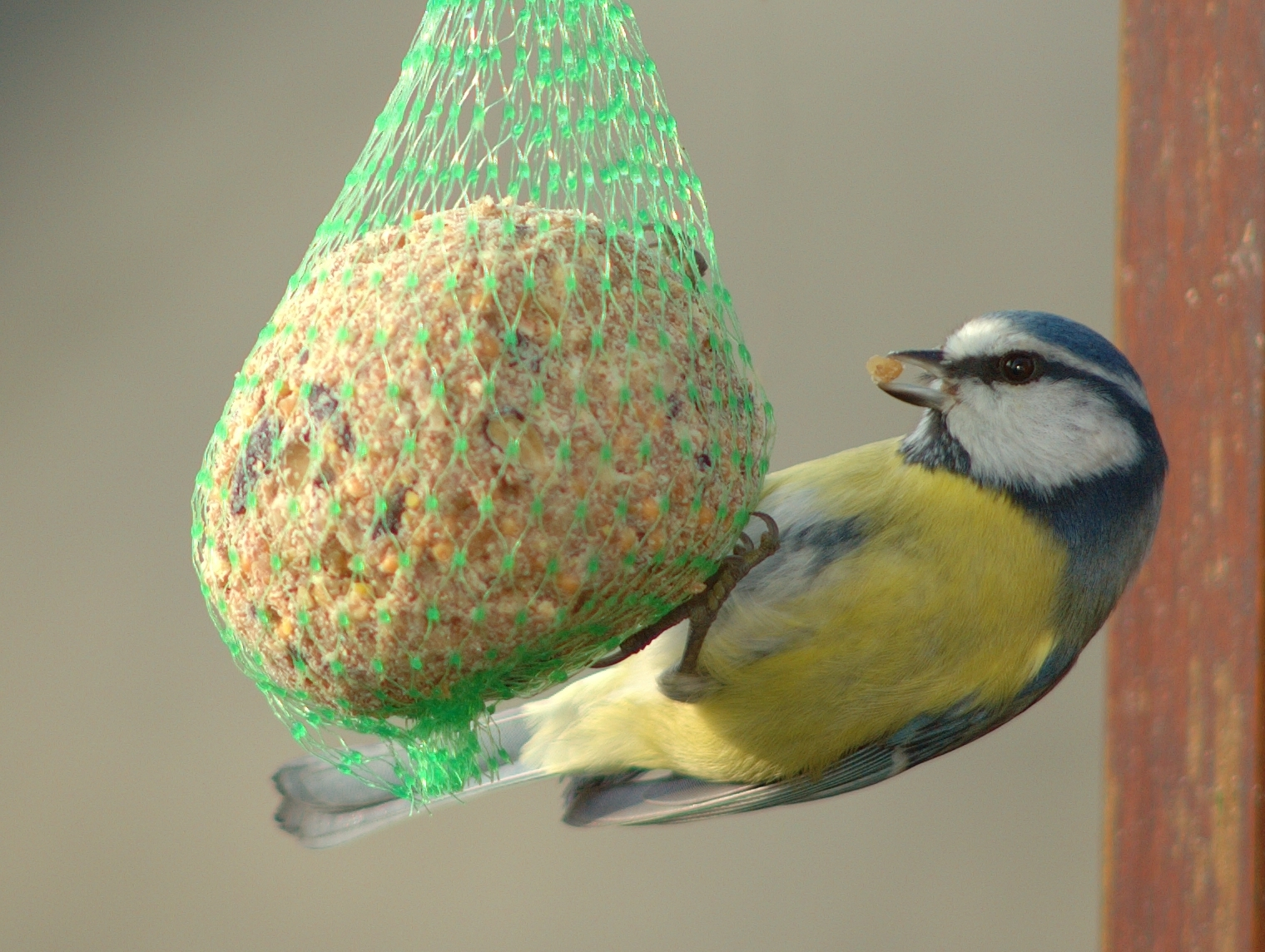
A blue tit feeding on a suet cake

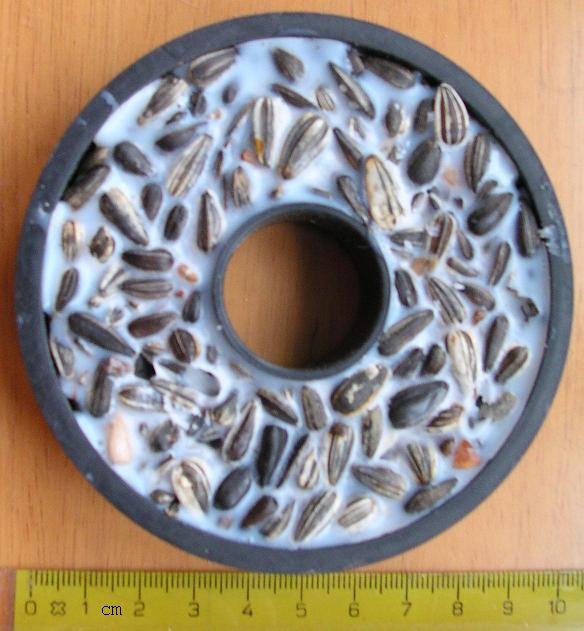
A ring-shaped suet cake is formed in a mold by adding melted fat to a mix of seeds

Suet cakes or fat balls are nutritional supplements for wild birds used in bird feeders. They commonly consist of sunflower seeds and wheat or oat flakes mixed with suet, pork fat, or coconut oil. Further blends may also contain nuts, fruits, mealworms and other insects. In North America, they are one of the most popular choices for bird food, after seed mixes.

Next to balls, which are predominantly common in Northern and Central Europe, suet cakes may take various shapes such as rectangles, rings, or wheels. Fat balls are often sold within a fine plastic net allowing their suspension, such as on branches or in bushes. The nets can, however, be a danger to other species, such as deer, who may find the balls and eat them whole. Other forms of suet cakes can be placed within suspendable cages.

== Composition ==
Suet is the hard fat found around the kidneys and loins of cattle and sheep. Because animal fat is high in energy and easily digested, many birds feed on it, especially in winter. Vegetarian suet cakes can also be fashioned using a mixture of shortening, nut oil, and corn meal. This, however, can be dangerous, as corn and nuts can harbor bacteria.

Suet can be bought from a store or made from scratch. Some companies may sell "no-melt" suet for use in hot areas; the lack of melting is achieved by adding flour and grains. When suet is made from scratch, the maker can pack it into the crevices of pine cones to make a natural feeder. Some bird watchers can even train wild birds to take suet from the hand.

== Species attracted ==
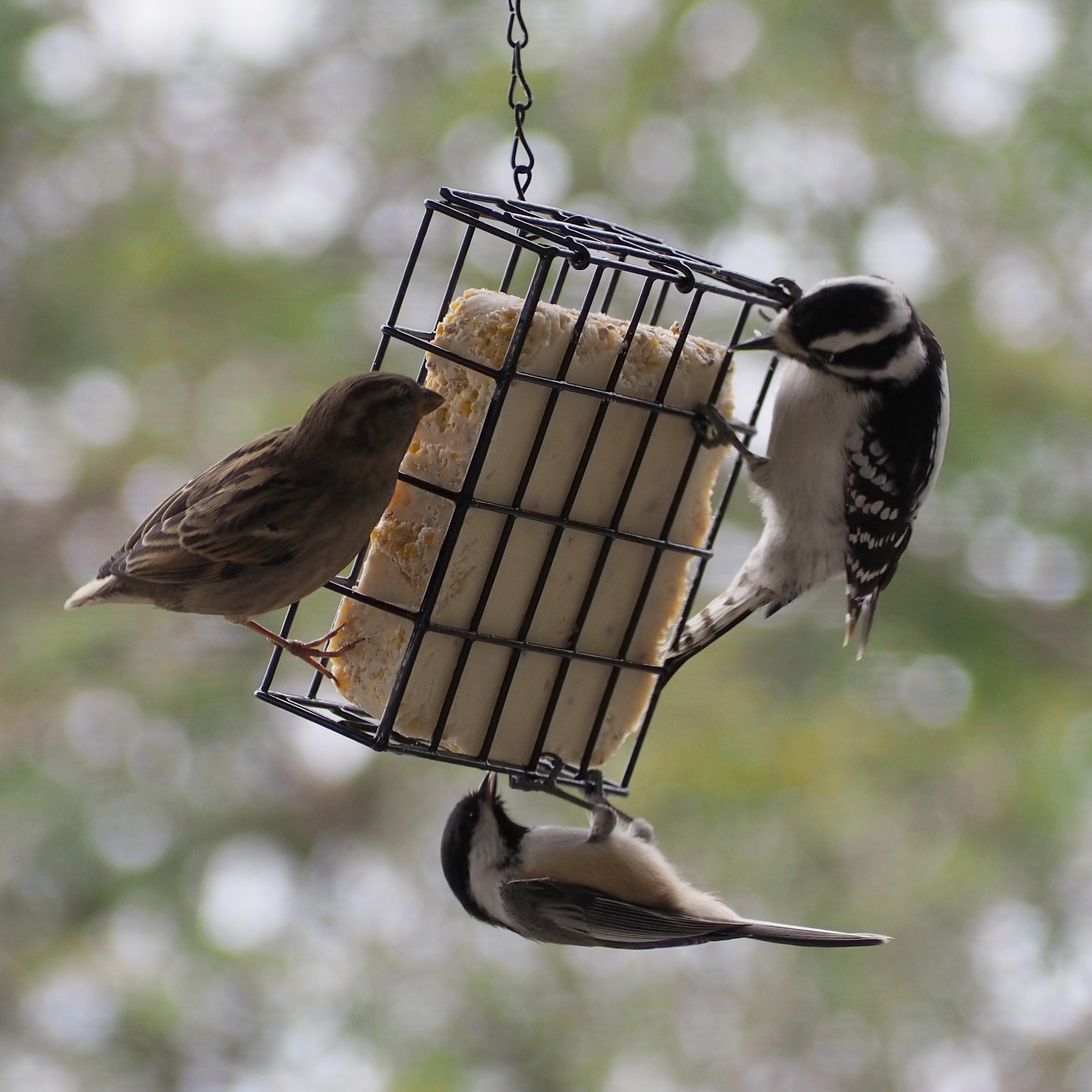
A sparrow, a chickadee, and a woodpecker on a suet feeder in North America

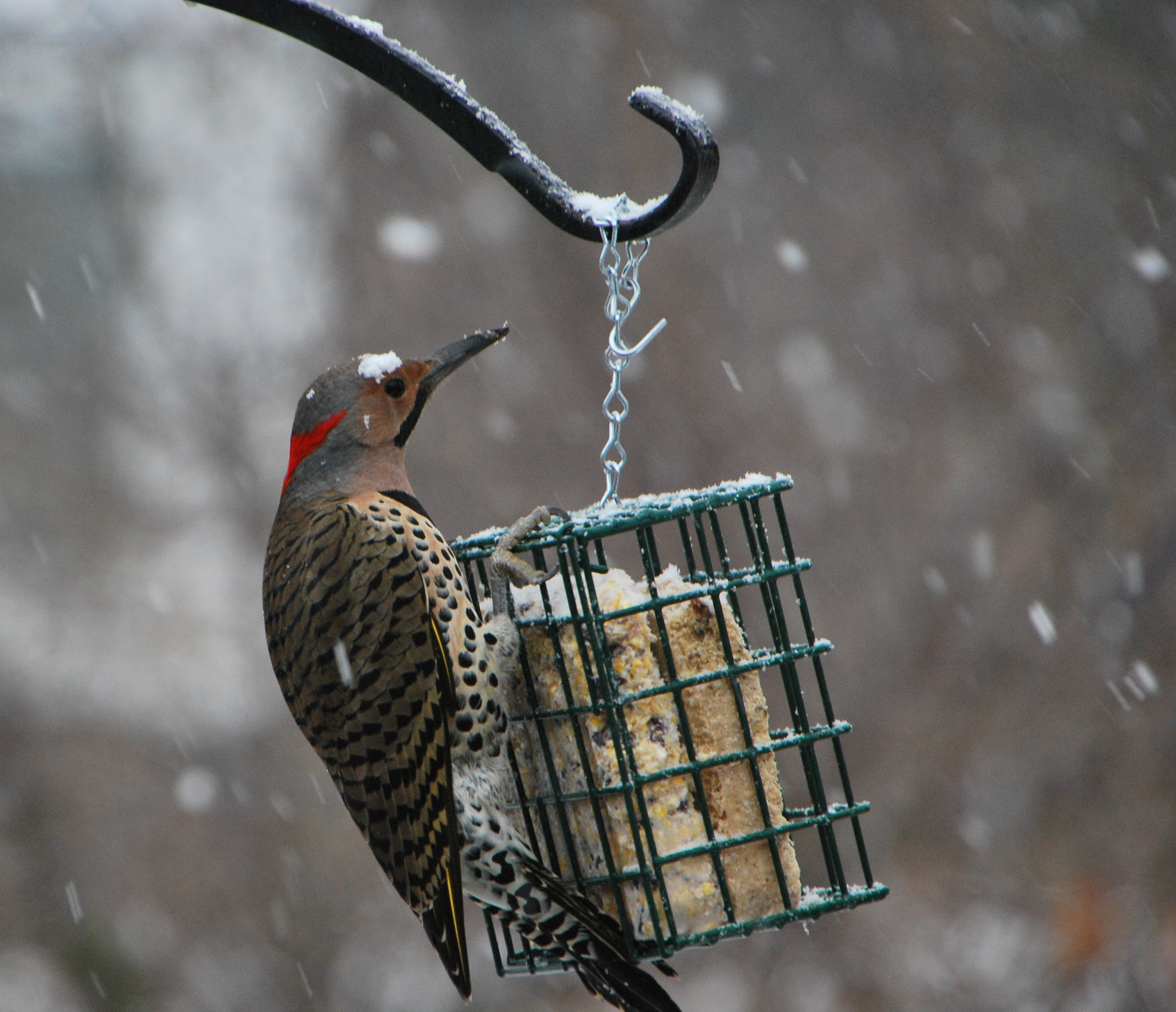
A northern flicker at a suet feeder in winter

In North America, woodpeckers are the most likely birds to be seen at suet feeders, with downy woodpeckers being the most frequently attracted. Insect-eating birds, such as chickadees, wrens, titmice, and nuthatches are also especially fond of these feeders. Still more species that are attracted to suet are Canada jays, goldfinches, juncos, cardinals, thrushes, kinglets, bluebirds, and starlings. As starlings are invasive in North America, some people may hang suet in a way that forces the bird to eat it upside down, since starlings cannot do this, but many native species can.

In addition to birds, peanut butter suet cakes are popular among northern flying squirrels, and have been used as bait by scientists to attract these squirrels for study. Suet is also attractive to black bears, and in areas where bears are known to occur, homeowners are often warned not to leave suet cages up after bears awaken from hibernation.

== Negative effects ==
Woodpeckers that feed on suet year-round are prone to feather loss. This is because suet melts in warm weather, and the birds' head and breast can get matted with sticky melted suet, resulting in bald patches. This can also suffocate eggs, as suet on the incubating bird's breast may clog the pores in eggs that allow oxygen to get in.
