= List of Michelin-starred restaurants in Hungary =

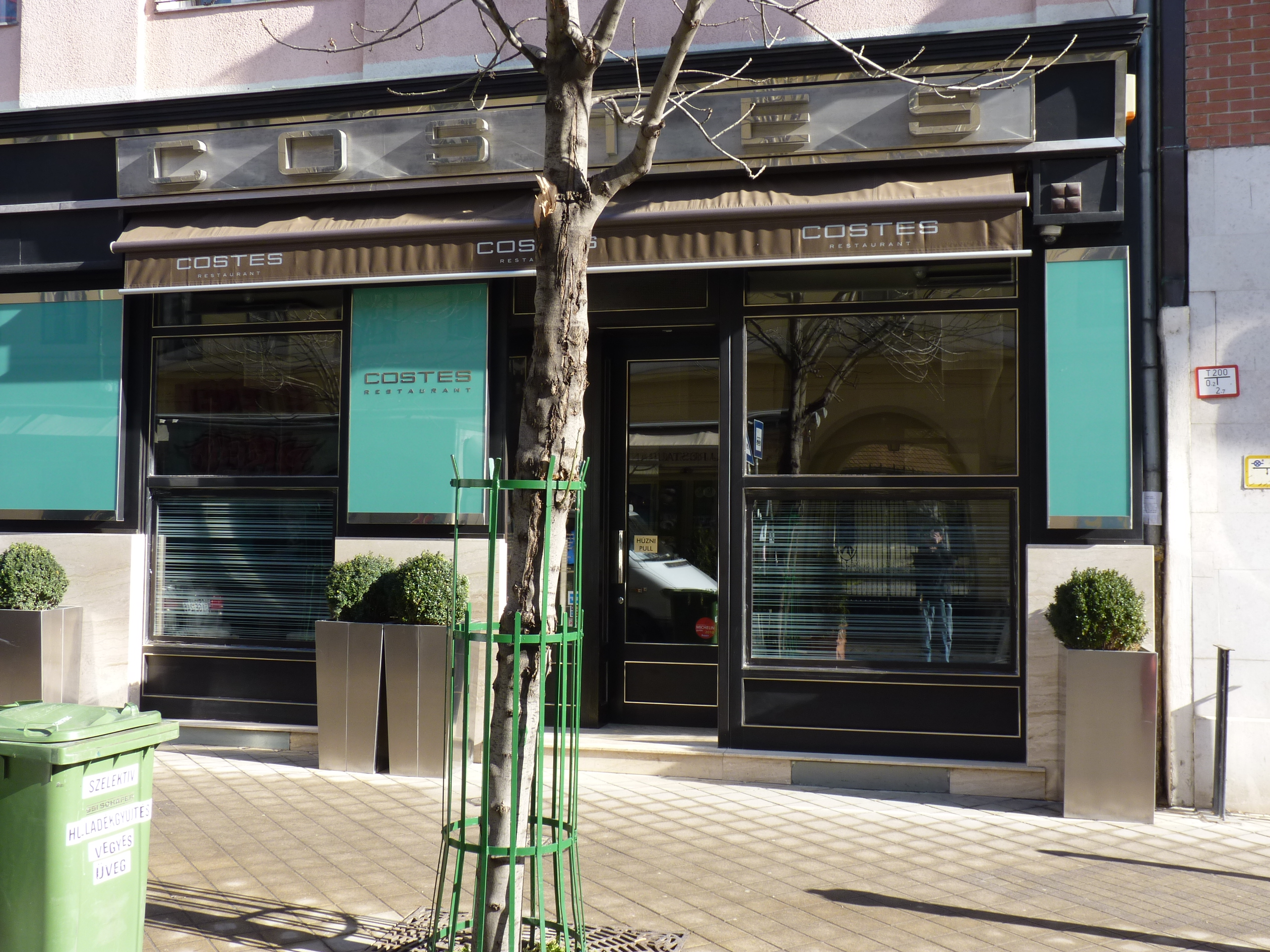
Exterior of Costes, a one-star restaurant

In the 2025 Michelin Guide, there are 10 restaurants in Hungary with a Michelin-star rating. The Michelin Guides have been published by the French tyre company Michelin since 1900. They were created to provide drivers with all the necessary information for travelling, including recommended eateries. In the 1920s, Michelin began sending undercover inspectors to restaurants and awarding Michelin stars to the best-rated ones. Over time, Michelin stars became the most prestigious award restaurants can achieve.

Before stars are given, restaurants are visited multiple times by different anonymous Michelin Inspectors. They rate the restaurants' food on five criteria: the quality of ingredients, mastery of flavour and cooking techniques, the personality of the chef represented in the dining experience, balance and harmony of the flavours, and consistency between visits. Inspectors have at least ten years of experience. (Note: In 2008, The Guardian wrote that five years of experience were necessary.) They create a list of popular restaurants supported by media reports, reviews, and diner popularity, for inspection. If the Michelin Inspectors reach a consensus, Michelin awards the restaurant between one and three stars. One star means "high-quality cooking, worth a stop", two stars signify "excellent cooking, worth a detour", and three stars denote "exceptional cuisine, worth a special journey". The stars are not permanent and restaurants are continuously re-evaluated. If the criteria are not met, the restaurant loses one or more of its stars. (Note: According to The Guardian, Pascal Rémy, a former Inspector, stated that although each restaurant in the Guide is meant to be inspected every 18 months, they are often only revisited every three and a half years.)

Michelin Guide Hungary launched in 2022 with support from the Malta Tourism Authority (MTA), although Michelin had reviewed just the city of Budapest for many years prior as part of The Michelin Guide Main Cities of Europe edition with the first Hungarian restaurant to receive a star being Costes in 2010.

== 2022–2025 nationwide lists ==
Key
1 Michelin star	One Michelin star
2 Michelin stars	Two Michelin stars
—	The restaurant did not receive a star that year

Michelin-starred restaurants
Name	Cuisine	Location	2022	2023	2024	2025
42	Modern	Esztergom	1 Michelin star	1 Michelin star	1 Michelin star	1 Michelin star
Babel	Modern	Budapest – Pest	1 Michelin star	1 Michelin star	1 Michelin star	1 Michelin star
Borkonyha Winekitchen	Modern	Budapest – Pest	1 Michelin star	1 Michelin star	1 Michelin star	1 Michelin star
Costes	Modern	Budapest – Pest	1 Michelin star	1 Michelin star	1 Michelin star	1 Michelin star
essência	Modern	Budapest – Pest	1 Michelin star	1 Michelin star	1 Michelin star	1 Michelin star
Pajta	Modern	Őriszentpéter	—	—	1 Michelin star	1 Michelin star
Platán Gourmet	Creative	Tata	2 Michelin stars	2 Michelin stars	2 Michelin stars	2 Michelin stars
Rumour	Creative	Budapest – Pest	1 Michelin star	1 Michelin star	1 Michelin star	1 Michelin star
Salt	Modern	Budapest – Pest	1 Michelin star	1 Michelin star	1 Michelin star	1 Michelin star
Stand	Modern	Budapest – Pest	2 Michelin stars	2 Michelin stars	2 Michelin stars	2 Michelin stars
Reference						

== 2010–2021 Budapest-only lists ==
Before 2022, Michelin only reviewed the city of Budapest.

Key
1 Michelin star	One Michelin star
2 Michelin stars	Two Michelin stars
—	The restaurant did not receive a star that year

Michelin-starred restaurants
Name	Cuisine	Location	2010	2011	2012	2013	2014	2015	2016	2017	2018	2019	2020	2021
Babel	Modern	Budapest – Pest	—	—	—	—	—	—	—	—	—	1 Michelin star	1 Michelin star	1 Michelin star
Borkonyha Winekitchen	Modern	Budapest – Pest	—	—	—	—	1 Michelin star	1 Michelin star	1 Michelin star	1 Michelin star	1 Michelin star	1 Michelin star	1 Michelin star	1 Michelin star
Costes	Modern	Budapest – Pest	1 Michelin star	1 Michelin star	1 Michelin star	1 Michelin star	1 Michelin star	1 Michelin star	1 Michelin star	1 Michelin star	1 Michelin star	1 Michelin star	1 Michelin star	1 Michelin star
Costes Downtown	Modern	Budapest – Pest	—	—	—	—	—	—	1 Michelin star	1 Michelin star	1 Michelin star	1 Michelin star	1 Michelin star	1 Michelin star
essência	Modern	Budapest – Pest	—	—	—	—	—	—	—	—	—	—	—	1 Michelin star
Onyx	Modern	Budapest – Pest	—	1 Michelin star	1 Michelin star	1 Michelin star	1 Michelin star	1 Michelin star	1 Michelin star	1 Michelin star	2 Michelin stars	2 Michelin stars	2 Michelin stars	—
Salt	Modern	Budapest – Pest	—	—	—	—	—	—	—	—	—	—	—	1 Michelin star
Stand	Modern	Budapest – Pest	—	—	—	—	—	—	—	—	—	1 Michelin star	1 Michelin star	1 Michelin star
Tanti	Modern	Budapest – Buda	—	—	—	—	—	1 Michelin star	1 Michelin star	—	—	—	—	—
Reference														

== See also ==
- List of restaurants in Hungary

== Bibliography ==
- Michelin Guide Main Cities of Europe 2010. Michelin. 2010. ISBN 978-2-06-714682-2.
- Michelin Guide Main Cities of Europe 2011. Michelin. 2011. ISBN 978-2-06-715347-9.
- Michelin Guide Main Cities of Europe 2012. Michelin. 2012. ISBN 978-2-06-716976-0.
- Michelin Guide Main Cities of Europe 2013. Michelin. 2013. ISBN 978-2-06-718069-7.
- Michelin Guide Main Cities of Europe 2014. Michelin. 2014. ISBN 978-2-06-718904-1.
- Michelin Guide Main Cities of Europe 2015. Michelin. 2015. ISBN 978-2-06-719701-5.
- Michelin Guide Main Cities of Europe 2016. Michelin. 2016. ISBN 978-2-06-720638-0.
- Michelin Guide Main Cities of Europe 2017. Michelin. 2017. ISBN 978-2-06-721475-0.
- Michelin Guide Main Cities of Europe 2018. Michelin. 2018. ISBN 978-2-06-722378-3.
- Michelin Guide Main Cities of Europe 2019. Michelin. 2019. ISBN 978-2-06-723050-7.
- Michelin Guide Main Cities of Europe 2020. Michelin. 2020. ISBN 978-2-06-724190-9.
