= Steak and kidney pie =

British savoury pie

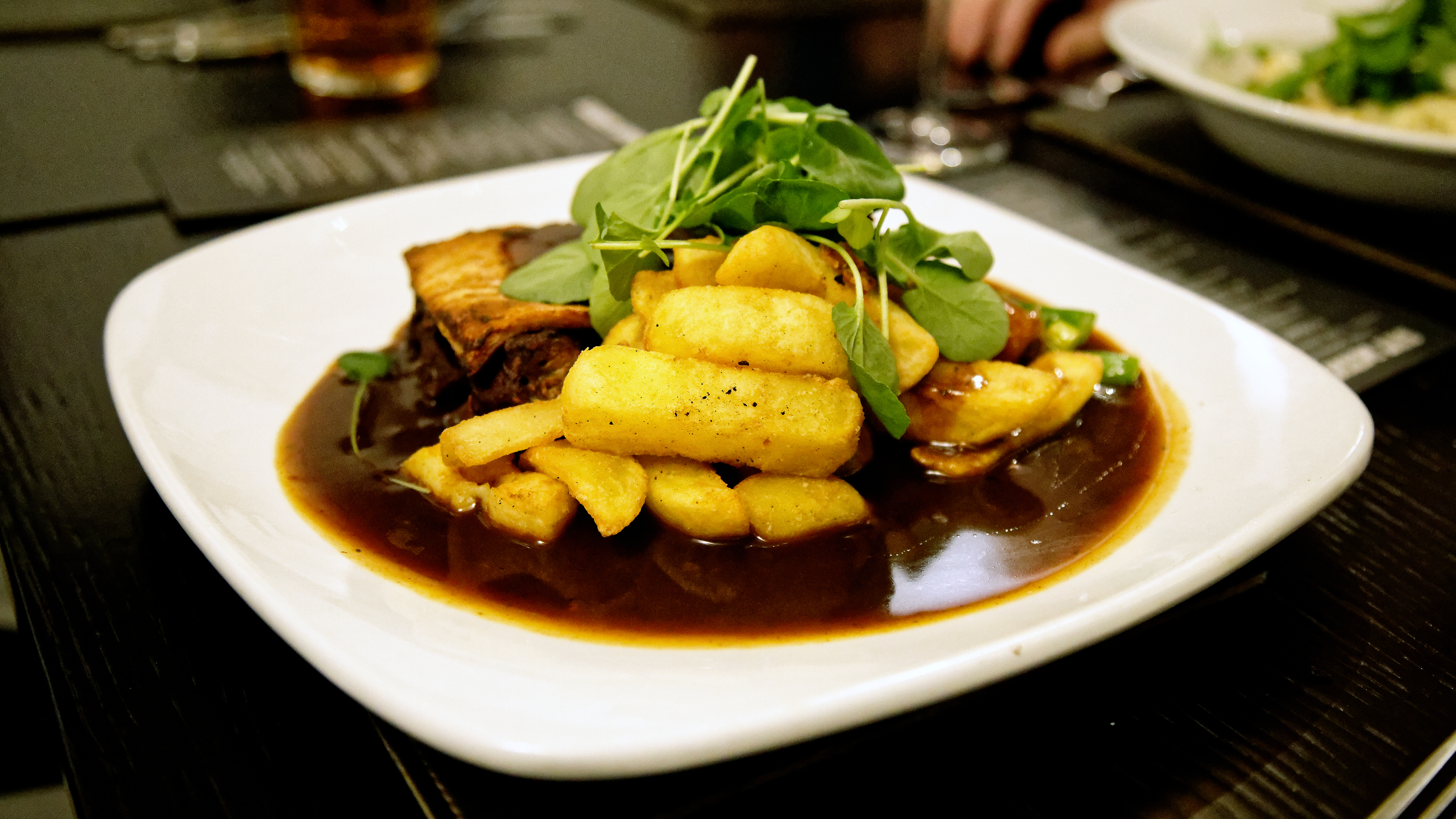
- A steak and kidney pie topped with watercress and served with chips on a bed of gravy
- Type: Savoury pie
- Place of origin: United Kingdom
- Region or state: Great Britain
- Serving temperature: Hot
- Main ingredients: Beef; kidney; onions; brown gravy; pastry shell

Steak and kidney pie is a British dish. It is a savoury pie filled principally with a mixture of diced beef, diced kidney (which may be beef, lamb, veal, or pork) and onion. Its contents are generally similar to those of steak and kidney puddings.

== History and ingredients ==
In modern times the fillings of steak and kidney pies and steak and kidney puddings are generally identical, but until the mid-19th century the norms were steak puddings and kidney pies. (Note: Elizabeth David came across a 17th-century recipe for a "Steake Pye", but unlike modern pies it had no lid, and contained a mixture of beef and mutton.) Bell's Life in London and Sporting Chronicle, 1826, records a large dish of kidney pies in the window of a baker near Smithfield, and ten years later a kidney-pie stand outside what is now the Old Vic, emitting sparks every time the vendor opened his portable oven to hand a hot kidney pie to a customer.

"Rump Steak and Kidney Pie" was served in a Liverpool restaurant in 1847, and in 1863 a Birmingham establishment offered "Beef Steak and Kidney Pie". But until the 1870s kidney pies are far more frequently mentioned in the newspapers, including one thrown at a policeman during an affray in Knightsbridge in 1862, and an assault case in Lambeth in 1867 when a customer attacked a waitress for bringing her a beef pie instead of a kidney one. By the mid-1870s steak and kidney pies were as often mentioned as kidney ones. Both appeared in verse of the period:

You say you are too sad to eat!
Just hand your plate and try
This steak and kidney pie, my love–
This steak and kidney pie.
From Fun, 1875

I've eaten as much as a man could eat,
I've gone through a very remarkable feat;
From the twopenny tart to the kidney pie,
I've swallowed as much as I could, have I.
From The Zoo (1875), by B. C. Stephenson and Arthur Sullivan

According to the cookery writer Jane Grigson, the first published recipe for the combination of steak and kidney was in 1859 in Mrs Beeton's Household Management. (Note: The work was published in book form in 1861, but had appeared as a part-work over the previous two years.) Beeton used it in a pudding rather than a pie. She had been sent the recipe by a correspondent in Sussex in south-east England, and Grigson speculates that it was until then a regional dish, unfamiliar to cooks in other parts of Britain.

Beeton suggested that steak and kidney could be "very much enriched" by the addition of mushrooms or oysters. In those days oysters were the cheaper of the two: mushroom cultivation was still in its infancy in Europe and oysters were still commonplace. In the following century Dorothy Hartley (1954) recommended the use of black-gilled mushrooms rather than oysters, because long cooking is "apt to make [oysters] go hard". (Note: Hartley suggested that if seafood were wanted in a steak-and-kidney mix, cockles would be preferable to oysters.)

Neither Beeton nor Hartley specified the type of animal from which the kidneys were to be used in a steak and kidney recipe. Grigson (1974) calls for either veal or ox kidney, as does Marcus Wareing. Other cooks of modern times have variously specified lamb or sheep kidney (Marguerite Patten, Nigella Lawson and John Torode), ox kidney (Mary Berry, Delia Smith and Hugh Fearnley-Whittingstall), veal kidney (Gordon Ramsay), either pork or lamb (Jamie Oliver), and either ox, lamb or veal kidneys (Gary Rhodes).

== Cooking and variations ==
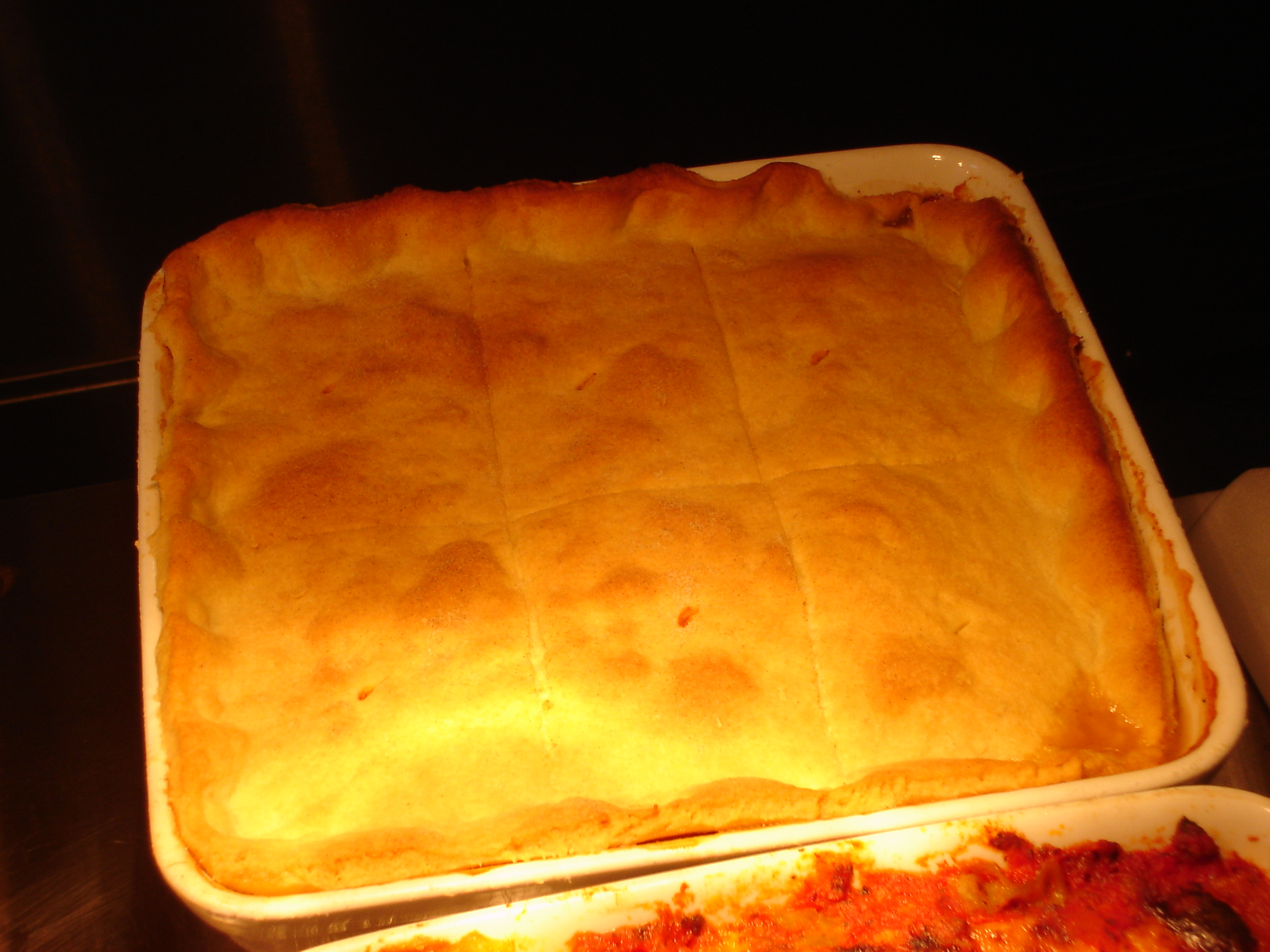
A steak and kidney pie served in a pub

Some versions are full, or "double-crust", pies, in which the cooking dish is lined with pastry before the meat mixture is added, after which a pastry top is put over it. In other versions the meat is put straight into the dish, with only a pastry lid. In either case, a pie funnel is often used to stop the top crust sinking into the meat mixture during baking. Some recipes call for puff pastry; others for shortcrust. In some the meat is cooked before going into the pie; in others it goes in raw. In addition to the steak and kidney, the filling typically contains carrots and onions, and is cooked in one or more of beef stock, red wine and stout.

The steak and kidney pie is found in numerous regional variants. In the West Country clotted or double cream may be poured into the pie through a hole in the pastry topping just before serving. The Ormidale pie from the Scottish Highlands is flavoured with a teaspoon each of Worcestershire sauce, vinegar and tomato sauce. In East Yorkshire sliced potatoes are substituted for kidneys and the dish is called meat and pot pie. In the English Midlands, Northern England and Scotland oysters or mushrooms or both are often added; in Scotland this variant is known as Musselburgh pie.

== Popular culture ==
Among the various vernacular names for steak and kidney pie are Kate and Sidney pie, snake and kiddy pie, and snake and pygmy pie. Eric Partridge dates the first of these to around 1880. A substantial part of the plot of P. G. Wodehouse's 1963 comic novel Stiff Upper Lip, Jeeves hinges on the disruptive allure of a magnificent steak and kidney pie for a young man whose fiancée has decreed that he must turn vegetarian.

== See also ==
- Jellied eels
- List of beef dishes
- List of pies, tarts and flans
- Steak and kidney pudding

== Notes, references and sources ==
=== Sources ===
- Beeton, Isabella (1861). The Book of Household Management. London: S.O. Beeton. OCLC 1045333327.
- Berry, Mary (2006). Mary Berry's Christmas Collection. London: Headline. ISBN 978-0-7553-1562-8.
- Boyd, Lizzie (1977). British Cookery: A Complete Guide to Culinary Practice in the British Isles. London: Croom Helm. ISBN 978-0-85664-851-9.
- David, Elizabeth (2000) [1970]. Spices, Salt and Aromatics in the English Kitchen. London: Grub Street. ISBN 978-1-902304-66-3.
- Davidson, Alan (1999). The Oxford Companion to Food. Oxford: Oxford University Press. ISBN 0-19-211579-0.
- Fearnley-Whittingstall, Hugh (2005). The River Cottage Year. London: Hodder & Stoughton. ISBN 978-0-340-82822-9.
- Grigson, Jane (1992). English Food. London: Ebury Press. ISBN 978-0-09-177043-3.
- Hartley, Dorothy (1999) [1954]. Food in England. London: Macdonald and Jane's. ISBN 978-1-85605-497-3.
- Martin, James (2008). James Martin's Great British Dinners. London: Mitchell Beazley. ISBN 978-1-84533-582-3.
- Partridge, Eric (2009). A Dictionary of Historical Slang. London: Penguin. ISBN 978-0-14-051046-1.
- Patten, Marguerite (1958). Learning to Cook with Marguerite Patten. London: Pan. ISBN 978-0-330-23025-4.
- Ramsay, Gordon (2009). Gordon Ramsay's Great British Pub Food. London: HarperCollins. ISBN 978-0-00-728982-0.
- Rhodes, Gary (1994). Rhodes Around Britain. London: BBC Books. ISBN 978-0-563-36440-5.
- Rhodes, Gary (1997). Fabulous Food. London: BBC Books. ISBN 978-0-563-38385-7.
- Torode, John (2008). Beef. London: Quadrille. ISBN 978-1-84400-690-8.
- Willan, Anne (1979). Grand Diplôme Cooking Course. Danbury: Grolier. OCLC 1035310033.
- Wodehouse, P. G. (1966) [1963]. Stiff Upper Lip, Jeeves. London: Penguin. ISBN 978-0-14-002479-1.
