= List of restaurants in Hungary =

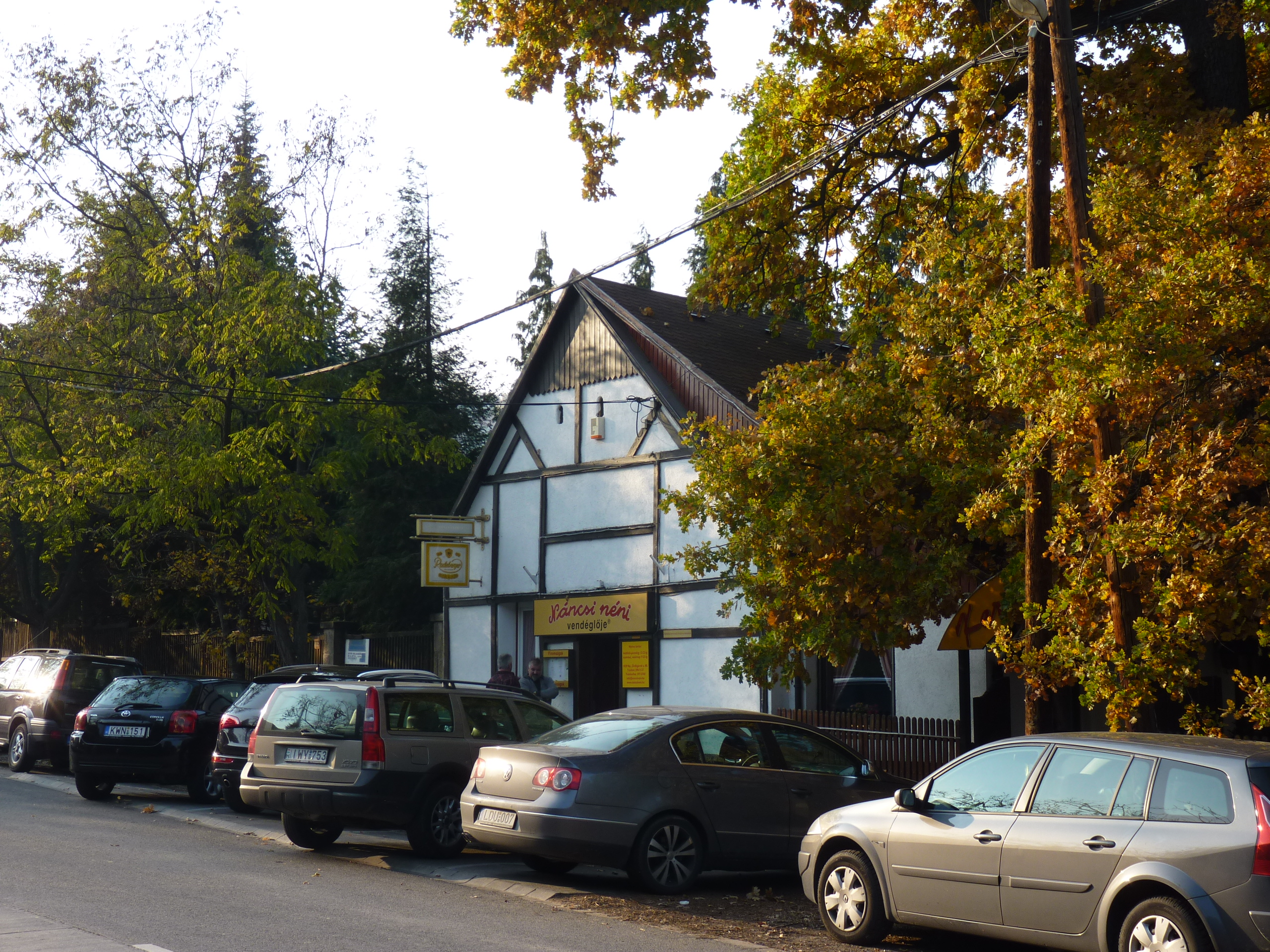
Náncsi Néni

This is a list of notable restaurants in Hungary. This includes all Michelin Guide starred restaurants as of 2023.

== Restaurants in Hungary ==
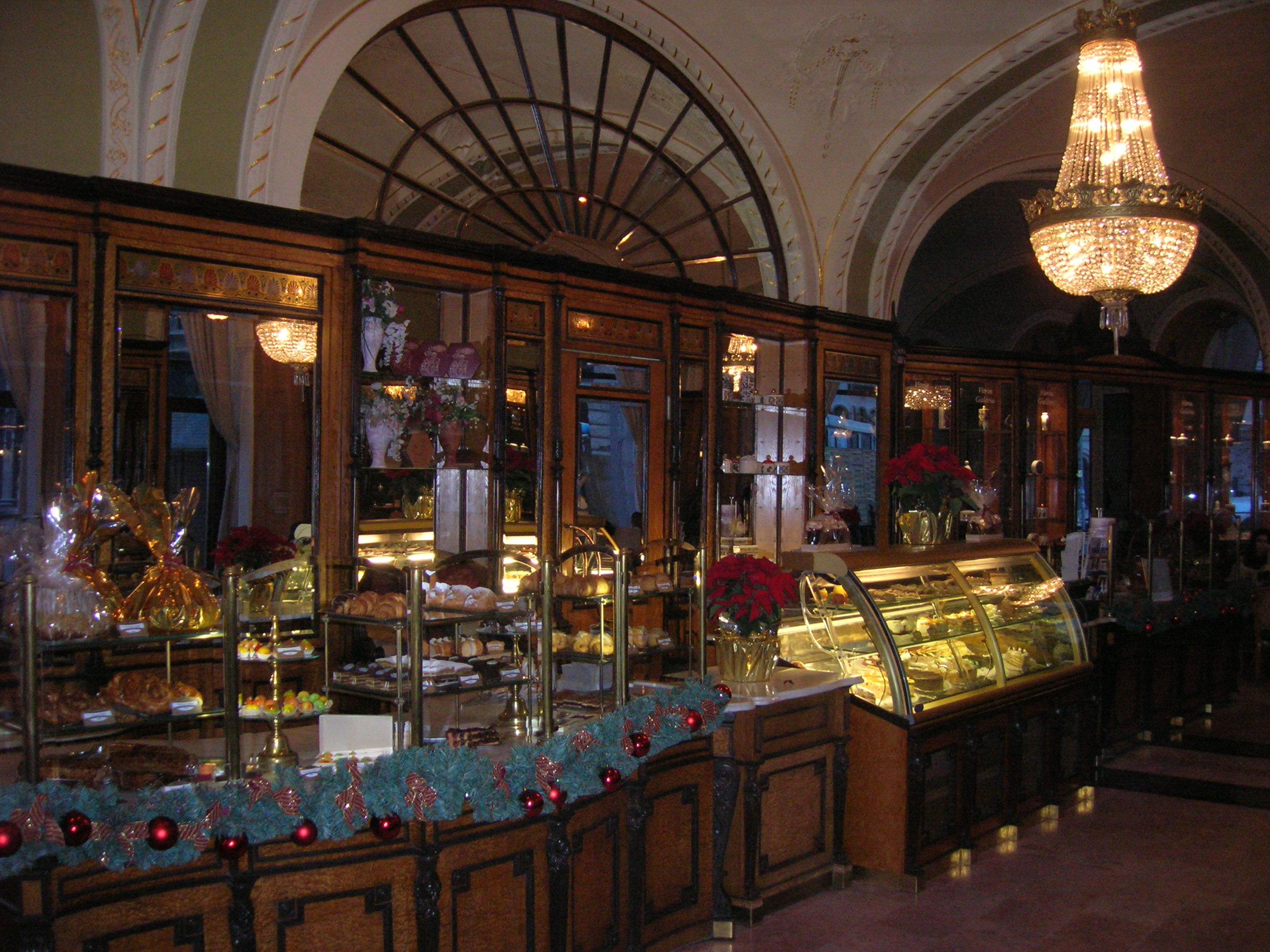
The interior of Café Gerbeaud

Top chefs in Hungary may be winners of the Károly Gundel Prize, established in 2014 in honor of restaurateur Károly Gundel, which recognizes persons "outstandingly successful in the Hungarian hospitality industry for at least 25 years".

=== Budapest ===
- Babel, in Budapest, offers modern cuisine, and is one of Hungary's seven Michelin-1-star-rated (in 2023) restaurants Its walls show evidence of the 1838 Great Flood of Pest.
- Borkonyha Winekitchen, one of Hungary's seven Michelin-1-star-rated (in 2023) restaurants
- Café Gerbeaud
- Costes, one of Hungary's seven Michelin-1-star-rated (in 2023) restaurants
- Essência, offers Portuguese and Hungarian fare, and is one of Hungary's seven Michelin-1-star-rated (in 2023) restaurants
- Gundel, established 1910, located in Budapest's City Park.
- Onyx, Budapest's first 2-star Michelin Guide-rated restaurant (see Hu:Onyx Étterem)
- Rumour, one of Hungary's seven Michelin-1-star-rated (in 2023) restaurants
- Salt, one of Hungary's seven Michelin-1-star-rated (in 2023) restaurants
- Stand, Hungarian cuisine, one of Hungary's two Michelin-2-star-rated (in 2023) restaurants Its two chefs, Szabina Szulló and Tamás Széll, a married couple, were the first Hungarian chefs (and first in Central Europe) to win a Michelin star, at their former restaurant Onyx, and they won the Károly Gundel Prize in 2019. Szell was one of the Hungarian team who won bronze medal in the Bocuse d'Or's 2023 world final; he was previously the first Hungarian to reach the world finals, as winner of the European-level Bocuse d'Or in 2012 and 2016. They are known for their Hungarian goulash.

=== Tata ===
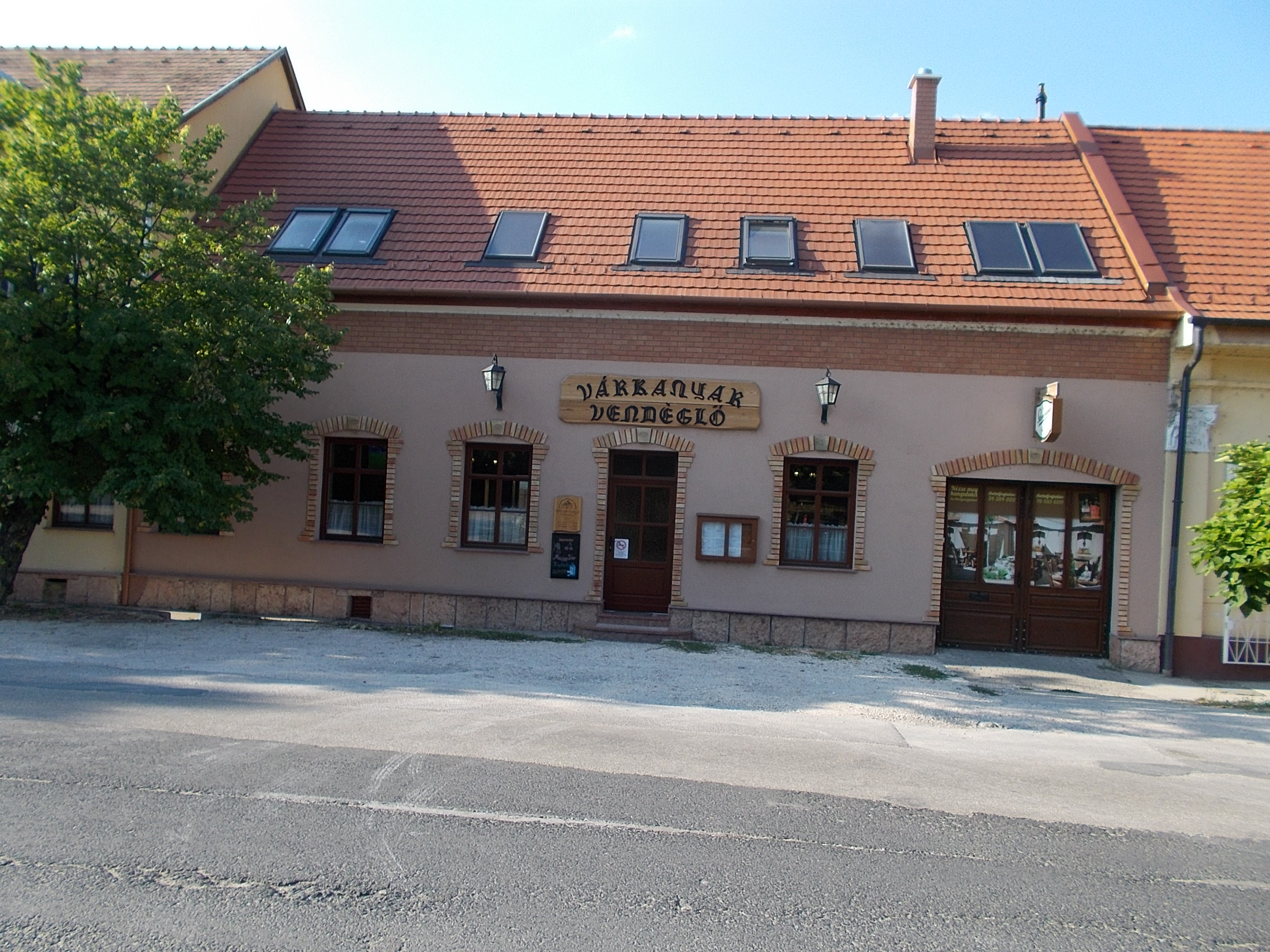
Varkanyar Vendeglo, in Tata

- Platán Gourmet, in Tata (about 70 kilometres (43 mi) northwest of Budapest), one of Hungary's two Michellin-two-star-rated (in 2023) restaurants
- Varkanyar Vendeglo, in a listed historic building near Tata's castle and lake

=== Esztergom ===
- 42, in Esztergom (about 46 kilometres (29 mi) northwest of Budapest), one of Hungary's seven Michelin-1-star-rated (in 2023) restaurants

== See also ==
- Hungarian cuisine
- List of companies of Hungary
- List of Hungarian dishes
- List of Michelin-starred restaurants in Hungary
- Lists of restaurants
