= Bauernfrühstück =

German breakfast dish

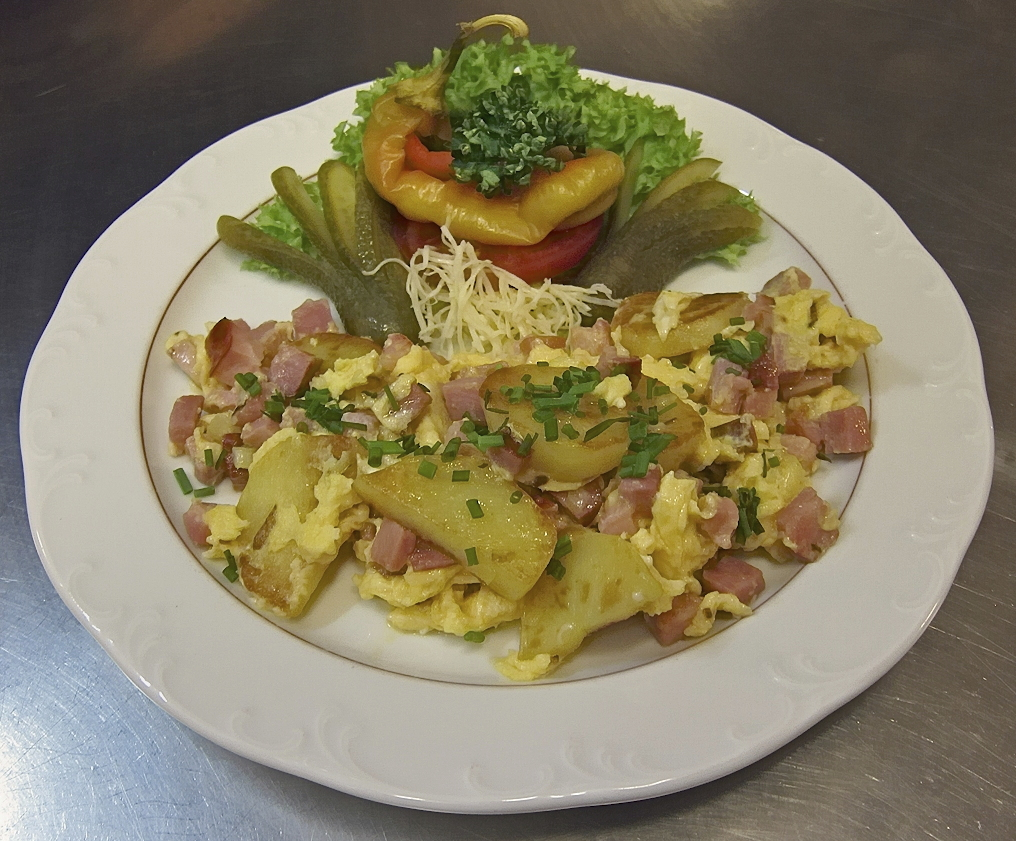
- Course: Breakfast
- Place of origin: Germany
- Main ingredients: Fried potatoes, eggs, cream, parsley, onions, bacon or ham

Bauernfrühstück (German pronunciation: [ˈbaʊ̯ɐnˌfʁyːʃtʏk]; lit. 'farmer's breakfast') is a warm German dish made from fried potatoes, eggs, green onions, parsley, and bacon or ham. Despite its name, it is eaten not only for breakfast but also for lunch and dinner.

== Typical preparation ==
It is similar to the somewhat simpler English bubble and squeak. The ingredients are mixed in a pan and fried as an omelette. It is usually accompanied by a green or tomato salad or gherkins, and rye bread.

== Similar dishes ==
Similar dishes are found in other countries, too. In France, for example, as omelette à la paysanne (with sorrel), in Spain as a tortilla de patatas or in Sweden as pyttipanna.

- Hoppel poppel associated with the cuisine of Minnesota in the Midwestern United States.
- Rumbledethumps, stovies and clapshot from Scotland.
- Bubble and squeak, from England.
- Pyttipanna, Pyttipanne & Pyttipannu - Swedish, Norwegian and Finnish "small pieces in pan".
- Biksemad, from Denmark.
- Trinxat, from the Empordà region of Catalonia, northeast Spain, and Andorra.
- Revuelto Gramajo, from Argentina.
- Roupa Velha (Portuguese for "old clothes"), from Portugal, often made from leftovers from Cozido à Portuguesa. In Spain it is called Ropa Vieja and is made from the remains of the Cocido.
- Stemmelkort, another dish from Germany.
- Stamppot, from the Netherlands.
- Stoemp from Belgium.
- Hash, from the United States.
- Calentado, from Colombia.
- Also, see hash browns and potato cake entries.
