= Suet =

Type of fat found around the loins and kidneys

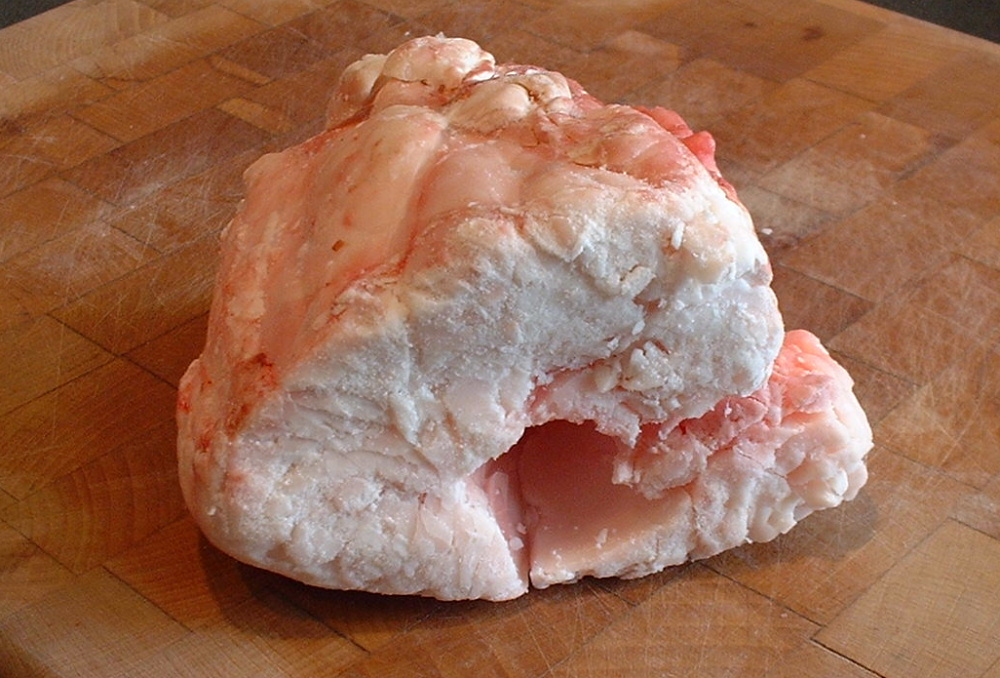
Calf suet

Suet (/ˈs(j)uːɪt/ S(Y)OO-it) is the raw, hard fat of beef, lamb, or mutton found around the loins and kidneys.

Suet has a melting point of between 45 and 50 °C (113 and 122 °F) and solidification (or congelation) between 37 and 40 °C (99 and 104 °F). Its high smoke point makes it ideal for deep frying and pastry production.

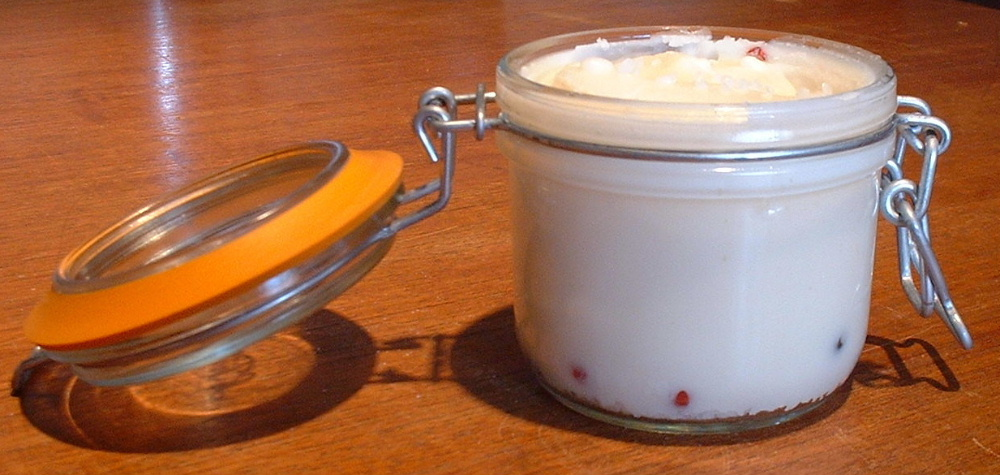
Tallow after rendering

The primary use of suet is in tallow, although it is also used as an ingredient in cooking, especially in traditional baked puddings, such as British Christmas pudding. Suet is rendered into tallow by melting and extended simmering, followed by straining, then cooling. The process may be repeated to refine the product.

== Etymology ==
The word suet /ˈs(j)uːɪt/ is derived from Anglo-Norman siuet, suet, from Old French sieu, seu, from Latin sēbum ('tallow', 'grease', 'hard animal fat'). Sebum is from the Proto-Indo-European root *seyb- ('pour out, trickle'), so it shares a root with sap and soap.

== Use ==
=== In cuisine ===
Suet
Nutritional value per 100 g (3.5 oz)
- Energy: 3,573 kJ (854 kcal)
- Carbohydrates: 0 g
- Fat: 94 g
- Saturated: 52 g
- Monounsaturated: 32 g
- Polyunsaturated: 3 g
- Protein: 1.50 g
Vitamins and minerals
Minerals	Quantity %DV^{†}
Zinc	2% 0.22 mg
- Other constituents: Quantity
- Cholesterol: 68 mg
- Selenium: 0.2 mcg
- Fat percentage can vary.
- ^{†}Percentages estimated using US recommendations for adults.

As suet is the fat from around the kidneys, the connective tissue, blood, and other non-fat content must be removed. It must be refrigerated prior to use and used within a few days of purchase, similar to raw meat.

Pastry made from suet is soft in contrast to the crispness of shortcrust pastry, which makes it ideal for certain sweet and savoury dishes.

Suet is found in several traditional British dishes, such as the sweet baked puddings jam roly-poly and spotted dick. Savoury dishes include dumplings, which are made using a mixture of suet, flour, and water rolled into balls that are added to stews during the final twenty minutes or so of cooking. In the savoury dish steak and kidney pudding, a bowl is lined with a suet pastry, the meat is placed inside and a lid of suet pastry tightly seals the meat. The pudding is then steamed for approximately four hours before serving. Suet is also an ingredient of traditional mincemeat, which is also referred to as "fruit mince".

Due to its high energy content, cold weather explorers use suet to supplement the high daily energy requirement needed to travel in such climates. Typically the food energy requirement is around 21,000–25,000 kilojoules (5,000–6,000 kilocalories) per day for sledge hauling or dog-sled travelling. Suet is added to food rations to increase the fat content and help meet this high energy requirement.

Properties of common cooking fats (per 100 g)
Type of fat	Total fat (g)	Saturated fat (g)	Monounsaturated fat (g)	Polyunsaturated fat (g)	Smoke point
Butter	81	51	21	3	150 °C (302 °F)
Canola oil	100	6–7	62–64	24–26	205 °C (401 °F)
Coconut oil	99	83	6	2	177 °C (351 °F)
Corn oil	100	13–14	27–29	52–54	230 °C (446 °F)
Lard	100	39	45	11	190 °C (374 °F)
Peanut oil	100	16	57	20	225 °C (437 °F)
Olive oil	100	13–19	59–74	6–16	190 °C (374 °F)
Rice bran oil	100	25	38	37	250 °C (482 °F)
Soybean oil	100	15	22	57–58	257 °C (495 °F)
Suet	94	52	32	3	200 °C (392 °F)
Ghee	99	62	29	4	204 °C (399 °F)
Sunflower oil	100	10	20	66	225 °C (437 °F)
Sunflower oil (high oleic)	100	12	84	4	
Vegetable shortening	100	25	41	28	165 °C (329 °F)

==== Suet-based recipes ====
- Christmas pudding
- Clangers
- Clootie dumpling
- Dumplings
- Haggis
- Jamaican patty
- Kishka/Kishke
- Mincemeat
- Pemmican
- Rag pudding
- Spotted dick
- Steak and kidney pudding
- Suet pudding
- Chapli Kabab
- Sussex pond pudding
- Suet-crust pastry
- Windsor pudding

=== In bird feed ===
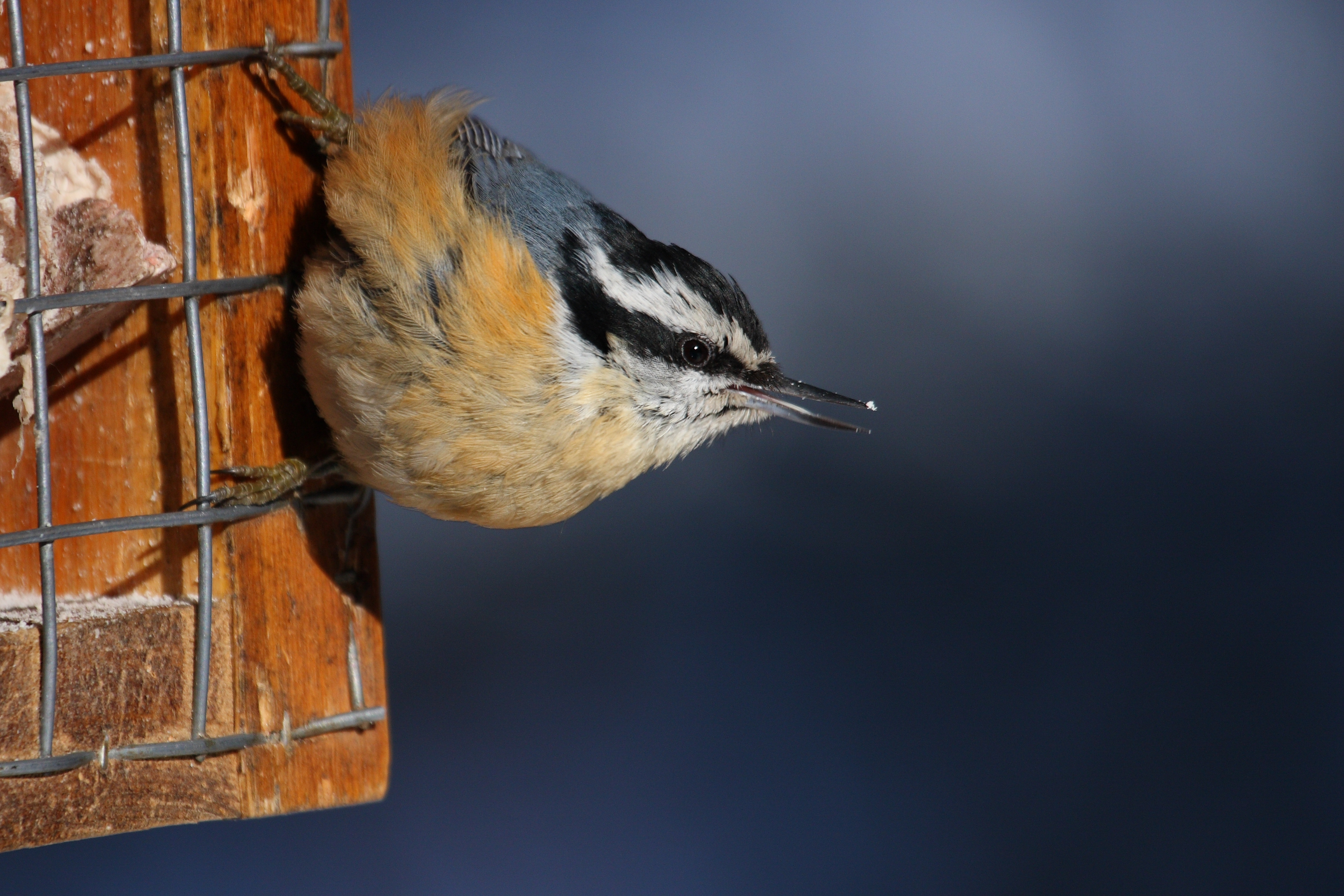
Red-breasted nuthatch feeding on suet

Cakes of suet are popularly used for feeding wild birds and may be made with other solid fats, such as lard. Rolled oats, bird seed, cornmeal, raisins, and unsalted nuts are often incorporated into the suet cakes.

== Availability ==
Pre-packaged suet sold in supermarkets is dehydrated suet. It is mixed with flour to make it stable at room temperature, requiring some care when using it for recipes calling for fresh suet, as the proportions of flour to fat can change. Most modern processed recipes stipulate packaged suet.

Also available is vegetable suet, which is made from refined vegetable oil.

== Cultural and religious restrictions ==
Consumption of suet is forbidden according to Jewish law and it was reserved for ritual altar sacrifices. This restriction only applies to those animals which were used for sacrifices, and thus does not include wild animals such as deer. Maimonides in his book The Guide for the Perplexed, writes that one of the ideas behind this commandment is that the Torah wants to teach people to develop the discipline to avoid very tasty foods that are unhealthy.

== See also ==
- Dripping
- Leaf lard
- Salo (food)
- Schmaltz
- Visceral fat
