= Steak and oyster pie =

Victorian English pie dish

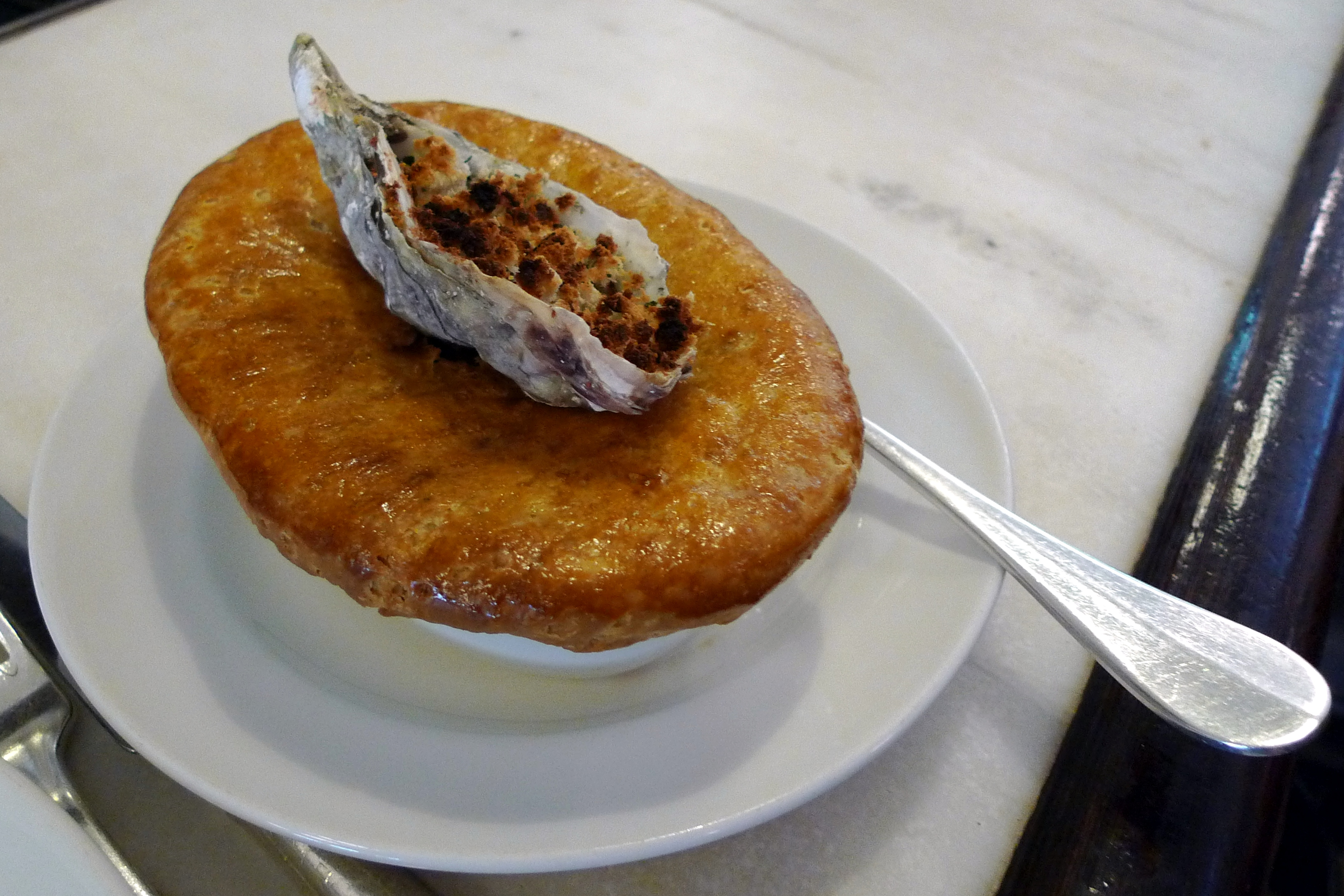
- Alternative names: Beef and oyster pie
- Type: Meat pie
- Place of origin: England
- Main ingredients: Beef, oysters

Steak and oyster pie, also known as beef and oyster pie, is a traditional Victorian English dish. It is also common in Australia and New Zealand. In the United States, it is a regional dish of Norfolk, Virginia. There, neck, flank, round, or rump may be used. It is prepared in a Dutch oven, and is slow-cooked until gelatinous. In New Zealand, steak and oyster pie may be made with Bluff oysters. It may also be made with ale.

== See also ==
- List of pies, tarts and flans
- List of regional dishes of the United States
