= Howard Hillman =

American writer

- Born: United States
- Occupations: Writer, author
- Writing career
- Language: English
- Genres: Travel, cooking, wine

Howard Hillman is an author specializing in travel, cooking, and wine, including a book on kitchen science that has seen three editions. He is a graduate of Harvard Business School, and has written over 25 books. He maintains an extensive website on "Hillman Wonders of the World." He wrote the "longest article ever to appear in The New York Times Travel Section."

== Books ==
- The Diner's Guide to Wines (1978)
- The Book of World Cuisines (ISBN 0-14-004989-4, 1979)
- The Cook's Book (ISBN 0-380-76794-5, 1981)
- Kitchen Science: A Guide to Knowing the Hows and Whys for Fun and Success in the Kitchen, (ISBN 0-395-30533-0, 1981).
  - Revised ed.: Kitchen Science: A Guide to Knowing the Hows and Whys for Fun and Success in the Kitchen, (1989). ISBN 0-395-48072-8
  - Revised/updated ed.: The New Kitchen Science: A Guide to Knowing the Hows and Whys for Fun and Success in the Kitchen, (2003). ISBN 0-618-24963-X
- The Gourmet Guide to Beer (1983, 1988)
- Great Peasant Dishes of the World a.k.a. Great Peasant Dishes (1983)
- Art of Dining Out (ISBN 0-671-46196-6, 1984)
- Howard Hillman's Kitchen Secrets (ISBN 0-02-551610-8, 1985)
