= Stemmelkort =

- Type: Patties
- Place of origin: Germany
- Region or state: Westphalia
- Main ingredients: Carrots
- Ingredients generally used: Eggs, flour, nutmeg, stock, salt and pepper

Stemmelkort are small, fried carrot patties, traditionally from the Westphalia region of Germany. They consist of carrots, eggs, flour, nutmeg, stock, salt and pepper. They are fried in butter and may be served with a meal as an accompaniment, or on their own.

== See also ==
- Bauernfrühstück
- Bubble and squeak
