= China chilo =

Mutton dish from Victorian cuisine

China chilo is a dish of stewed mutton from 19th-century English cuisine. Stewed with onions, peas and lettuce, the mutton is served in a dish surrounded by a border of rice. Scholars believe the term China in the name alludes to this oriental ingredient, but the meaning of the term chilo remains a mystery. The dish is said to be based on a Chinese dish that 19th-century sailors described upon their return from the China Seas. Food historians speculate whether creative Victorian cooks substituted lettuce for bok choy and peas for bean sprouts.

Eliza Acton's recipe in Modern Cookery for Private Families was made with leg (or loin) of mutton, shredded young lettuce, peas, and simple seasonings of salt, pepper, butter and green onion. These were stewed with a little water, and if desires, mushrooms, cucumbers, or curry powder. Acton's recipe is served with a separate dish of boiled rice. Mrs. Beeton, however, gives instructions to serve the mutton stew "the same as for curry," in a dish with a border of rice.

China Chilo is a historic recipe of the Victorian era, not found in modern recipe books. In the early 19th-century cookery book A New System of Domestic Cookery by Maria Rundell it is made by simmering undressed neck of mutton (or leg with its fat) with onions, lettuce, clarified butter and water, and served in the center of a dish encircled with boiled rice.

A menu from 1932 serves the mutton dish with an appetizer soup made from vegetable consomme simmered with the mutton bones and canned tomatoes, of which the broth was used for the soup and the tomatoes themselves for the vegetable casserole for a complete and economical meal. The China chilo is made with neck or any economical cut of mutton, simmered until the meat falls from the bones, with vegetables, and served with rice and fresh parsley.
