= Steak and kidney pudding =

British dish made of stewed steak, ox kidney, and suet pastry

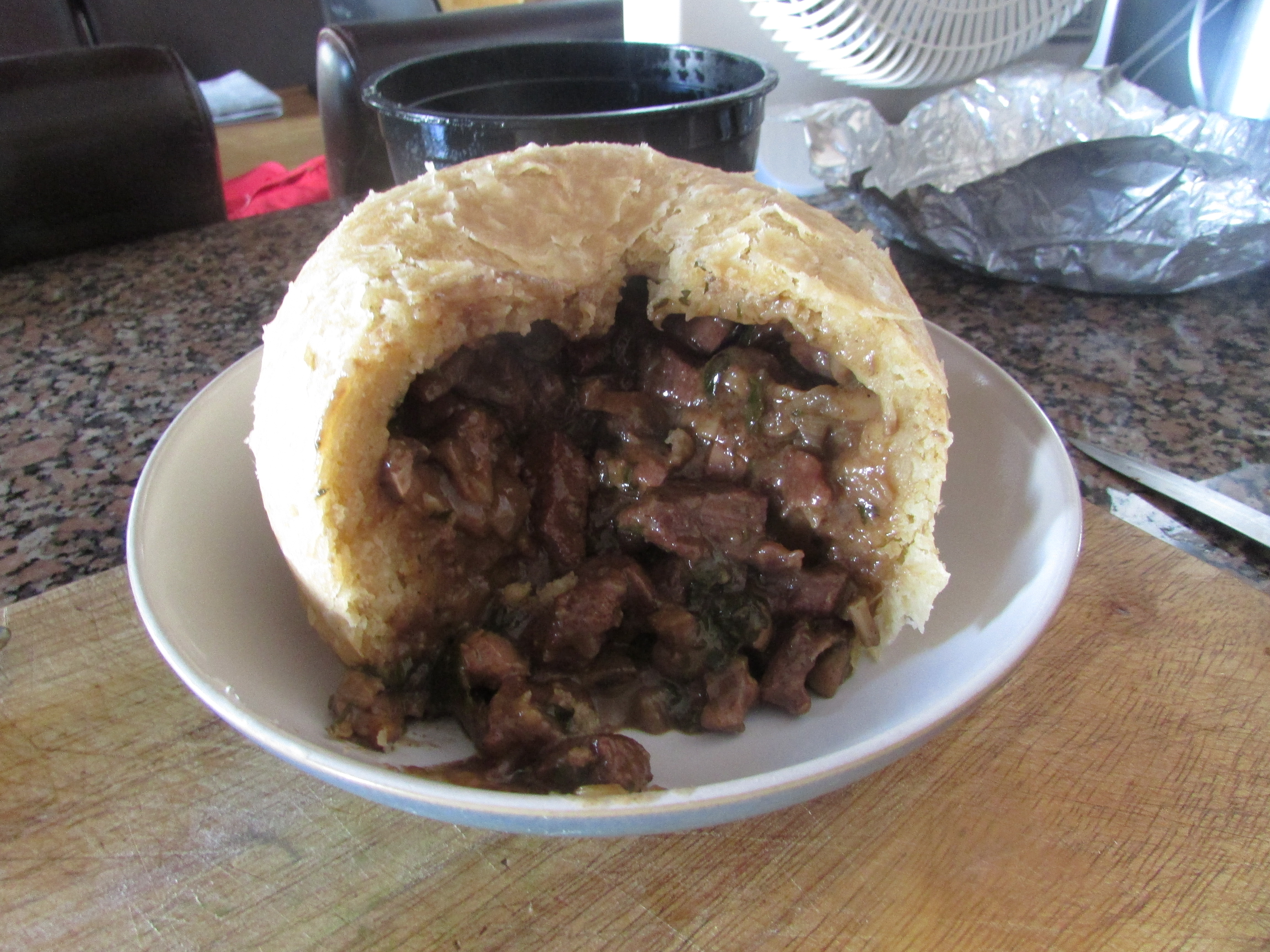
- A homemade steak and kidney pudding, cut open to show the contents
- Type: Pudding
- Place of origin: England
- Main ingredients: Suet pastry; steak; kidney

Steak and kidney pudding is a traditional English main course in which beef steak and beef, veal, pork or lamb kidney are enclosed in suet pastry and slow-steamed on a stovetop.

== History and ingredients ==
Steak puddings (without kidney) were part of British cuisine by the 18th century. Hannah Glasse (1751) gives a recipe for a suet pudding with beef-steak (or mutton). Nearly a century later, Eliza Acton (1846) specifies rump steak for her "Small beef-steak pudding" made with suet pastry, but, like her predecessor, does not include kidney.

An early mention of steak and kidney pudding appears in Bell's New Weekly Messenger on 11 August 1839:

Hardbake, brandy-balls, and syllabubs have given way to "baked-tates" and "trotters;" and the olden piemen are set aside for the Blackfriars-bridge howl of "Hot beef-steak and kidney puddings!"

According to the cookery writer Jane Grigson, the first published recipe to include kidney with the steak in a suet pudding was in 1859 in Mrs Beeton's Household Management. (Note: The work was published in book form in 1861, but had appeared as a part-work over the previous two years.) Beeton had been sent the recipe by a correspondent in Sussex in south-east England, and Grigson speculates that it was until then a regional dish, unfamiliar to cooks in other parts of Britain.

Beeton suggested that the dish could be "very much enriched" by the addition of mushrooms or oysters. In those days, oysters were the cheaper of the two: mushroom cultivation was still in its infancy in Europe and oysters were still commonplace. In the following century, Dorothy Hartley (1954) recommended the use of black-gilled mushrooms rather than oysters, because the long cooking is "apt to make [oysters] go hard". (Note: Hartley suggested that if seafood were wanted in a steak-and-kidney mix, cockles would be preferable to oysters.)

Neither Beeton nor Hartley specified the type of animal from which the kidneys were to be used in a steak and kidney recipe. Grigson (1974) calls for either veal or beef kidney, as does Marcus Wareing. Other cooks of modern times have variously specified lamb or sheep kidney (Marguerite Patten, Nigella Lawson and John Torode), beef kidney (Mary Berry, Delia Smith and Hugh Fearnley-Whittingstall), veal kidney (Gordon Ramsay), either pork or lamb (Jamie Oliver), and either beef, lamb or veal kidneys (Gary Rhodes).

== Cooking ==
The traditional method, given in Beeton's recipe, calls for the meat to be put raw into a pastry-lined pudding basin, sealed with a pastry lid, covered with a cloth and steamed in a pan of simmering water for several hours. In Grigson's view, "one gets a better, less sodden crust if the filling is cooked first", and, after Hartley's, all the recipes from recent years mentioned above follow suit. In a 2012 article "How to cook the perfect steak and kidney pudding", Felicity Cloake identified one relatively modern recipe, by Constance Spry, that calls for the meat to go in raw, but found that it "comes out gloopy with flour, and tough as a Victorian boarding school". In addition to the steak and kidney, the filling typically contains carrots and onions, and is pre-cooked in one or more of beef stock, red wine and stout.

== Nicknames ==
According to the Oxford Companion to Food, cockneys call steak and kidney pudding "Kate and Sydney Pud". In the slang of the British Armed Forces and some parts of North West England, the puddings are called "babbies' heads".

== Notes, references and sources ==
=== Sources ===
- Acton, Eliza (1846). Modern Cookery, in All its Branches. London: Longman, Brown, Green, and Longmans. OCLC 969517810.
- Beeton, Isabella (1861). The Book of Household Management. London: S.O. Beeton. OCLC 1045333327.
- Berry, Mary (2006). Mary Berry's Christmas Collection. London: Headline. ISBN 978-0-7553-1562-8.
- Davidson, Alan (1999). The Oxford Companion to Food. Oxford: Oxford University Press. ISBN 0-19-211579-0.
- Fearnley-Whittingstall, Hugh (2005). The River Cottage Year. London: Hodder & Stoughton. ISBN 978-0-340-82822-9.
- Glasse, Hannah (1751). The Art of Cookery Made Plain and Easy. London: Hannah Glasse. OCLC 1155400954.
- Grigson, Jane (1992). English Food. London: Ebury Press. ISBN 978-0-09-177043-3.
- Hartley, Dorothy (1999) [1954]. Food in England. London: Macdonald and Jane's. ISBN 978-1-85605-497-3.
- Ramsay, Gordon (2009). Gordon Ramsay's Great British Pub Food. London: HarperCollins. ISBN 978-0-00-728982-0.
- Rhodes, Gary (1994). Rhodes Around Britain. London: BBC Books. ISBN 978-0-563-36440-5.
- Rhodes, Gary (1997). Fabulous Food. London: BBC Books. ISBN 978-0-563-38385-7.
- Patten, Marguerite (1958). Learning to Cook with Marguerite Patten. London: Pan. ISBN 978-0-330-23025-4.
- Seal, Graham; Blake, Lloyd (2013). Century of Silent Service. Salisbury, Queensland: Boolarong Press. ISBN 978-1-922-10989-7.
- Torode, John (2008). Beef. London: Quadrille. ISBN 978-1-84400-690-8.

== See also ==
- List of beef dishes
- List of steak dishes
- List of steamed foods
- Steak and kidney pie
- Suet pudding
