= Costes (restaurant) =

Restaurant in Budapest

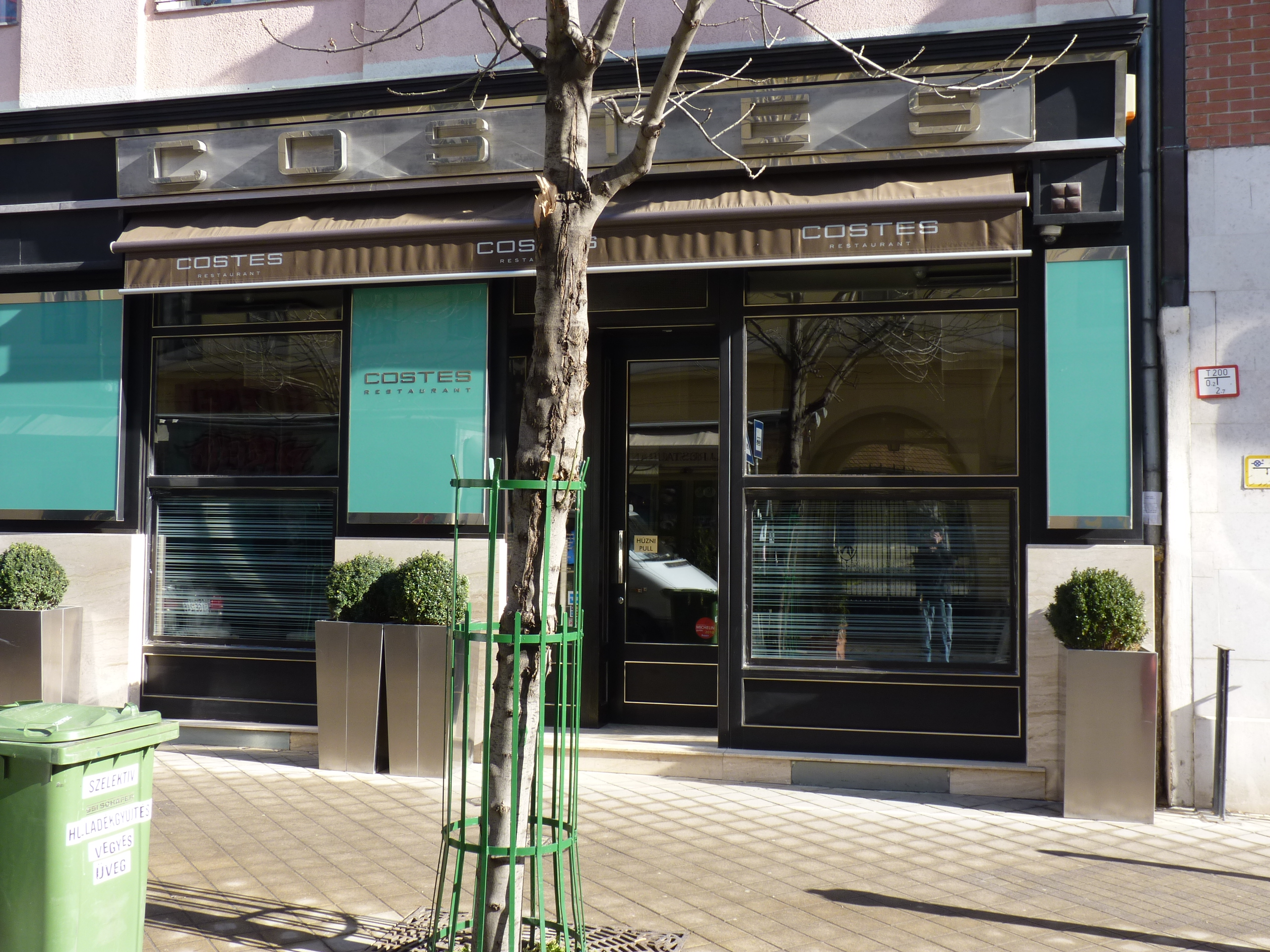
The restaurant in 2011

Costes is a Michelin-starred restaurant in Budapest, Hungary. The head chef of the restaurant is Jenő Rácz.

== Background ==
In 2010, it became the first Hungarian restaurant to be awarded a Michelin star. Locally sourced food is one of the restaurant's selling points. Duck is sourced from the Kunság region, wine from Tokaj wine region, and catfish from Lake Fertő; the restaurant also serves Mangalica pork. Dairy products are also sourced domestically. The restaurant's menu is dictated by local seasons; when asked about this, the head chef cited inspiration from childhood favourites. Tasting menues at the restaurant cost around EUR 110 per head in 2025. The restaurant has a secondary location called Costes Downtown with a lighter atmosphere, opened in 2015.

During the COVID-19 pandemic, the restaurant operated with dining cars inside of a ferris wheel, to comply with social-distancing rules. Guests were given their own carriage, with a four course-meal of "braised oxtail and duck liver, slightly cured pike perch, prime rib, and poached pear 'belle Hélène'".

== See also ==
- List of Michelin-starred restaurants in Hungary
- List of restaurants in Hungary
