= Gypsy tart =

Tart originating from the Isle of Sheppey in Kent, United Kingdom

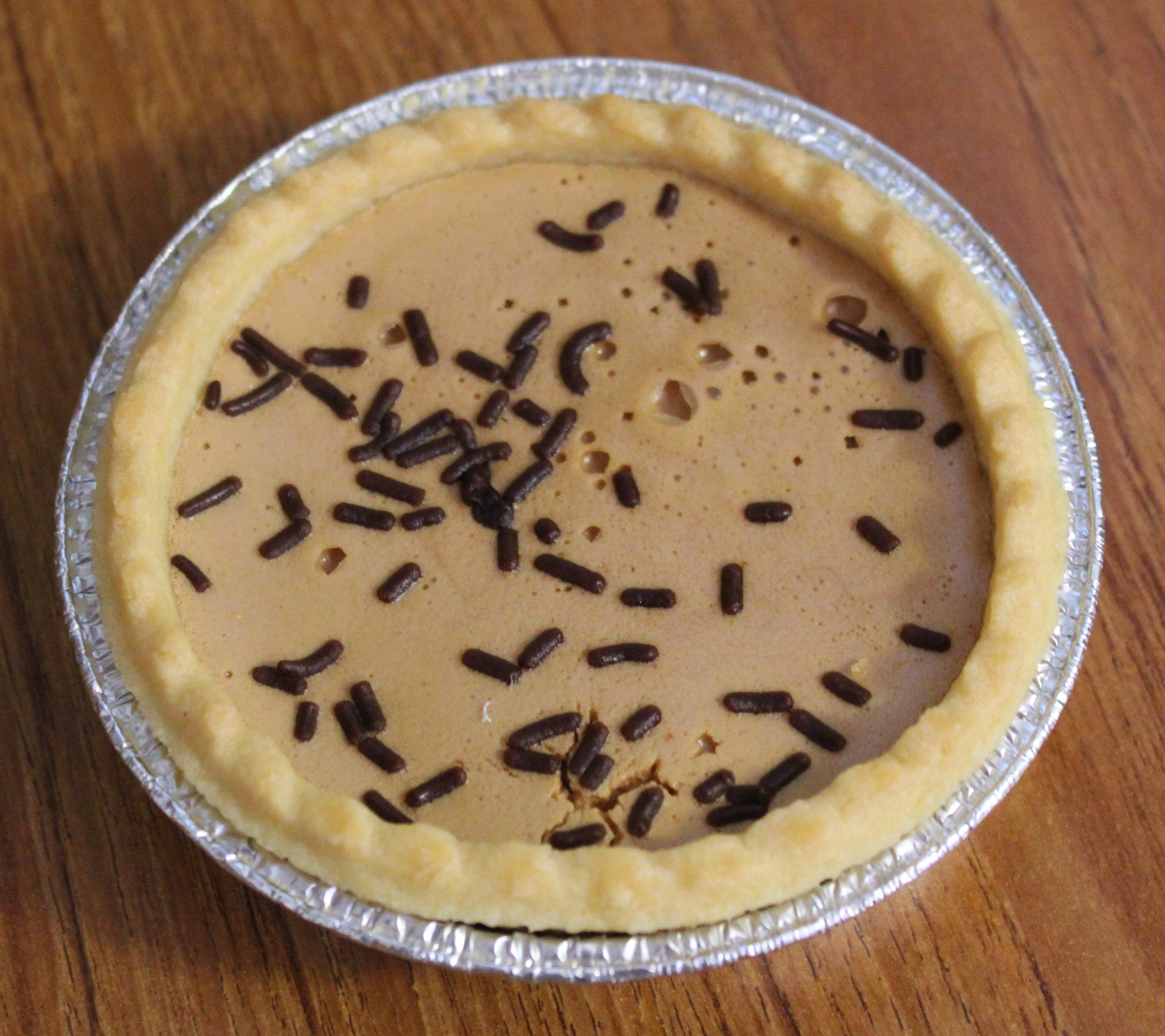
- Type: Tart
- Place of origin: England
- Region or state: Kent
- Serving temperature: Dessert
- Main ingredients: Pastry, evaporated milk or condensed milk, muscovado sugar or brown sugar

A gypsy tart is a type of tart made with evaporated milk, muscovado sugar (though some varieties include light brown sugar), and pastry. It originates from the county of Kent.

The tart is extremely sweet and is, for many people, associated with school dinners. Although most commonly made with evaporated milk, condensed milk may be used in its place. This makes for a firmer and even sweeter tart, with a darker colour. A legend says that a woman invented the tart to feed hungry Romani children.

Keith Richards was forced to eat it in school. When he tried to discard it, he had to write the lines, "I will not refuse food".
