= Marguerite Patten =

English food writer and broadcaster

Marguerite Patten CBE
- Born: Hilda Elsie Marguerite Brown; 4 November 1915; Bath, Somerset, England, UK
- Died: 4 June 2015 (aged 99); Twickenham, Greater London, England, UK
- Occupations: Home economist, food writer and broadcaster
- Notable work: Everyday Cook Book in Colour (1961)
- Spouse: Bob Patten (1942–97, his death)
- Children: 1
- Awards: OBE 1991; CBE 2010; Lifetime Achievement Award from BBC, 1998; Lifetime Achievement Award from Waterford Wedgewood, 1999; Woman of the Year Lifetime Achievement Award 2007

Hilda Elsie Marguerite Patten, CBE (née Brown; 4 November 1915 – 4 June 2015), was a British home economist, food writer and broadcaster. She was one of the earliest celebrity chefs (a term that she disliked at first) who became known during World War II thanks to her programme on BBC Radio, where she shared recipes that could work within the limits imposed by war rationing. After the war, she was responsible for popularising the use of pressure cookers and her 170 published books have sold over 17 million copies.

== Early life and career ==
Born in Bath, Somerset, she was raised in Barnet, Hertfordshire, where she won a scholarship to Queen Elizabeth's Grammar School for Girls (now Queen Elizabeth's School for Girls). Patten was 12 when she began to cook for her mother and younger brother and sister after her father, who was a printer, died, and her mother had to return to work as a teacher. While she was not the primary cook for the family, she did take an interest in cooking from that age onwards. After leaving school, she worked as an actress in repertory theatre for nine months, and then as a senior home economist for Frigidaire, promoting the benefits of the refrigerator.

== Second World War ==
During World War II, she worked for the Ministry of Food suggesting nourishing and inventive recipes using the rationed food that was available. She broadcast her ideas and advice to the nation on a BBC radio programme called the Kitchen Front. When the war ended, she demonstrated kitchen appliances for Harrods, including the pressure cooker which her work popularised in the UK.

== Television and radio ==
Following from her wartime appearances, she appeared on many BBC radio programmes, included Woman's Hour from 1946 until the 2000s.

The TV programmes on which she appeared regularly included the first UK TV magazine programme Designed for Women (1947 - 1960) and Cookery Club (1956 - 1961). She was one of the earliest TV 'celebrity chefs' – a description with which she disagreed saying "I am NOT! To the day I die I'll be a home economist", presenting her first television cookery programme on the BBC in 1947. However, Patten seemed to have relaxed this stance later in life, describing herself as "the first Television Cook in Britain."

She appeared on television some eight years before Fanny Cradock, whom she disliked and called a "bully", but whose ability to cook she appreciated. Patten did cookery demonstrations, once touring the world, and also appearing at the London Palladium on 12 occasions.

== Books ==
Patten wrote many best-selling cookery books. In 1961, her publisher Paul Hamlyn produced a glossy book, Cookery In Colour, that proved influential on later publications. The Everyday Cook Book in Colour had sold in excess of one million copies by 1969. She has since sold 17 million copies of her 170 books. Patten authored two vegetarian cookbooks, Meals Without Meat (1964) and Vegetarian Cooking for You (1979). Her most popular cookbooks included Classic Dishes Made Simple (1969) and Spam: The Cookbook (2000).

Patten continued to contribute to TV and radio food programmes into her late nineties, following a brief retirement in her seventies. Her approach to cookery instruction included teaching essential knowledge and skills needed in the kitchen. Her advice and books were instrumental in improving the quality of British cookery in the post-war years, when rationing meant that more exotic dishes were impossible to prepare. She has been an influence on other well-known cooks such as Gary Rhodes, who called her one of his two culinary heroes. Her 1972 part-work 'Perfect Cooking' was made into an art installation, a paper-weave, by British artist Martin Slidel, and exhibited at The Paper Factory, London (UK), in 2006.

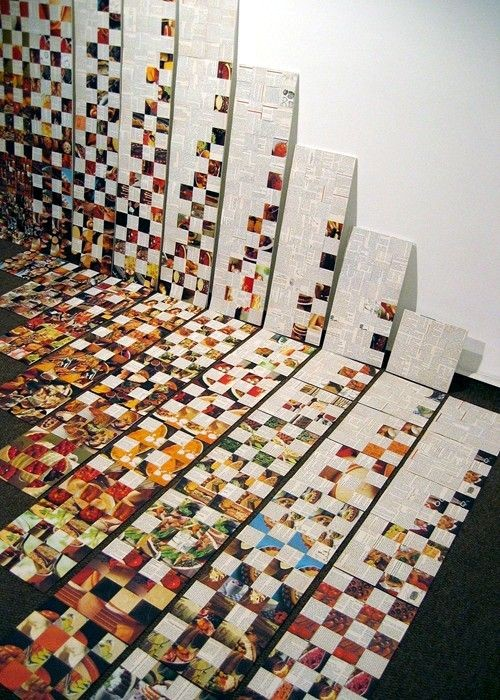
'Balanced Menus for Beauty Using the Mixer' art installation by British artist Martin Slidel, a paper-weave of Marguerite Patten's 1972 part-work.

== Honours ==
She was appointed Officer of the Order of the British Empire (OBE) in the 1991 Birthday Honours for "services to the Art of Cookery" and Commander of the Order of the British Empire (CBE) in the 2010 Birthday Honours. In 2007, she received the Woman of the Year Lifetime Achievement Award. She was the subject of This Is Your Life in 2000 when she was surprised by Michael Aspel during the Food Show at Birmingham's NEC.

== Death ==
Patten's death was announced on 10 June 2015. She died on Thursday 4 June aged 99, "from an illness stoically borne" according to her family. She had suffered a stroke in June 2011 which had robbed her of speech, and towards the end of her life, she could no longer stand, thus preventing her from cooking.
