= Fiona Beckett =

British writer, journalist

Fiona Beckett (born 1948) is a Bristol-based writer and food journalist who regularly writes for The Guardian, Decanter, and other UK news publications. She has also written for The Times, the Daily Mail, The Telegraph, and National Geographic Food. She is a regular judge for competitions such as the BBC Food and Farming Awards, the Andre Simon Awards, and the Fortnum & Mason Awards.

Beckett has written 23 books about food and wine, including How to Match Food and Wine, Cooking with Wine, and Wine by Style. She has been a contributing editor at Decanter since 1998 and was a wine columnist for The Guardian from 2010 to 2024.

Beckett has four children, including Will Beckett, co-founder of the Hawksmoor restaurant chain. She has a BA in Philosophy & Politics from University of Exeter.

== Selected works ==
- Eating and Drinking: an A-Z of Great Food & Drink Combinations (2000)
- How to Match Food and Wine (2002)
- Beyond Baked Beans, Absolute Press (2003)
- Beyond Baked Beans Green, Absolute Press (2004)
- Sausage and Mash, Absolute Press (2004)
- Cooking with Wine (2005)
- Beyond Baked Beans Budget, Absolute Press (2006)
- Meat and Two Veg, Absolute Press (2006)
- An Appetite for Ale, CAMRA Books (2007)
- The Frugal Cook (2008)
- Fiona Beckett's Cheese Course, Ryland Peters & Small Ltd (2009)
- The Ultimate Student Cookbook, Absolute Press (2009)
- The Frugal Cook, Absolute Press (2011)
- The Healthy Lunchbox, Grub Street (2014)
- Winelover's Kitchen: Delicious Recipes for Cooking with Wine, Ryland Peters & Small Ltd (2017)
- How to Drink without Drinking, Kyle (2019)

== Awards ==
- Food Journalist of the Year Award (2002), The Guild of Food Writers, for work in The Times, Decanter, Sainsbury's The Magazine
- Blogger of the Year (2014), International Wine and Spirit Competition
- Bookseller/Diagram Prize for Oddest Title of the Year (Shortlisted, 2019) for How to Drink without Drinking
