= Lugbara cuisine =

Culinary traditions of the Lugbara people

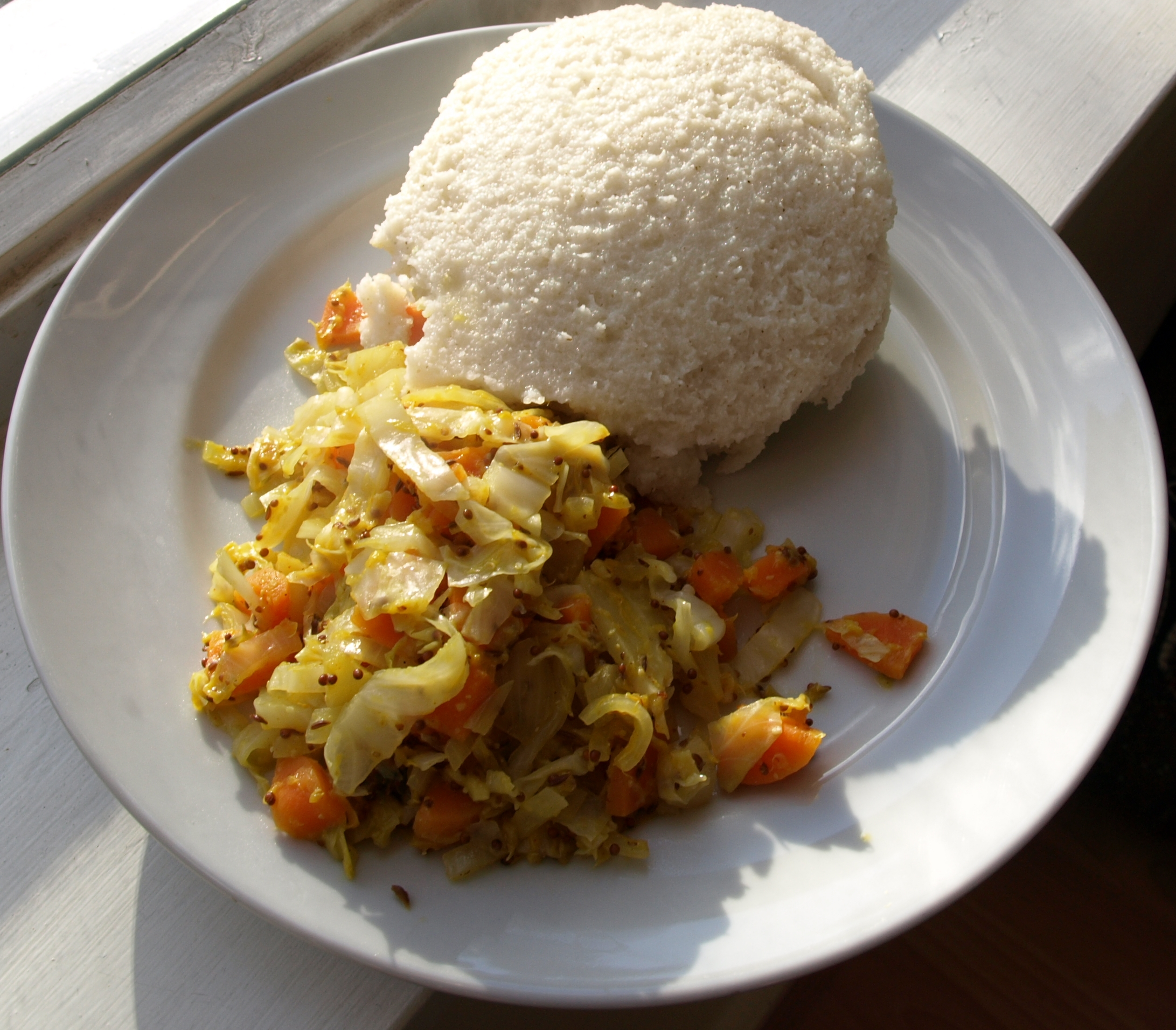
Posho and kebeji

Lugbara cuisine is one of the cuisines of East Africa and the ancient Lado Enclave. The Lugbara people of northwestern Uganda and northeastern DR Congo eat not only vegetable dishes, but also animals like goats, cows, and ope (guinea fowl) and catch insects like onya (white ants/winged termites) for food which is called nyaka in the standard Lugbara language used in Arua. Cassava flour, sometimes mixed with millet or sorghum like posho or ugali, is the staple food and is called enya(sa) (kalo or atap(a) in Ateso, fufu in West Africa) and accompanied with a range of soup dishes. Rice, yams, potatoes (including boiling plus mashing dried mutere) and matoke (steamed or mashed bananas) are also eaten. Below is a list of some of the Lugbara-styled foods found in West Nile restaurants, Ariwara Town (DR Congo), Arua Park in Kampala (Uganda's capital) and many homes and cafeterias that serve traditional Lugbara cuisine.

== Beverages ==
These include anya i'di (millet porridge sometimes mixed with groundnut – ala or simsim paste – anyu); lesu (milk) and maaku i'di (potato porridge, either fresh or dried but mashed) plus fruit juices like maize milk: Young (raw) maize is pounded, the juice squeezed out of it and boiled for drinking. It's not eaten whole like the Indians do; and mengu i'di – mango juice is prepared by cooking the mango, then as it is cooling, the juice is squeezed and mixed with sugar.

Ebe'de/ Ibe'de is tea without sugar. The name was coined after the act of scooping tea from a saucepan or large container during a function, it could also mean "self service" since everyone is expected to scoop for themselves. Kuruku chai (Lemon grass) is also washed and boiled in tea.

Kwete or kpete is the name for Lugbara beer. Sorghum fermented by aku fi (yeast) is used to brew it. Drunk after eating, it eases digestion and keeps the stomach in good condition.

Okalitua is a very sour colourless alcohol brewed from cassava, mainly by women and drunk by men sat in the sun after one drink of Camia.

== Dishes and soups ==
Alanda/amboroko

The Lugbara antcake is made from small white ants and is like ombangulu. The trapping of ants is usually done during daytime (morning or evening). A flat grassless mass of soil, hard like an anthill, is called amboroko. A hole is dug, then mud mixed and a dome is then placed on top of the hole. The insects from underground gather in the raised mud while a song is sung, "Kuru, kuru, kuru!" plus drum beaten. An opening is created in the mud to let the insects out and the drummer sings, "Bha ki ilulua ilu, ma ilu ku!" [Translation: "People are creating an opening, am not!"]. When these insects are scooped within the mud, they are pounded soft with wings still on. Some people put them in leaves and boil, and then dry them until they harden. Otunyo (Yesterday's white ants) are pressed into an otaku pot. When it ferments/ smells after two days, it is pressed with a ladle. Then, leaves are put on it in the pot. It can be added to food like agobi (fresh pumpkin leaves chopped and prepared). It is not put in beans or meat. Akuruma is collected in the mornings and there is always a lot of noise made from empty tins, jerrycans, jingles, etc. Ifu/ Ofu is gathered in the late afternoon (3–4pm) with children singing. Ica is the last type usually gathered before dusk (6–7pm).

Anyoya

Boiled dry maize and beans sumptuous for breakfast is called anyoy(i)a in the Alur language of Nebbi and means "fermented"; also called empengere in Luganda. Anyoya is prepared at night for consumption in the morning. It is the staple food for Japadhola in Eastern Uganda who are ethnically linked to the Alur of West Nile and Luo of Kenya. In Arua Town, some love to call it "mix" and can include onions fried separately in oil. Angarawa or angaraba [in Terego dialect] refers to skinless beans, slightly fried or cooked, and mixed with g-nut paste. The Kikuyu in Kenya call it githeri and a story is told of one very traditional elder who was invited for a function and after examining the other dishes all round in the buffet, he was glad to find githeri and filled his plate.

Aria (birds)

Besides chicken, guineafowls, ducks (mbata) and turkeys (kulu kulu), the Lugbara keep some and hunt other birds of the sky, for example pigeons (amamu), weaverbirds plus sparrows using a Y-shaped sling locally called abudira or abidira. This tradition even inspired a Luganda song entitled "Akanyonyi Akalugwara" (A Lugbara Bird). In a household setting, the father gives the gizzard to his eldest child or any other he chooses.

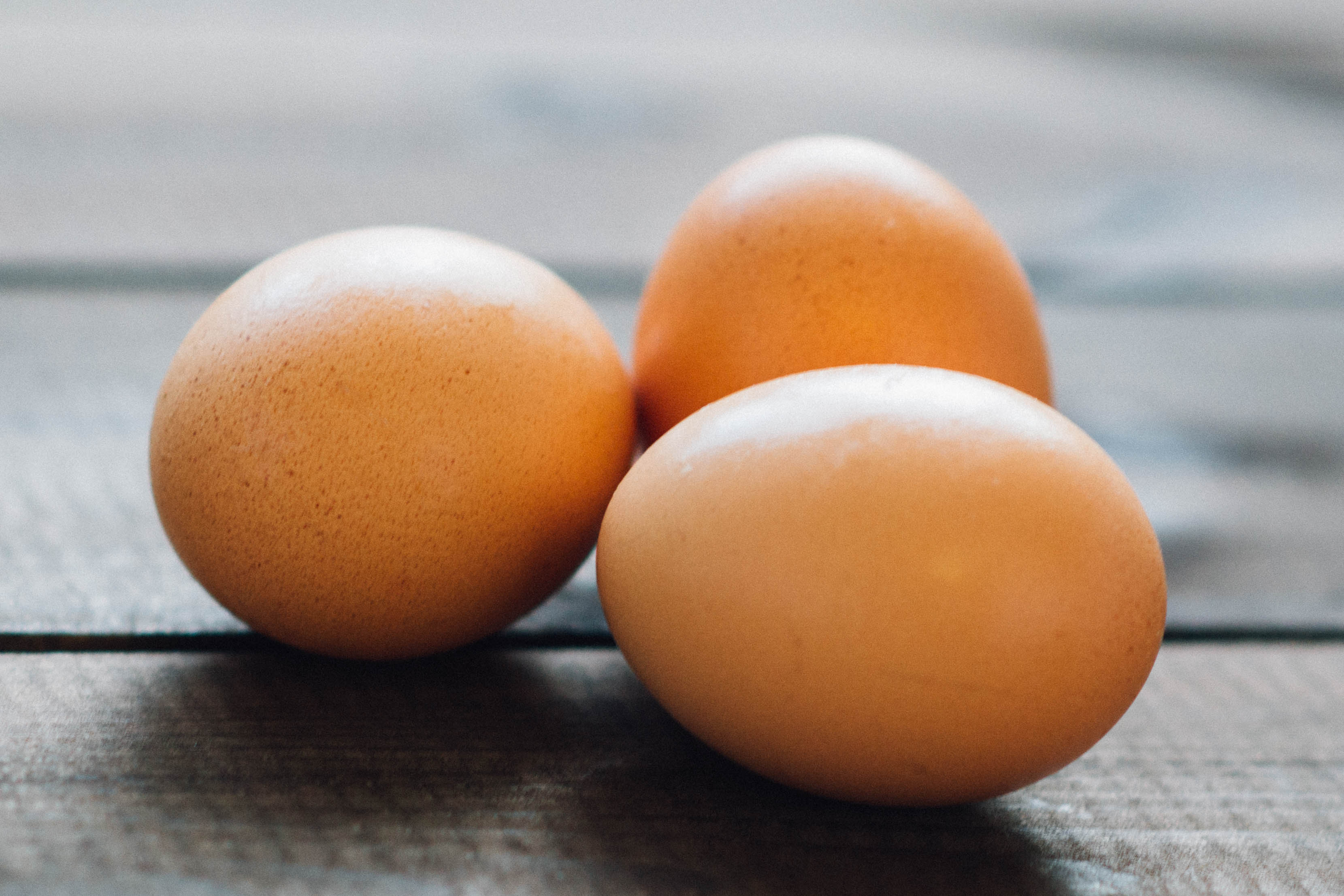
Au gbe (chicken eggs)

Au gbe (chicken eggs)

Eggs are boiled or fried and added to a different sauce if not prepared in groundnut paste or onions and tomatoes as sauce.

Banda bi (cassava leaves)

Called pandu in DR Congo, this dish can be mixed with i'bi (fish – preferably dry), ngenjia (small silver fish) or eza (minced meat).

Drika (mushrooms)

Maru are big white mushrooms that grow near anthills. Other mushrooms may grow where cooked cereals are dumped.

E'bi or i'bi (fish)

Angara, ngenjia and tilapia are the most common type of fish eaten by the Lugbara in West Nile. Nzikinziki is a Madi dish made from fish whose bones have been removed, mashed and cooked in groundnut paste. It is especially well-known in Adjumani.

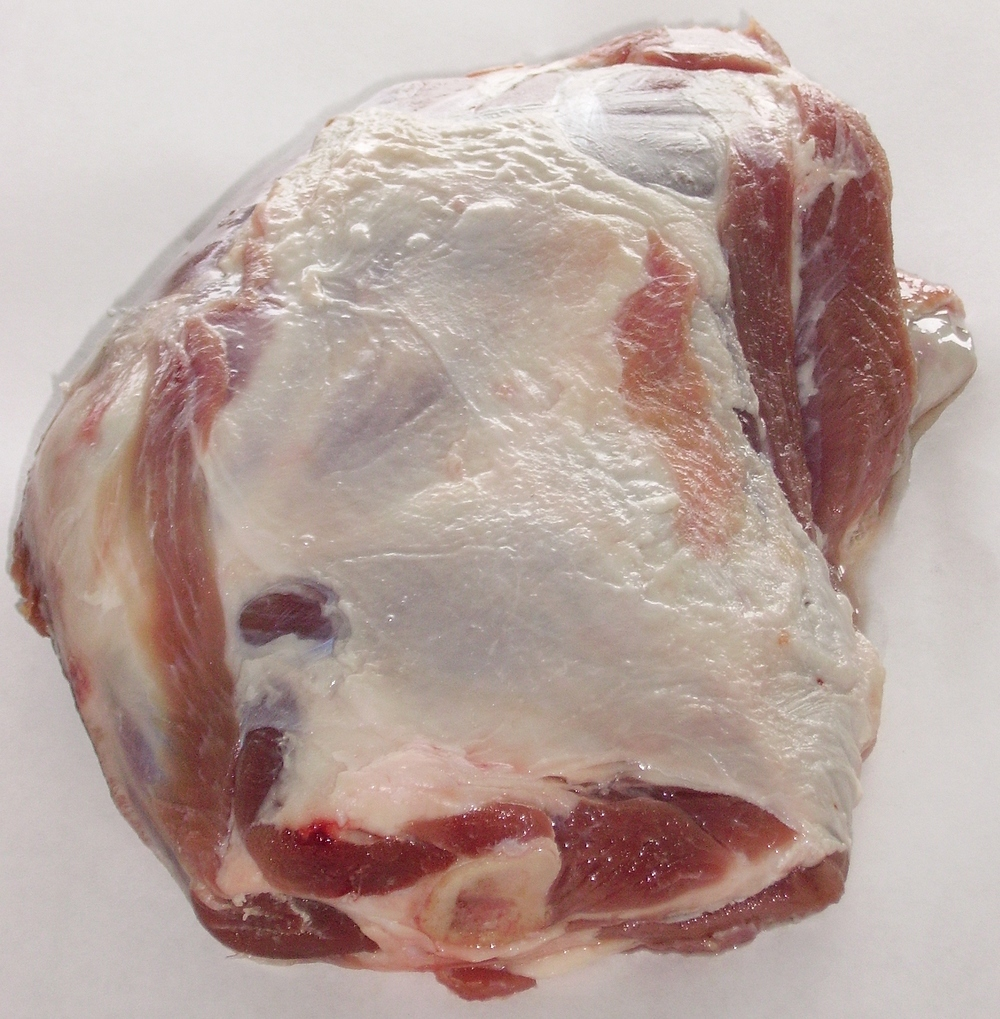
Kabilo eza (mutton)

Eza (meat)

Animal parts which are soft—for instance, liver and hump—are given to the elderly. They have reached a stage where they cannot eat hard things but they should be kept comfortable. Experienced and skilful youth weigh pieces of goat meat or mutton with both hands until they are equal and start distributing during slaughter. Putuku (also called mulokoni) is the leg of a cow. In Vurra – the Orchard of West Nile, au (chicken) combined with ago (pumpkin) is a special. Others enjoy ope (guineafowl) which the Lugbara used to rear most in Uganda. Indian curry can also be added to spice it up. Pork is a very Wanted Meat in the modern times, and can attract huge numbers to a village sale. Lugbaras now rare pigs more than they did before. In Terego, edible rats called omba omba hide in underground holes and are hunted for food. Line-dissected all through the lower middle, intestines are removed and rat dried, then cooked. Rabbits and game meat are also eaten.

Fi (offal)

Fi is a dish of intestines, colloquially referred to as baka (rope) and named ebyenda by the Bantu.

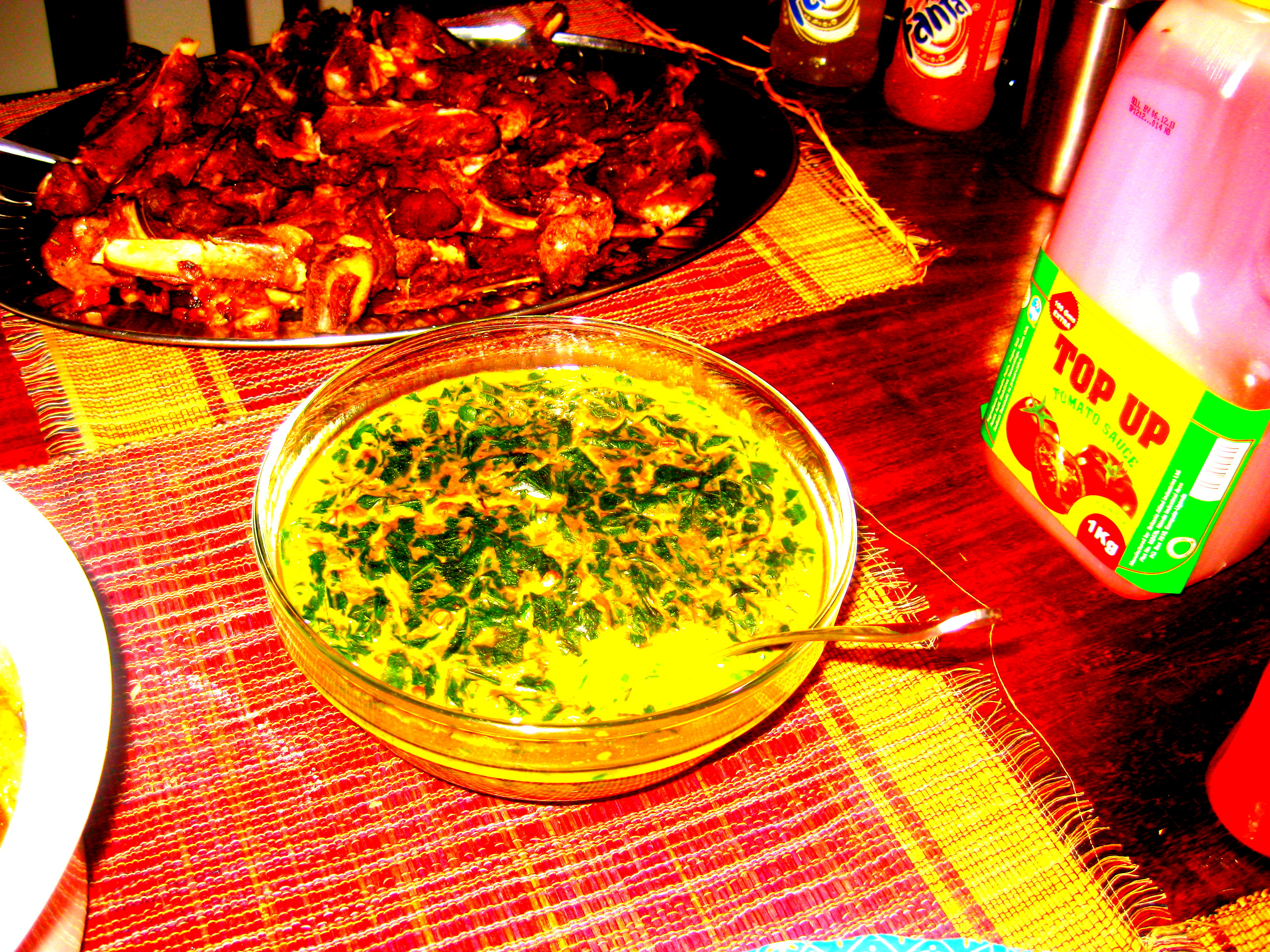
Osubi (bean leaves)

Iribi (vegetables/greens)

Examples include osubi (bean leaves, also called gobe), murabi – type of mundrokolo or mundrokole, agobi (pumpkin leaves), ijiribi, itobi, okaka bi, alukutubi (creeping greens), asuaka, malakwang – very popular in northern Uganda, biringanya (eggplant), nyanya (tomatoes), ntula (green berries), awubi, banda bi (cassava leaves), kili wiri, pala bi (jute leaves), jambala (beans and greens without g-nut paste), bamia (okra), murukulu (okra with g-nut stew), alutukubi, jupa, nakati, atrebi-okaka bi, orukwa (A certain kind of dodo greens), njarunjaru (greens and beans), osu nyirikia bi (leaves of tiny beans), French beans, sukuma wiki plus kebeji (cabbages). Waarla is mundrokole without beans.

Kelo

This dish is made from premature bananas, lamb, calf or other animal. Indians make something similar from premature maize.

Kila kila (sauce)

Beans with the skin on, kaiko burusu (peas), mundrokole added, ala (g-nut paste); Osu olungulungu [beans not crushed]; Angunduru is a kind of sauce prepared from beans.

Operete (ajira)

These are beans with the skin removed (kaiko is the Terego dialect for beans), mixed with or without ala (groundnut paste) or mundrokole (type of leaf vegetable collectively called "greens").

O'bokoa

The skin of a certain round fruit – usually yellow is dried, cooked and eaten as sauce. Some claim it tastes like meat. O'boko means cover or shell in Lugbara.

Oca oca

Also known as ocakuca (pronounced ochakucha), it is a kind of sauce prepared with peas and paste.

Ombangulu

Onya/ona/una (white ants) from otoko/otoo (anthill) are trapped at night after rain falls during the periodic ant migration season. An oil lamp (tala) or other light source like (g)alaka (dry grass) which is lit, is used to draw them to a hole dug near their anthill. In Maracha, nde nde (palm tree leaves) are used to cover the hole where the edible termites have fallen. After collecting in a container, they are steamed and put to dry. Sieving of captured insects is done to remove 'biko (insect wings) and taken to the market. For the remaining ants at home, oni (stones) are picked out and ants cooked with ai (salt) before being eaten straight away or dried in the sun for future consumption. Ombangulu (casually regarded as "Lugbara pizza") is made by pounding wingless onya, adding salt and cooking in leaves (like from banana plants). It can also be called bofolo; ombangulu literally means "toughened or compacted together". There are three kinds of white ants harvested at night: ondreondre/ andre are harvested immediately after dusk (7:30–8:30pm). The gatherers go home for supper which can include quickly fried white ants. From 11pm to midnight, they go for the second round harvest but on a different mound. This harvest is called api/ inia because it is collected in the middle of the night. The last harvest is in the early morning hours (4:30–6:00am) and is called egbere from which obangulu is made.

== Seasoning and appetisers ==
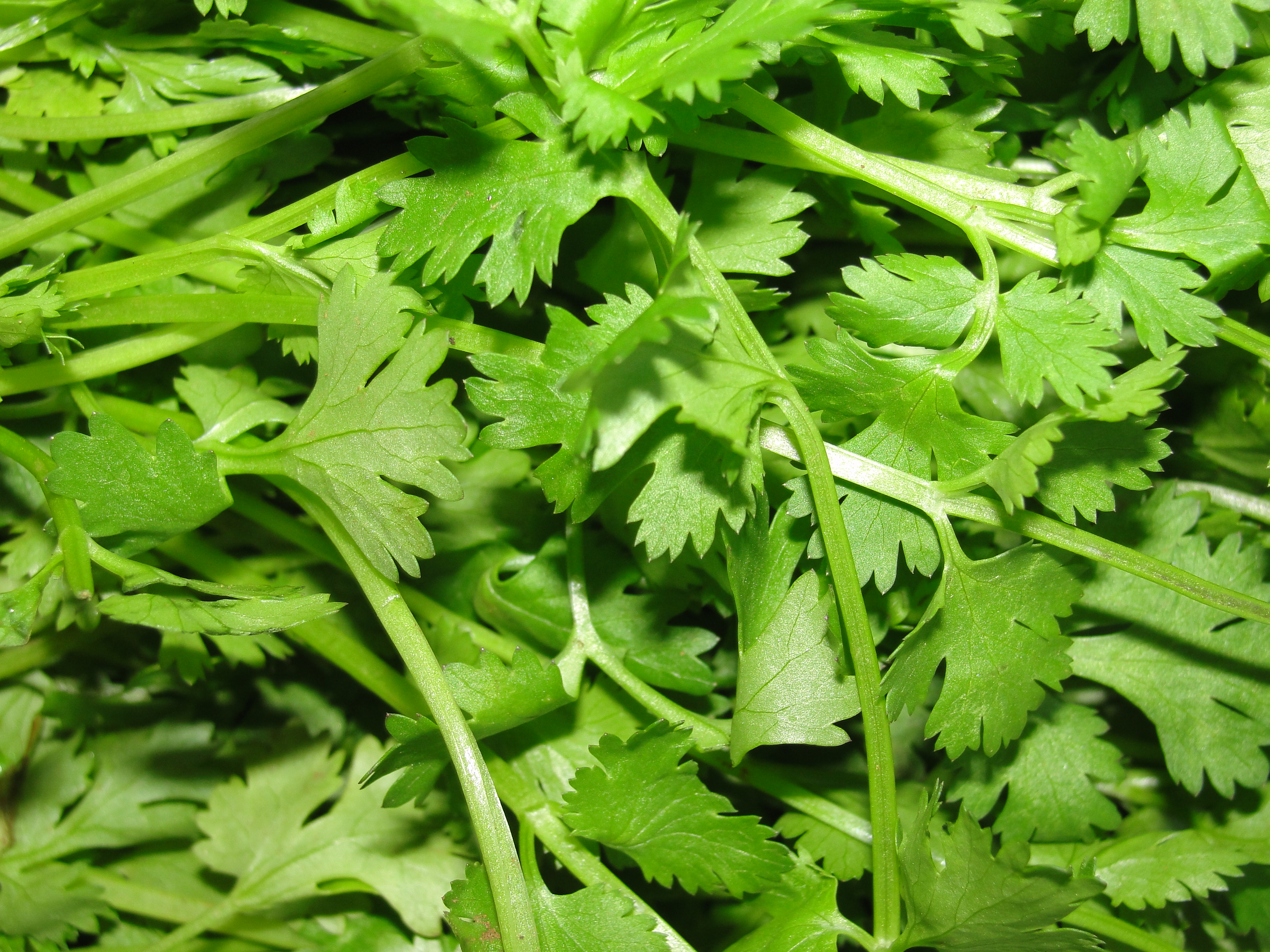
Dania (coriander leaves)

Dania

Coriander is called dania in Lugbara and the small leaves are cooked with food to add flavour. Another method is to chop them smaller and add raw when food is ready.

Ofuta

Also called ofutaku, it is an ingredient produced by burning dried bean pods, banana peelings, etc. and mixing the ash with water before sieving to produce a brown liquid used to cook greens like osubi. It maintains their green chlorophyll colour. Aitipa (sometimes spelt a'itipa) is got from particular plants. Women can spend a whole day collecting various salty leaves even from the valley. Then the leaves are left to wiver in the sun for some time before being burnt while they are dry. Magadi can be used in place of salt and is got from water like at Kibiro on the Northern shores of Lake Albert; it probably got its name from the salty Lake Magadi in Tanzania.

Pili pili

Garlic, red or green pepper and chillies like muni are also added to spice food.

Styles

There are two main cooking techniques used in preparing greens: boiling and frying. The latter lusciously maintains the juicy taste in the leaves. Wash the greens, like nakati in a small kitchen basin or saucepan, pour out the dirty water and fry the greens for a short time in oil that is flavoured with onions and green pepper (plus tomatoes, carrots and boiled eggs). Do not add more water by the way, it may ruin the freshness! Also, add salt only after the greens have shrunk.

As for the first method, even if the sharp juicy taste is taken away by boiling, the Lugbara always find a mouthwatering way to sweeten their food. Ofutaku, magadi or a'itipa can be added early to maintain the green colour of the leaves. Meanwhile, there are also sweeteners, for example avocado, kamura odu (edible oil from the bark of a certain tree) and sesame oil added at the table. Black Harmony (Arua), a Lugbara music duo sing about ala/ anyu (groundnut/ simsim paste, also known as odii by the Acholi) in their song "Adia". The singing voice tells his woman named "Adia" to prepare for him "mutere" (Sliced and sun-dried cassava or potatoes) plus a side dish of either atra bi, awu bi, pala bi, agobi or dodo and sweeten it with a little ala and ai (salt).

Sometimes, chicken is marinated in eggs before frying.

== Snacks ==
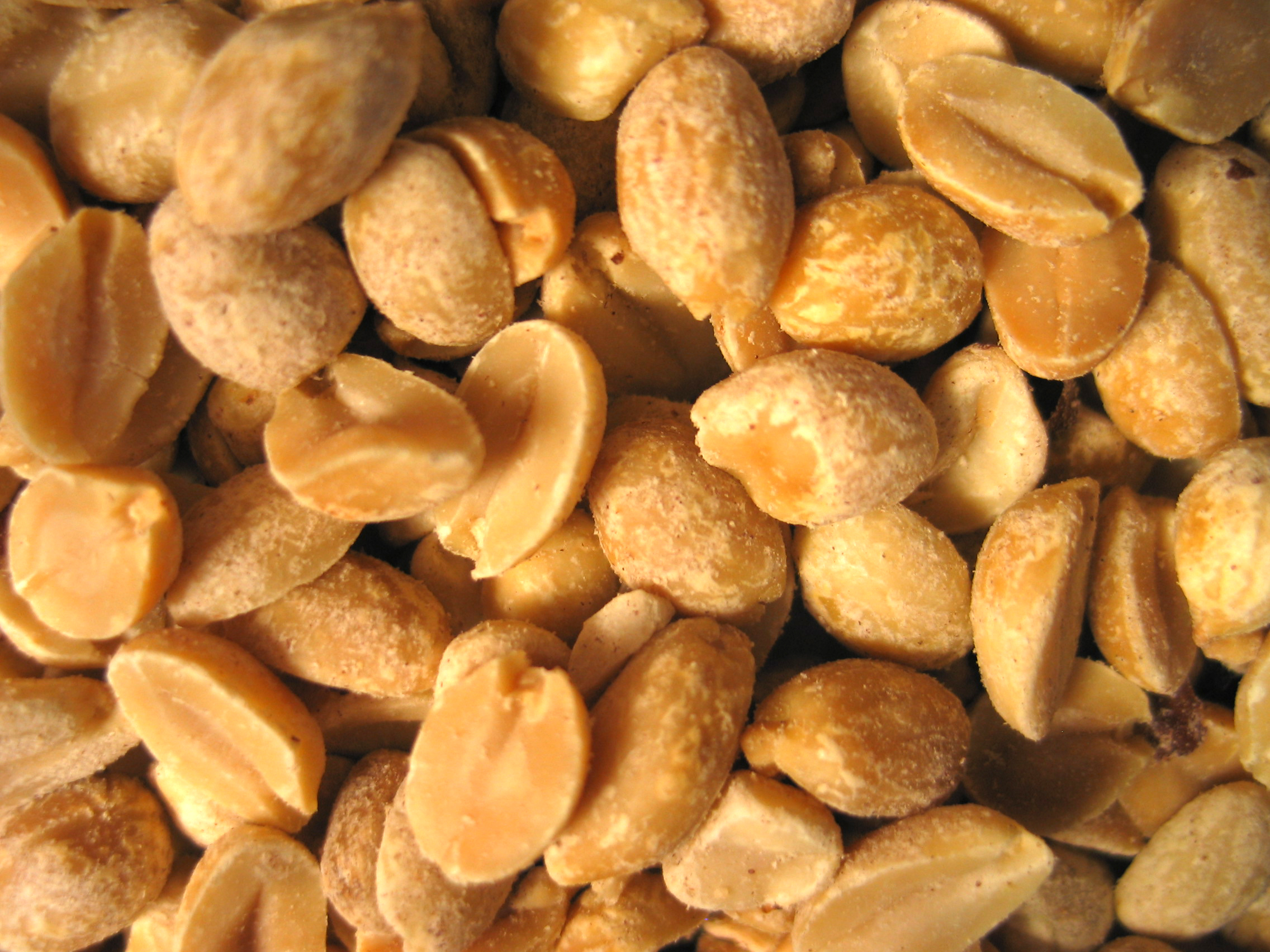
Funyo (groundnuts)

Akarafi

These include groundnuts, soya seeds, jackfruit seeds and pumpkin seeds. They are roasted and consumed at tea time.

Ese/ise

Grasshoppers that migrate seasonally around April and November every year. Ombi (locusts) can be very destructive in the areas near South Sudan and though some are poisonous and forbidden, frying and eating the other types is a method of pest control.

Likinya

Brown-skinned on the outside but soft white inside, this hanging tuber grows as a climbing plant on other trees and tastes like yam.

Lumboo

This is an underground tuber that grows long but is now extinct. When it is skinned, it becomes white and very sweet. A very rare tuber, it used to be eaten a long time ago. Other food crops like sweet potatoes took over and so lumboo was abandoned.

Maracha bread (mukati)

A snack made entirely from maize, it can be eaten during teatime. Maize grains are ground on a flat stone or in a mortar before being tied in a leaf like for a banana plant and boiled, something similar to luwombo (among the Baganda) but this time instead of chicken, pounded maize is boiled to form a block or oval shape. When ready, the mass is removed and eaten, with tea or coffee. There is a Lugbara proverb that says: Kaka ni ka 'ba sikokori ni indi (Maize ripens for people without teeth also). Besides posho, anyoya, kelo and roasting, this is another local way to prepare maize, for instance in Ojapi Parish.

Mutere

When sweet potatoes or cassava are cut into smaller pieces, then dried in the sun for a number of days and later boiled or prepared otherwise, it preserves their sweetness. Itesots call it amukeke.

Onya

Fried white ants are also eaten as snacks just like grasshoppers and select locusts.

Ozi

These are formica wood ants that can be found near anthill mounds. When cooked, they have a crunchy taste.

Traditional Lugbara mealtime includes:

- O'biti (Morning): 7–8AM
- Anya i'di: 10–11AM
- Nyaka itua: 12–2PM
- Asileri ibe'de: 8–9PM

== See also ==
- Orientale Province
