= Mount Wati =

Mountain in Uganda

Coordinates: 3°12′53″N 31°01′53″E

Mount Wati is one of the highest mountains in West Nile. It is located in Terego District in two sub counties of Ayivu and Omugo in parishes of Anyifura and Erea. The nearest town and city are Leju town council and Arua City, and the nearest densely populated centers are Kubala and Wafa in Omugo and Ayivu sub counties respectively, near the border with Maracha. The mountain was gazette as a forest reserve in 1948 and it was to be managed as a communal forest reserve, but there is no clear management responsibility of the mountain and no clear tariffs. The peak of Mount Wati also known as Eti or Iti is referred to as Ortega Peak. The ranges next to it include Offude Hills near Tara Subcounty. Rebels used to hide on Mt. Wati and monitor advancing government soldiers. It is also reported to harbour big snakes that use lights for trapping prey at night. The elevation is approximately 1250 meters above sea level. Mt. Wati is a tourism gem in West Nile. At the foothills is Olewa Falls on River Enyau. It can take 4 hours round the mountain for the slowest climber.

== Mythology surrounding Wati ==
Dribidu, the ancestor of all Lugbara people is believed, according to myths, to have settled there after being excommunicated from east of the Albert Nile. He saw smoke rising from near the mountain and on approaching the source found a woman cooking. He made her his wife, hence the Lugbara tribe started from Wati. Proverbs have also been created using Wati as a subject for describing wise ideas. Legend also tells of a small hill called Ojuqua that used to be in Madi, Uganda. Then one day, a huge flock of birds started to roost on the hill. These birds would spend the days consuming people's crops and then return to Ojuqua Hill to sleep at night. The people began to hate and curse the hill for bringing these birds to the land and destroying their crops. So one night, a rumbling was heard and the people of Madi awoke to find that Ojuqua was no longer there. The hill had moved to Terego during the night because it was afraid of the people who hated it. Ojuqua asked Mount Wati if he could stay in this land and Wati permitted it. So now the hill of Ojuqua stands under the protection of the shadow of Mount Wati.

== Mt. Wati in films ==
Across Mt. Wati

Mt. Wati features in Across Mt. Wati, a 2024 drama film produced by Anthen Asiimwe, directed by Ronald Avas and starring Yusuf Opingopi Andabati as Patrick Edema, a local politician who impregnates a mad woman called Maturu (played by Hope Letasi). To cleanse himself, Edema seeks pardon from ancestors beyond the mountain. Emmanuel Ayikobua was the Production Manager while supporting cast included Hakim Aliku (as Edema's political opponent), Sandra Giramia, Asunta Sakaru, Hassan Anguyo, John Bosco Asibuku, Gloria Faida, Nusura Likoco and others.

== See also ==
- Arua
- Across Mt. Wati
