= Githeri =

Kenyan traditional meal

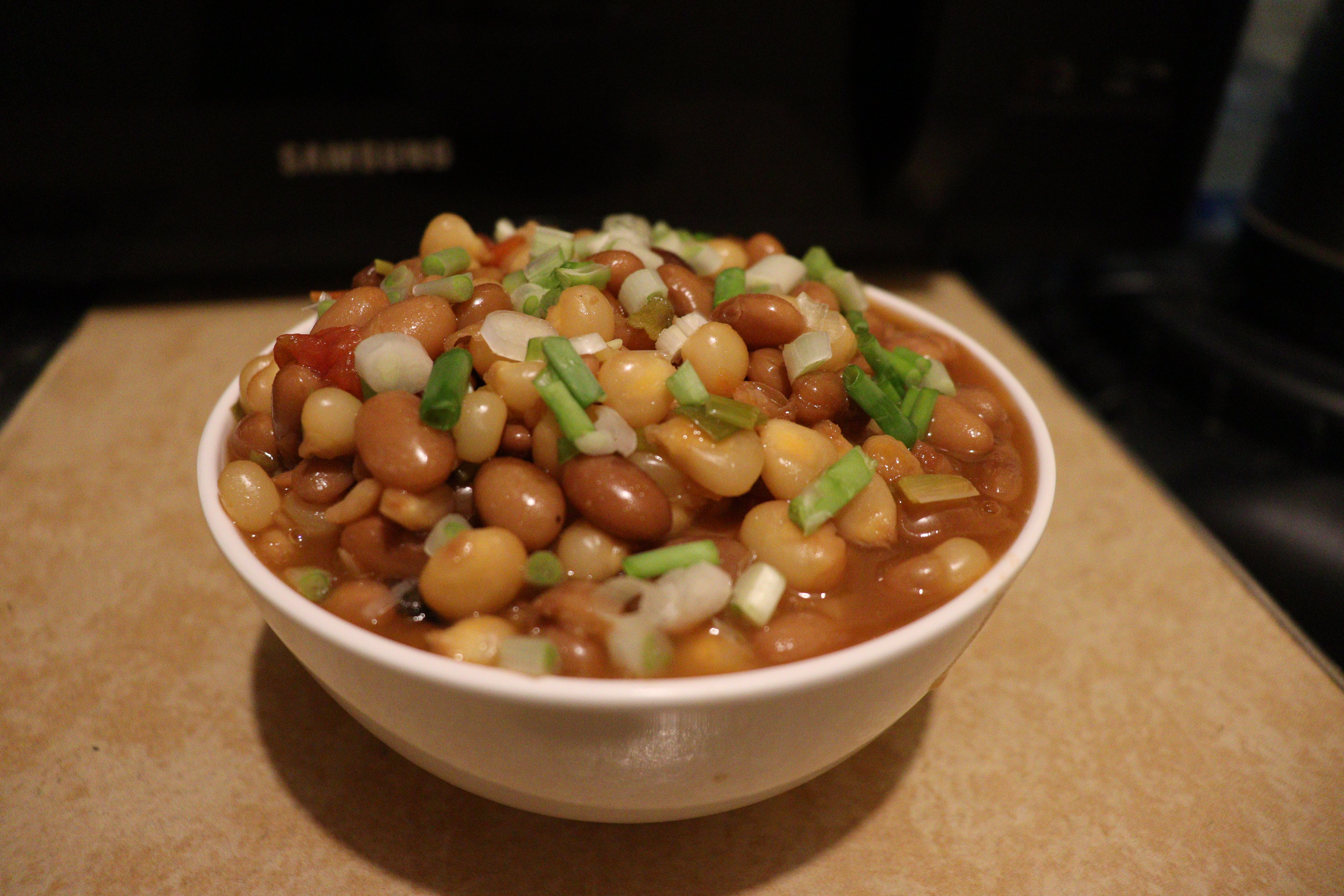
- Alternative names: Succotash, githere, murram, muthere or mutheri
- Course: Main course
- Place of origin: Kenya
- Region or state: Any region
- Serving temperature: Hot
- Main ingredients: Maize, red beans, black beans, maize, lima beans, butter, salt

Githeri (Gĩtheri), also called muthere or mutheri, mûthekia-ngûkû is a traditional Kenyan meal consisting of maize kernels and legumes (primarily beans) mixed and boiled together. The maize and beans are mixed in a sufuria, a type of pot, with water added, and the mixture is boiled until fully cooked.

It is the staple food of the Gikuyu, Meru, Embu people and Kamba people in the Central Province and Eastern Province of Kenya. It is also popular in other parts of the country, such as with the Kamba people of the Eastern Province, and communities in Western and Rift Valley parts of Kenya. The primary ingredients for this dish, maize and beans, are commonly found in local farms and homesteads.

The dish is widespread and is also a traditional dish from North Africa to South Africa. The base ingredients of githeri are used in many other meals from different regions.

Both fresh and dried beans and maize can be used for githeri. Githeri can also be made into a stew with the addition of vegetables, potatoes, and sometimes meat. It can also be used to make mukimo by adding potatoes, bananas and greens, and mashing up the mixture.

This popular dish has been the main meal served to students in Kenya since the 1920s. Eating githeri is now a trend among young people, and is even served in many hotels in Kenya. Lately, there has been a rise in the popularity of githeri due to the health benefits associated with this plant-based dish.

There was a spike in popularity in 2017 when a voter, Martin Kamotho, was spotted eating githeri while waiting to vote and was labelled as githeri man.

== Terms associated with githeri ==
=== Kikuyu language ===
- murugarugio – githeri put in a plate direct from the pot, with only salt added to it. Murugarugio comes from the Kikuyu meaning moving up and down. Once the salt is added the plate is shaken up and down.
- gikangu (pronounced gy-kah-ngoh) – cold githeri with more maize than beans. It was traditionally cooked in poor households and served to school-aged children.
- kagoto – ballast in English; this is a slang name for githeri used by secondary school students in Central Province.
- mbeu – seeds; the githeri is described as seeds because it contains whole maize and beans.
- mukimo – githeri mixed with potatoes, greens and bananas, then mashed together.
- mutheri – another name for githeri.
- muthungu – githeri made out of maize exclusively without beans. Muthungu means "the white man" which is a fitting name for a dish full of white seeds.
- kibecu – slang for githeri amongst young Kikuyus.

=== Embu language ===
- mbeu – seeds; the githeri is described as seeds because it contains whole maize and beans.
- mukimo – githeri mixed with potatoes, greens and bananas, then mashed together.
- muthokoi – githeri with corn whose testa (seedcoat) has been partially removed.

=== Kamba language ===
- isyo – general name for githeri.
- mukeu – githeri made of undried (fresh) corn and legumes (beans).
- muthakyo – githeri which has only been boiled and is served without any soup in it.
- muthokoi – githeri with corn whose testa (seedcoat) has been partially removed.

=== Luo Language ===
- nyoyo – general name for githeri in Luo.
- mahanya – shelled maize boiled and eaten without beans

=== Kalenjin languages ===
- kwankwaniek – general name for githeri; loosely "cooked, cooked food", from kwany (cook)

=== IsiZulu language ===
- Izinkobe - the general name for getheri in isiZulu. The maize can either be fresh or dry. When using dry maize, beans are added mid-cooking when the maize has softened.

=== Slang ===
- murrum murro – Swahili slang (Sheng) for githeri due to its similar appearance to murram roads; popular among high school students.

Taita language "Boboro" the general name for githeri in Taita from the Coast region.

== See also ==
- Succotash
- Ugali
- Chapati
