= Pagash =

Traditional Slavic Lenten dish

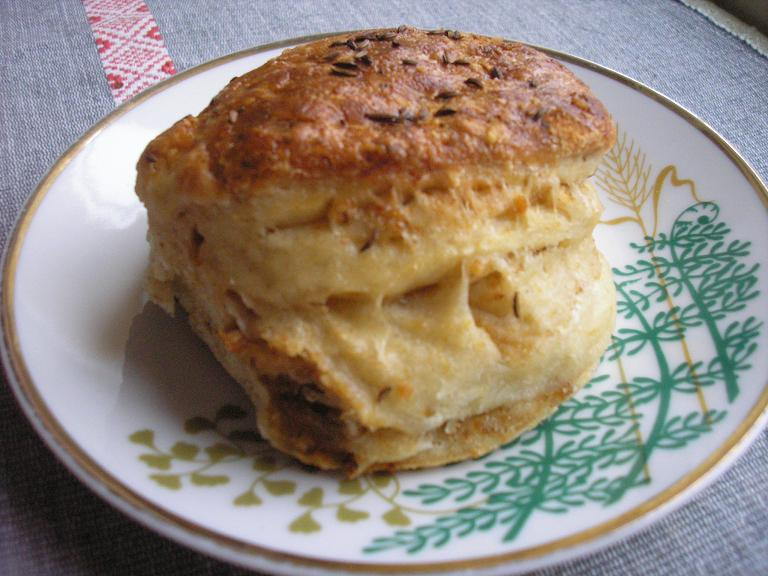
Slice of pagac

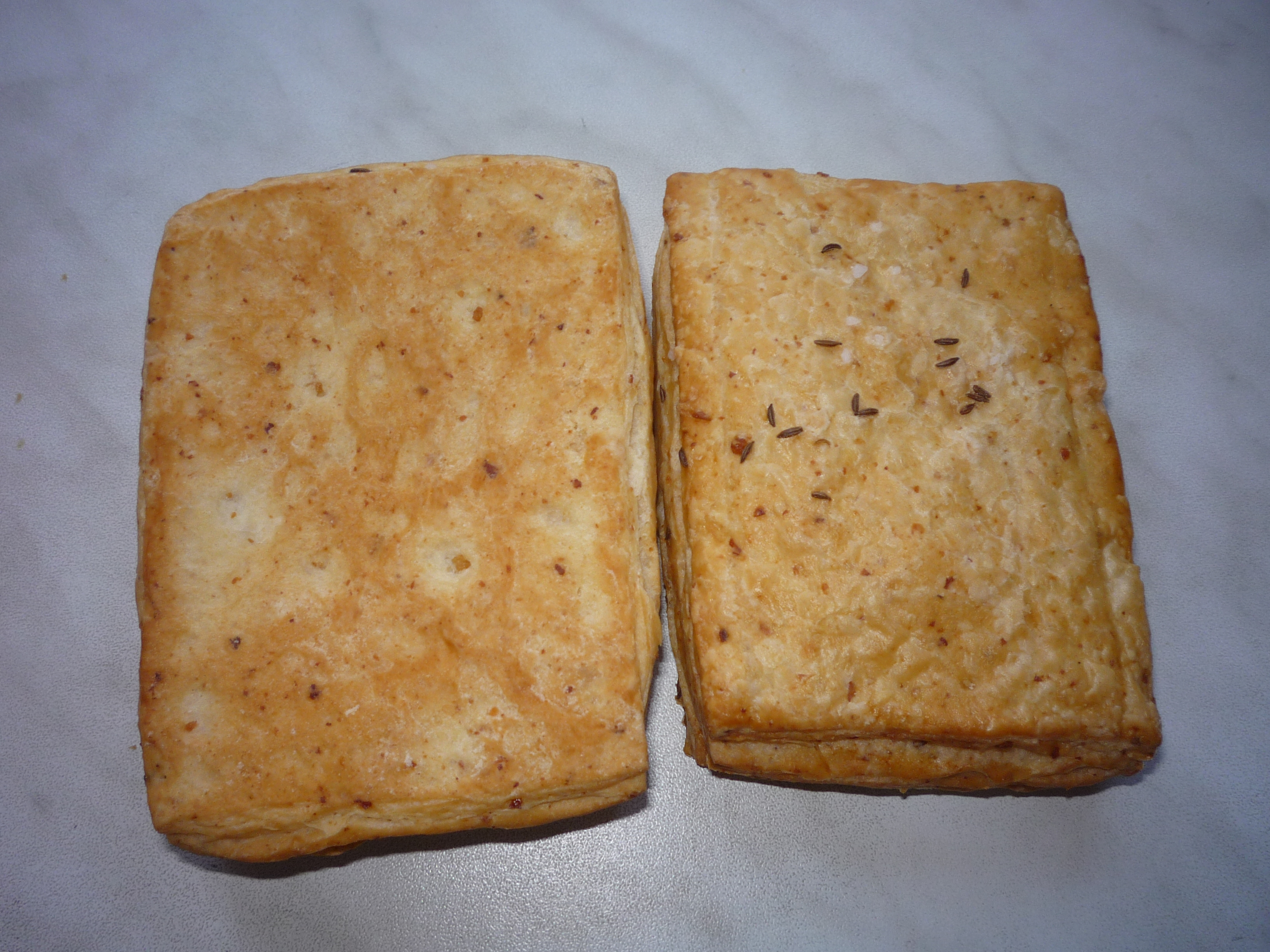
Two preparations of pagáč in the Czech Republic

Pagash, pagach, or pagac is a food made of mashed potatoes, dough, and cheese. It may also include cabbage in addition to the potatoes. It originated as a Lenten dish in Slavic regions. It is popular in Northeastern Pennsylvania and Southwestern Pennsylvania, which has been shaped by the large population of Catholic immigrants from those regions.

== Description ==
Pagash is a food made of mashed potatoes and dough. It has been referred to as "Slavic pizza" or "Polish pizza" (even if not part of Polish cousine). Pierogi pizza is a related dish made with similar ingredients.

== Origin ==
The food originated as a Lenten dish in Slavic regions. It is popular in Northeastern Pennsylvania and Southwestern Pennsylvania, which has been shaped by the large population of Catholic immigrants from those regions. It may be spelled pagash, pagach, or pagac.

== Recipe ==
A modern Pennsylvania pagash dish typically consists of mashed potatoes or sautéed cabbage baked between or on top of pizza crust. The potatoes or cabbage will often contain additives that may include butter, onions, cheese, and seasonings. Cheese may also be placed on top of the dish.

== See also ==
- Lent
- Pogača
- Pierogi
- Slavic culture
- Zapiekanka
