= Tara Subcounty =

Region in Maracha District, Uganda

Tara is a subcounty at the northern end of the Maracha District of Uganda, near the border with the Democratic Republic of the Congo. Tara Subcounty is part of the Northern Region of Uganda, within the West Nile sub-region. It contains six parishes: Anyviu, Offude, Pajama, Vurra, Wanguru, and Yiddu.

In 1991, a primary school in the sub-county was bombed by unknown air forces, resulting in at least two deaths.

== Origins ==
According to Lugbara oral tradition, a man called Ajua is the great-grandfather of Tara parishes. He wanted to see where Ono (River Enyau or Anyau - a tributary of River Nile also met by a river from Tara) ends, which would be its source. So he moved with his cows and found people dancing at a dog funeral in Onduparaka (a few kilometres north of Arua Town). He joined in the dance and was given a wife. She gave birth to Opodria who later birthed Naye, the father of the seven true parishes of Tara.

Ajua left Onduparaka on his quest and went to Ovisoni (West of Arua Town). There he also found people dancing and was allowed to join them. He was given another wife. Some say he paid bride price. The woman gave birth to Otu (Lugbara for Umbilical cord), the father of Vurra - after whom a county was named in Arua District. The actual source of the river is in Vurra, not far from the DR Congo border.

Otu is the step-brother of Opodria, the grandfather of the other Vur(r)a, a parish in Tara Subcounty which encompasses the villages from East /West Kololo (the Subcounty Headquarters), Pajuru to Odupiri. Vur(r)a's six brothers after whom parishes are named in Tara include Ojapi, Ajulepi, Yidu (Pajama Area), Oliapi (Oliyepi), Aruwe and Rendu.

== Tara Hills and Rocks ==
Tara is an area endowed with rocks and is neighboured in the Northwest by Koboko; to the Northeast by Yumbe; to the East by Omugo subcounty plus to the South by Nyadri (Maracha Town). Other subcounties in Maracha include Yivu, Aiivu, Oleba, Uriama, Omugo and Nyadri.

Two of the highest mountains in the whole of West Nile can be seen while in Tara, that is Mt. Wati (in Terego County) and Mt. Liru on the Koboko side of Lurujo Road. You can get a customized view when you sit on top of the wide rock in Tara named Komendaku (translated as You don't need to search for a chair!). Adventurers and tourists write their names on the rocks and take small ones as souvenirs plus for research purposes. Red monkeys, rock badgers, porcupines and other interesting animals can be found near some of these rocks.

When you stand at the soccer field of Ojapi Primary School, the ranges anticlockwise from Mt. Liru include Kodro, Gala, Kadri, Adrofiya and Njeke (or Njakai). On the south side of Ojapi as you move from Oliapi Primary School to Orani (which also has a rock named after the place), you will see Adada and Luturujo (which translates as The House of/ on a Hill).

Despite all these rocks, the farmlands are very productive and agriculture is the predominant economic activity. Crops grown include maize, cassava, ground nut, soya, coffee and beans. Tobacco locally regarded as Assets is grown as a major cash crop. Animals are also reared including cows, goats, sheep, guineafowls, chicken plus pigs. On market days like at Mabira, Ajira, Gili Gili and Odupiri, people sell foodstuffs and other household items as the sun sets. The grasshopper is a staple food and Emblem for Maracha, a Lugbara clan.

== See also ==
- Lugbara people
- Lugbara mythology
- Maracha District
