= Mashed potato =

Potato dish

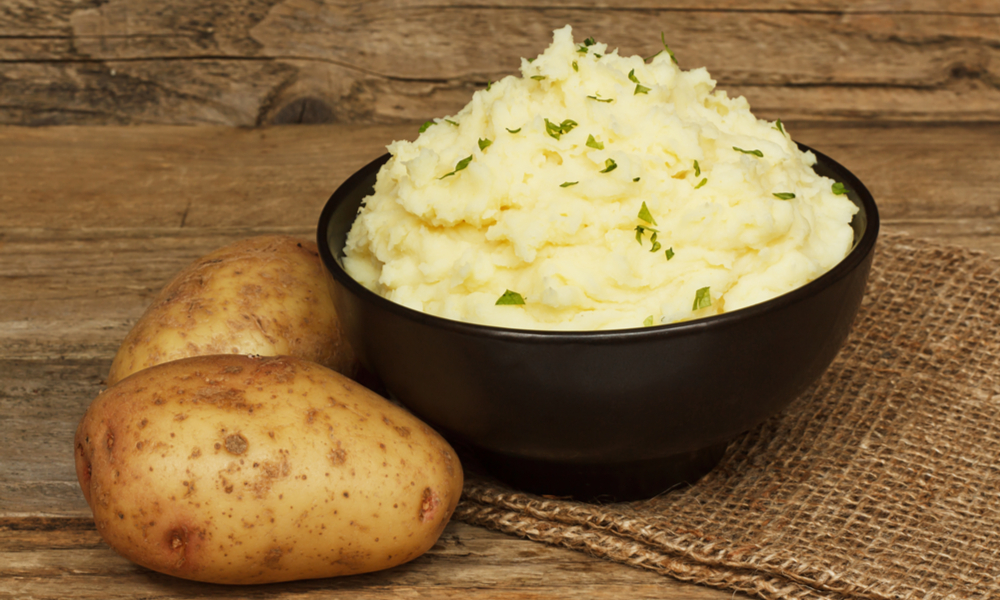
- Course: Side dish, condiment
- Place of origin: United Kingdom
- Main ingredients: Potatoes, butter, milk or cream, salt, black pepper
- Variations: Duchess potatoes

Mashed potato or mashed potatoes (American, Canadian, and Australian English), colloquially known as mash (British English), is a dish made by mashing boiled or steamed potatoes, usually with added milk, butter, salt, and pepper. It is generally served as a side dish to meat or vegetables. Roughly mashed potatoes are sometimes called smashed potatoes. Dehydrated instant mashed potatoes and frozen mashed potatoes are available. Mashed potatoes are an ingredient in other dishes, such as dumplings and gnocchi.

== History ==
An early recipe is found in Hannah Glasse's The Art of Cookery, published in 1747. Her recipe mashed them in a saucepan with milk, salt, and butter.

== Ingredients ==
Most authors recommend the use of "floury" potatoes with a high ratio of amylose in their starch to achieve a fluffy, creamy consistency and appearance. The best-known floury varieties are King Edward, Golden Wonder, and Red Rascal in Britain and the Russet in North America. However, some recipes use "waxy" potatoes containing more amylopectin in their starch for a different texture or look; for instance, one pounded mashed potato dish from Yunnan cuisine (in southwestern China), uses waxy potatoes to achieve a chewy, sticky texture.

Butter, milk or cream, salt, and pepper are usually added. Many other seasonings may also be used, including herbs (notably parsley and chives), spices (notably nutmeg), garlic, cheese, bacon, sour cream, crisp onion or spring onion, caramelized onion, and mustard.

One French variation adds egg yolk for pommes duchesse, or Duchess potatoes, piped through a pastry tube into wavy ribbons and rosettes, brushed with butter, and lightly browned. Some French recipes for pomme purée (potato puree) use up to one part butter for every two parts potato. In low-calorie or non-dairy variations, milk, cream, and butter may be replaced by soup stock or broth.

Aloo bharta, an Indian sub-continent variation, uses chopped onions, mustard (oil, paste, or seeds), chili pepper, coriander leaves, and other spices. Alu pitika (Assamese: আলু পিটিকা) is a popular variation of aloo bharta in Assam, that may occasionally omit mustard and other spices. Alu pitika, made with roasted and smoked potatoes, is especially consumed in the winter.

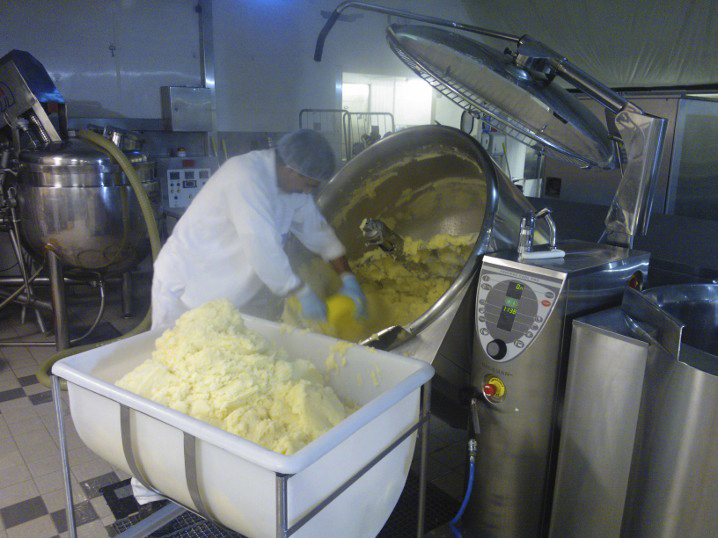
Industrial cooking of mashed potatoes in a steam-jacketed combi kettle

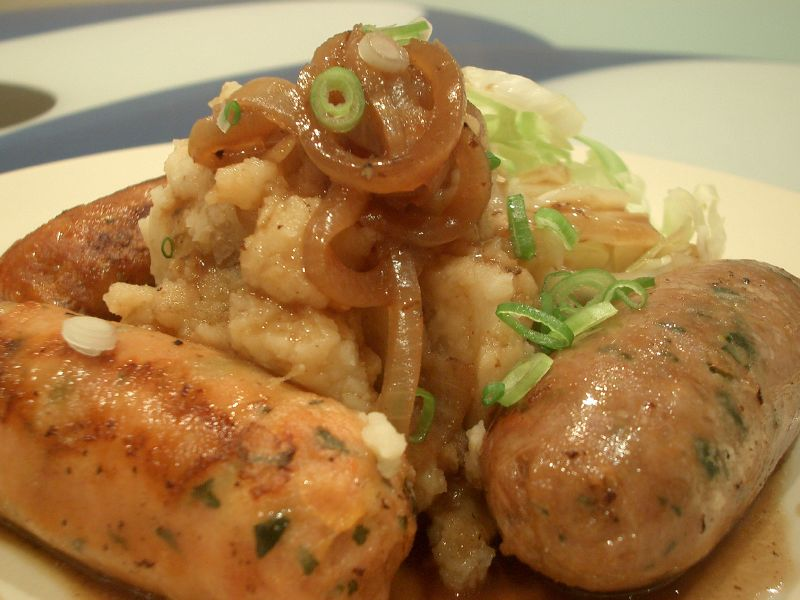
A plate of sausage and mashed potatoes, with cabbage and onion gravy, commonly known as "bangers and mash"

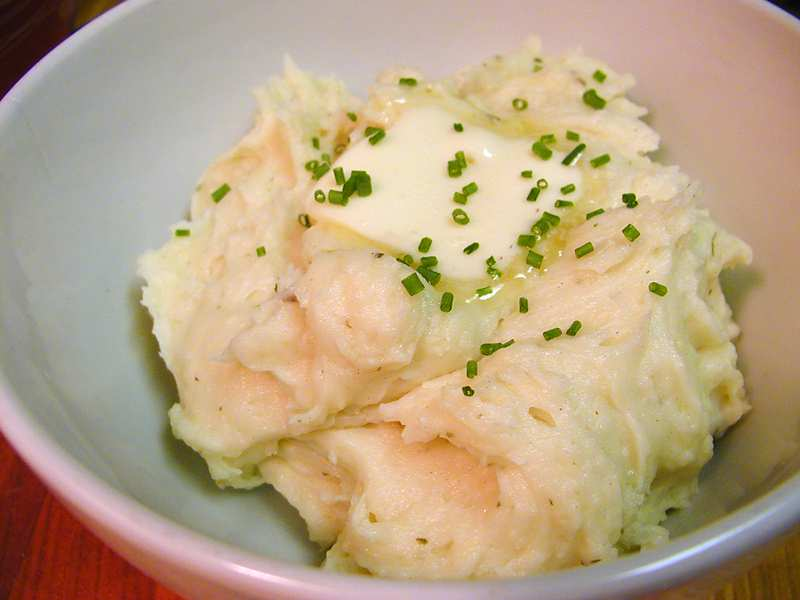
Close-up view of mashed potatoes with butter and chives

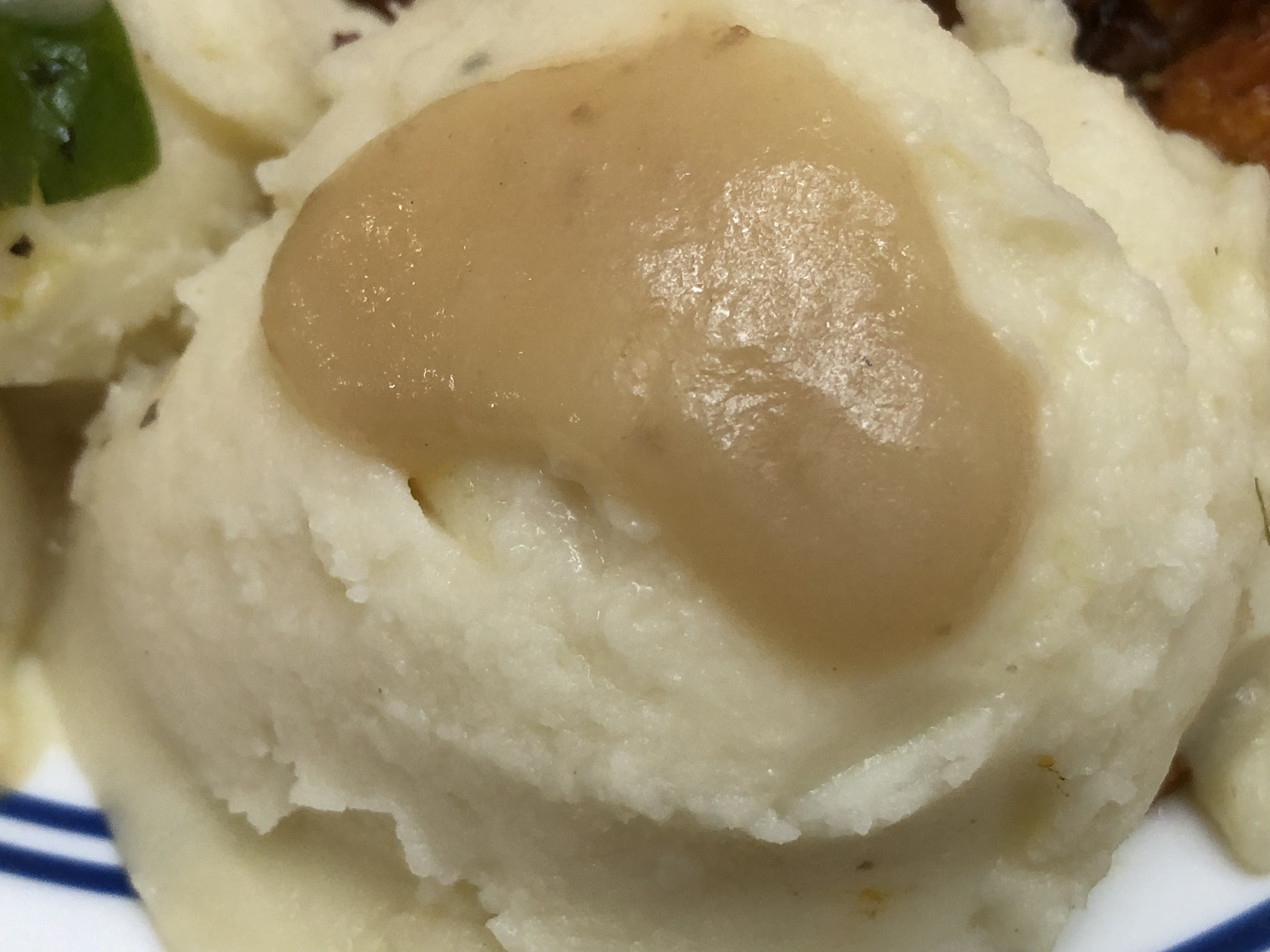
Mashed potatoes and gravy from an American supermarket

== Culinary uses ==
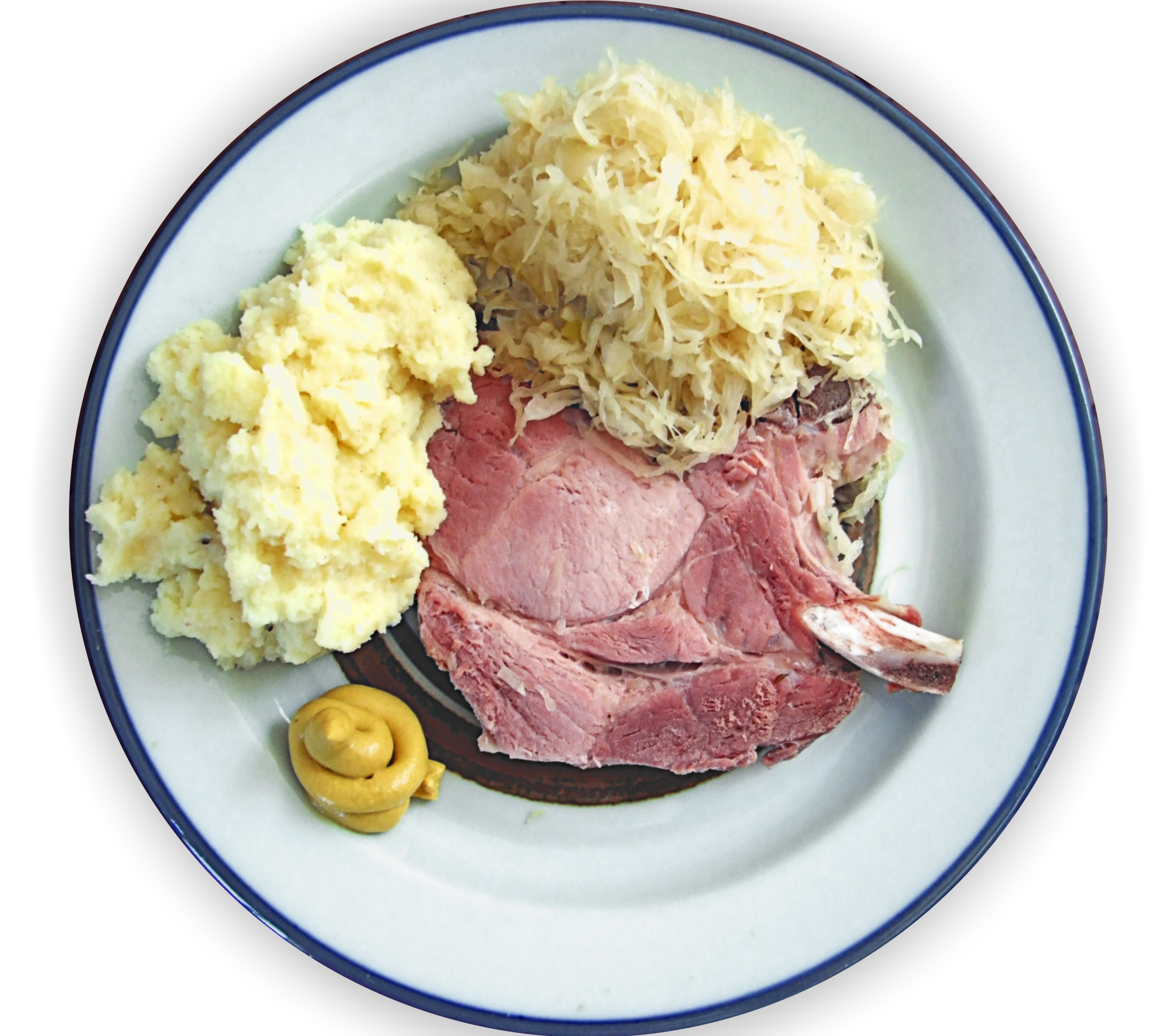
Mashed potato served with Frankfurter Rippchen, sauerkraut and mustard

Mashed potato can be served as a side dish. In Britain and parts of Ireland, sausages served with mashed potatoes are known as bangers and mash. Mashed potato can be an ingredient of various other dishes, including shepherd's and cottage pie, Orkney clapshot, pierogi, colcannon, champ, dumplings, potato pancakes, potato croquettes, and gnocchi. Particularly runny mashed potatoes are called mousseline potatoes.

In the United Kingdom, cold mashed potato can be mixed with fresh eggs and then fried until crisp to produce a potato cake. This dish is thought to have originated in Cornwall and is a popular breakfast item. When the potato is combined with cooked cabbage or similar vegetables, the fried dish is known as bubble and squeak; some recipes add meat or other ingredients.

Mashed potatoes may be eaten with gravy. A potato masher can be used to mash the potatoes. A potato ricer produces a uniform, lump-free, mash.

In India, mashed potatoes made with spices, fried or not, are called chaukha. Chaukha is used in samosas in India and with litti, especially in Bihar.

In Kenya, mashed potatoes are eaten in the form of a dish called mukimo, native to the Kikuyu tribe. The dish mainly incorporates corn and peas along with other ingredients into the potatoes. It is often served with grilled meat, known as nyama choma, which could be either goat or beef.

In Turkey, mashed potatoes made with milk, salt, black pepper, and butter are called patates puresi.

Pagash is made from mashed potatoes, dough, and cheese, and sometimes called ‘Slavic pizza’ or ‘Polish pizza. It originated as a Lenten dish in Slavic regions, and is popular in Northeastern Pennsylvania and Southwestern Pennsylvania due to the large population of Catholic immigrants from those regions.

== See also ==
- Aligot
- Champ
- Fufu
- Hachis Parmentier
- Hutspot
- List of Irish dishes
- List of potato dishes
- Mince and tatties
- Perkedel
