= Ojapi =

Ojapi is a parish in the northwestern subregion of Uganda. Originally part of Tara Subcounty, it was carved out to form Ajira Subcounty in the Maracha East Constituency, Maracha District. It is also referred to as Ulupi Parish.

Villages in Ojapi Parish include Aliamu, Baria, Erivu, Nacara, Oliapi, Onayi, and Palida. Neighboring parishes are Anivu, Ombavu, Pajama, and Vura, which host the Tara headquarters.

== Ojapi Air Raid (1991) ==
On 20 September 1991, at around 11:45 AM, two Antonov planes flew from the Sudan-Uganda border and bombed Ojapi Primary School, Uliapi Church, and the surrounding neighborhood, causing serious damage and casualties. The attack resulted in deaths (including Charles Driwale, a student in P3, and the pregnant Mary Jackson), leg amputations (such as Isaac Azabo and Philliam Debo) plus destroyed houses (owned by Jackson Sadraka and Joel Otoma). Michael Afimani witnessed five bombs drop, with two hitting a hill near the school and three on the premises. Jimmy Aluma, the Headteacher of Ojapi Primary School also witnessed the bombing and had his child injured. The survivors formed an umbrella organization called the Ojapi Air Raid Victims Compensation and Rehabilitation Association. In October 2014, under Chairman Philliam Debo (Leader of Ojapi Clan), they wrote to the President of Uganda, requesting compensation.

== Education ==
Ojapi Parish hosts Ojapi Primary School.

== Culture ==
Ojapi Catholic Church, St. John Church of Uganda (COU) are present.

The grasshopper is a seasonal staple food and emblem of Maracha, the Lugbara clan in Ojapi.

== Geography ==
Hills visible in Ojapi, viewed anticlockwise from Mt. Liru in the north, include Kodro, Gala, Kadri, Adrofiya, Njeke (or Njakai), Orani, Luturujo, and Adada. Mt. Wati is to the east. Red monkeys, rock badgers, porcupines, and other animals inhabit the area. Various streams, small rivers, and forests are nearby.

== Economy ==
Agriculture is the predominant economic activity. Crops include maize, cassava, ground nut, soya, coffee, beans, and tobacco, which is an important cash crop. Animals include cows, goats, sheep, guineafowls, chickens, and pigs. On market days, such as those in Ajira, people sell foodstuffs and other household items. Other occupations include teachers, priests, engineers, politicians, businesspeople, and other professionals.

== See also ==
- Lugbara cuisine
- Lugbara language
- Lugbara music
