= Pogača =

Bread baked in the ashes of a fireplace

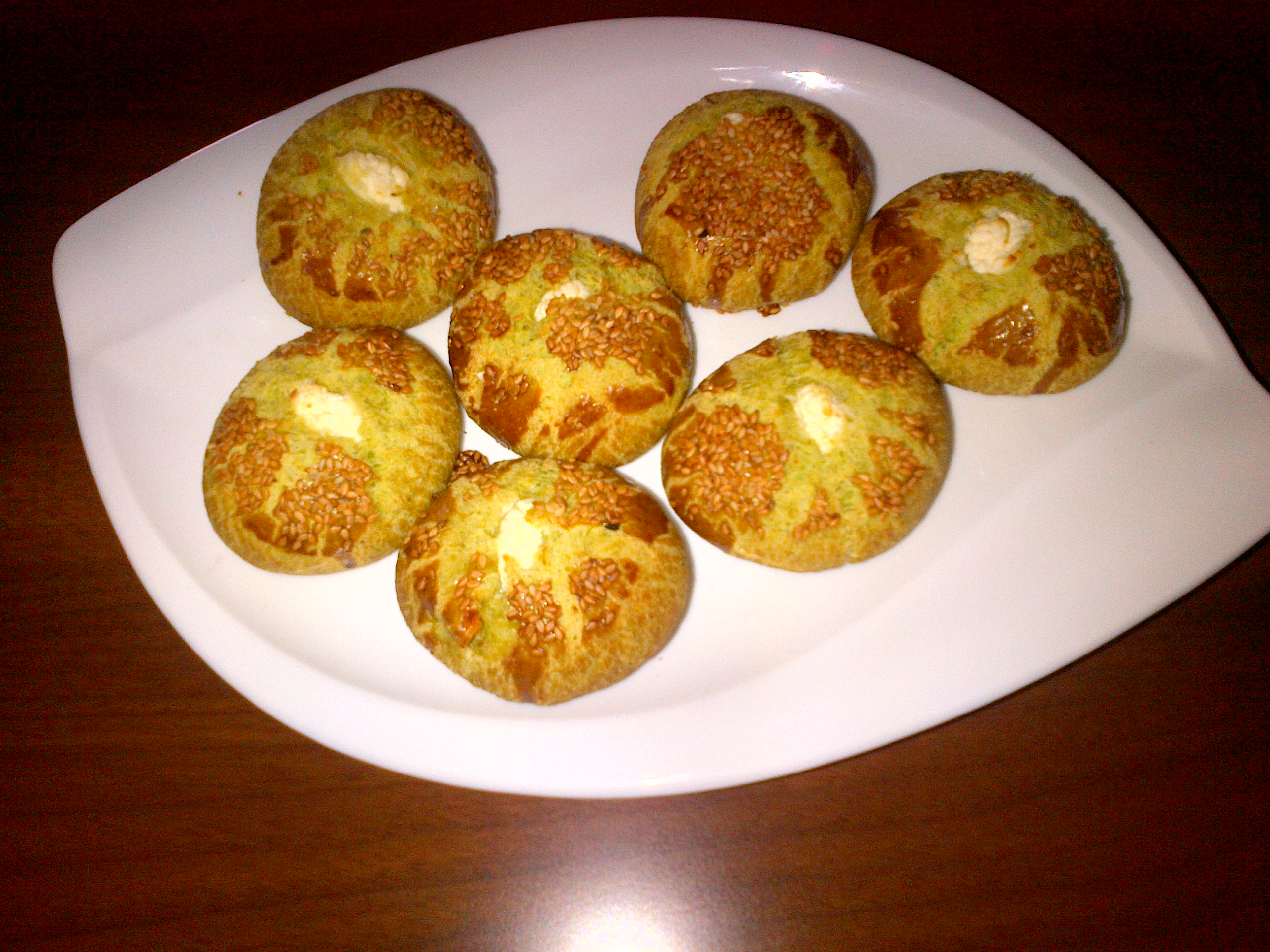
- Poğaça stuffed with lor cheese and dill
- Alternative names: Pogacha, Pogácsa
- Type: Bread
- Main ingredients: White flour or whole-wheat flour, usually yeast, egg, butter
- Variations: White cheese filling, sucuk, pastirma, ground beef, potato, olive
- Food energy (per serving): 196kcal per 45 gr

Pogača (Cyrillic: погача; Turkish: poğaça; Hungarian: pogácsa) is a type of bread baked in the ashes of the fireplace, and later in modern ovens. Found in the cuisines of Turkey, Hungary, Slovakia, the Balkans, and the Levant; it can be leavened or unleavened, though the latter is considered more challenging to make. It is generally made from wheat flour, but barley and sometimes rye may be added. It can be stuffed with potatoes, ground beef, olive, or cheese, and have grains and herbs like sesame, black nigella seed, or dried dill in the dough or sprinkled on top.

== Terminology ==
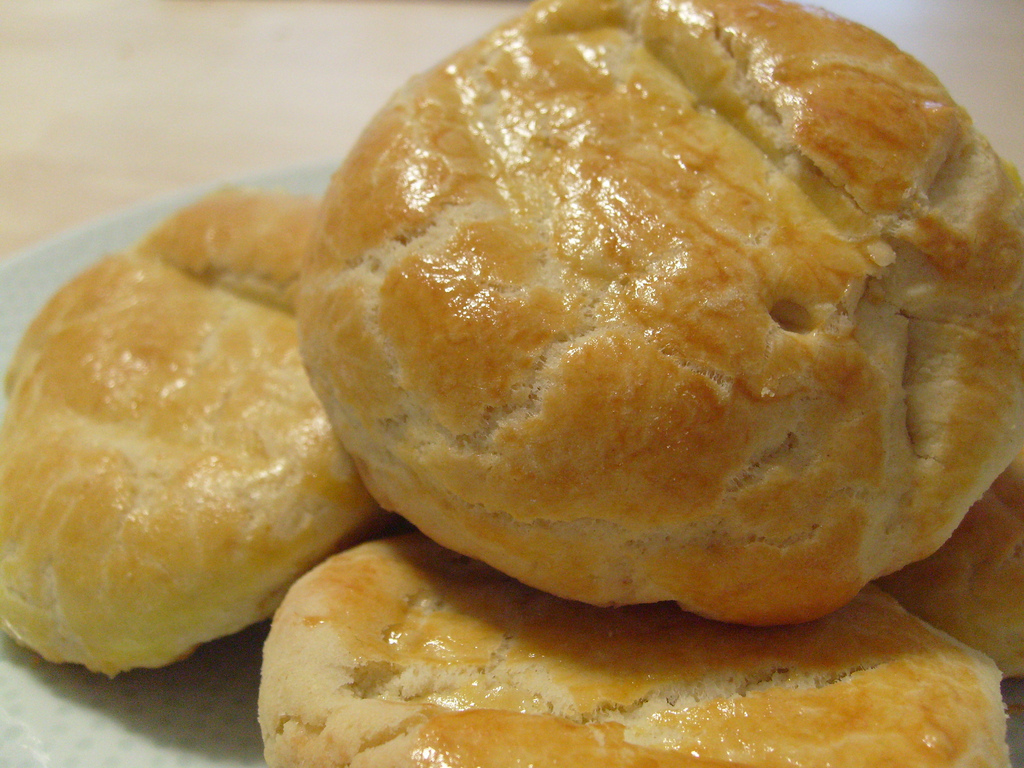
Pogácsa from Hungary. Typical varieties are prepared with potato, cheese, or cracklings.

The word derives ultimately from the Latin panis focacius, i.e. bread (panis) baked on the hearth or fireplace (focus), via the Byzantine Greek πογάτσα (pogátsa), thence entering the South Slavic languages as pogača / погача.

A variant is known as pogačice (diminutive form), a type of puff pastry eaten in Bosnia and Herzegovina, Bulgaria, Croatia, Kosovo, Montenegro, North Macedonia, Serbia, Slovenia, and Turkey (where it is called poğaça) with variations like karaköy. It is called pogatschen in Austria, and pagáče in Slovakia. It is known by similar names in other languages: pogácsa (Hungarian), pogace (Romanian), Greek: μπουγάτσα 'bughátsa', Bulgarian, Macedonian and Serbian Cyrillic: погача, Albanian: pogaçe, Arabic: بغاشة, romanized: buḡāšah or بغاجة buḡājah.

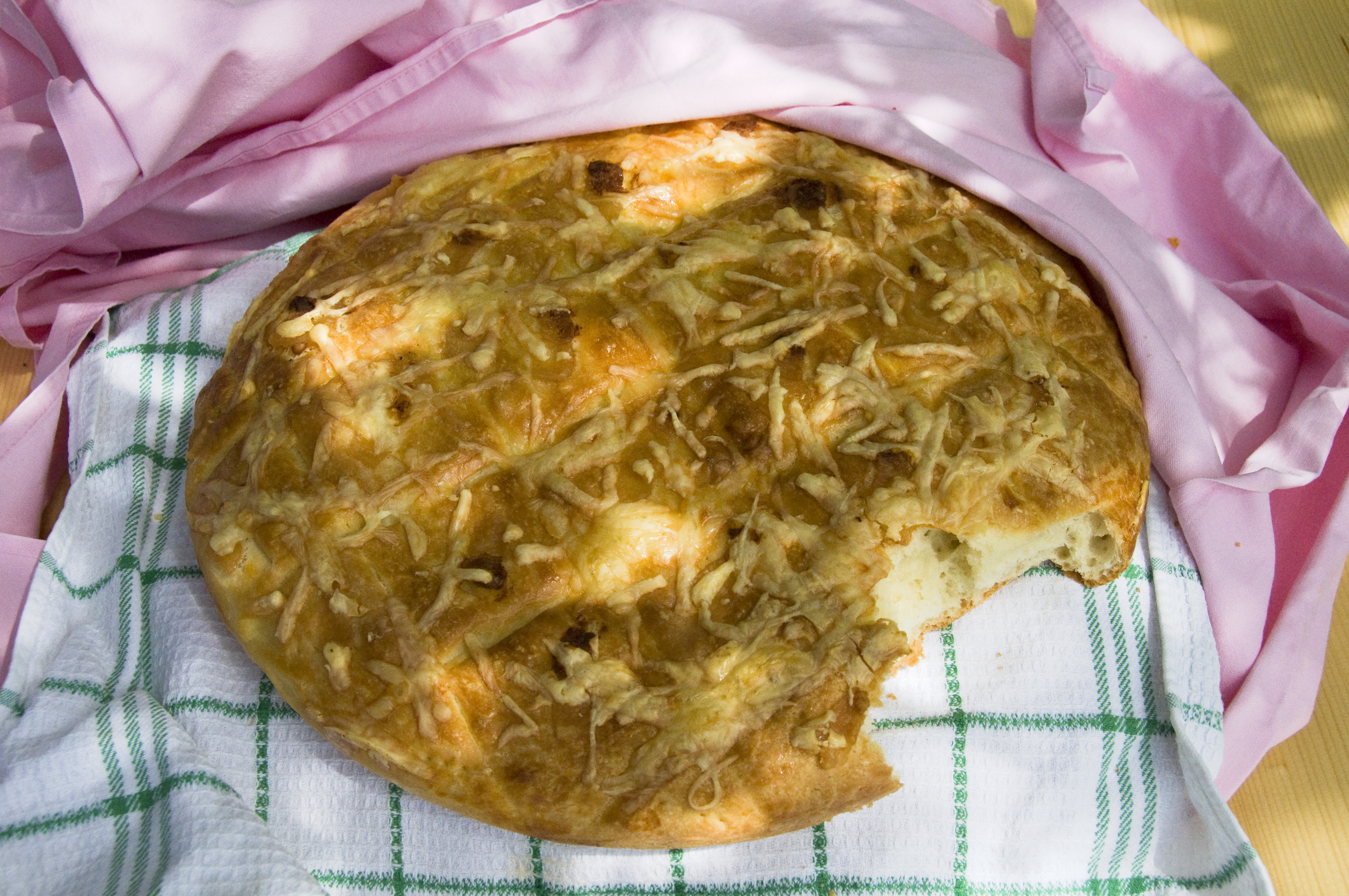
Slovenian belokranjska pogača

== Description ==
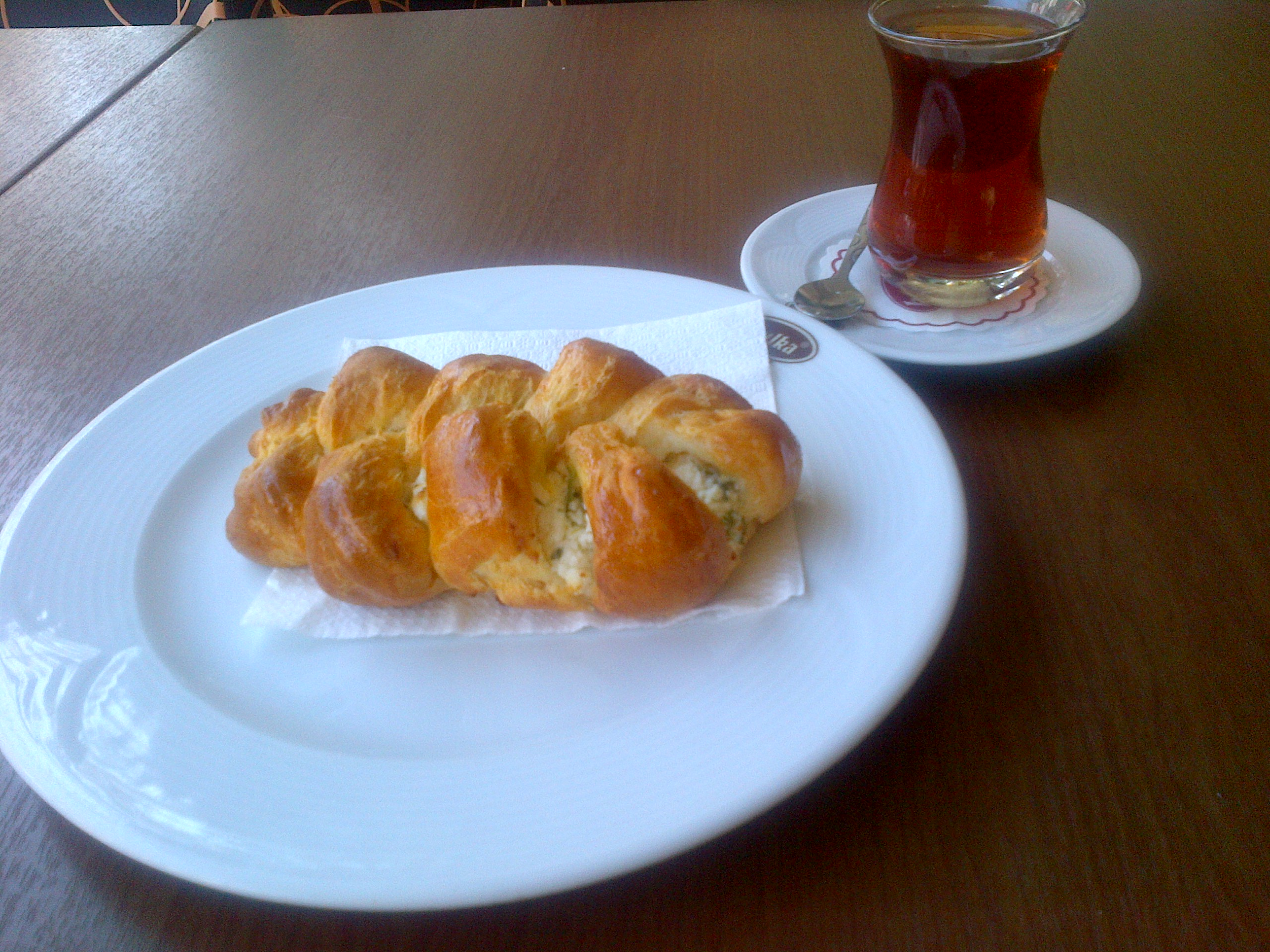
Turkish tea and peynirli poğaça

Different localities make slightly different varieties of pogača, and thus there is a wide variety of textures and flavors. Some may be just an inch in diameter; others are much larger. Others have a crumbly scone-like consistency inside, while others are more tender like a fresh dinner roll or croissant.

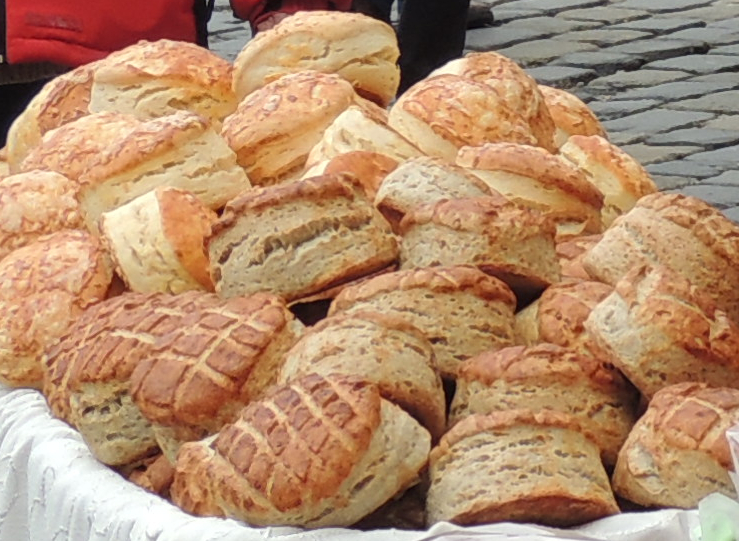
Pork crackling pogácsa

In Hungary it is considered to be a cultural specialty and a Hungarikum. It evolved from small flat breads. Although the pastry was adopted from the Turks, many of its variations, such as the pork rind pogácsa (tepertős pogácsa), were born in Hungary and have been a popular dish since the Middle Ages. Popular flavours include potato, cheese, pork crackling, tejföl, túró, juhtúró, garlic and woodgarlic, poppy seed (mákos pogácsa), paprika (paprikás pogácsa), pumpkin seed, and cabbage.

The cookbook of the Hungarian Piarist monk Kristóf Simai, written in Selmecbánya between 1795 and 1799, contains a wide variety of other pogácsas such as the honey pogácsa, butter pogácsa, spicy scones and chocolate scones.

In Hungary boszorkánypogácsa (witches' pogácsa) is a popular, but totally different pastry. It is a small, sweet, usually blueberry- or peach- jam or vanilla filled biscuit.

In Syrian and Turkish cuisine, poğaça can be filled with beyaz peynir (white cheese), or other fillings like black olives, potatoes, onions or ground beef.

== During celebrations ==
In Hungary the pastry is commonly used during celebrations, served as an appetizer or side dish, but it also has a role in the holidays. On Old Year's Day, a so-called tollaspogácsa was made, and it was customary to ritually stir a feather into each piece before baking. This was then used as a fortune-telling tool. Before baking, each family member chooses a feather to knead into the dough. If the feather hidden in the biscuit is burnt by the time the tollaspogácsa is baked, they are said not to live the occasion next year. In other places the ritual is held on January 25th (Pálforduló - Feast of Paul's conversion) so the dish is often called pálpogácsa, named after the saint.

The pastry is also used during the Ballagás ceremony, where they are added to satchels of departing highschoolers.

== See also ==
- List of pastries
- Boyoz
- Bougatsa
- Fatayer
- Kumru (sandwich)
- Nokul
- Pirozhki
- Pagash
