= Frankfurter Rippchen =

German meat and potato dish

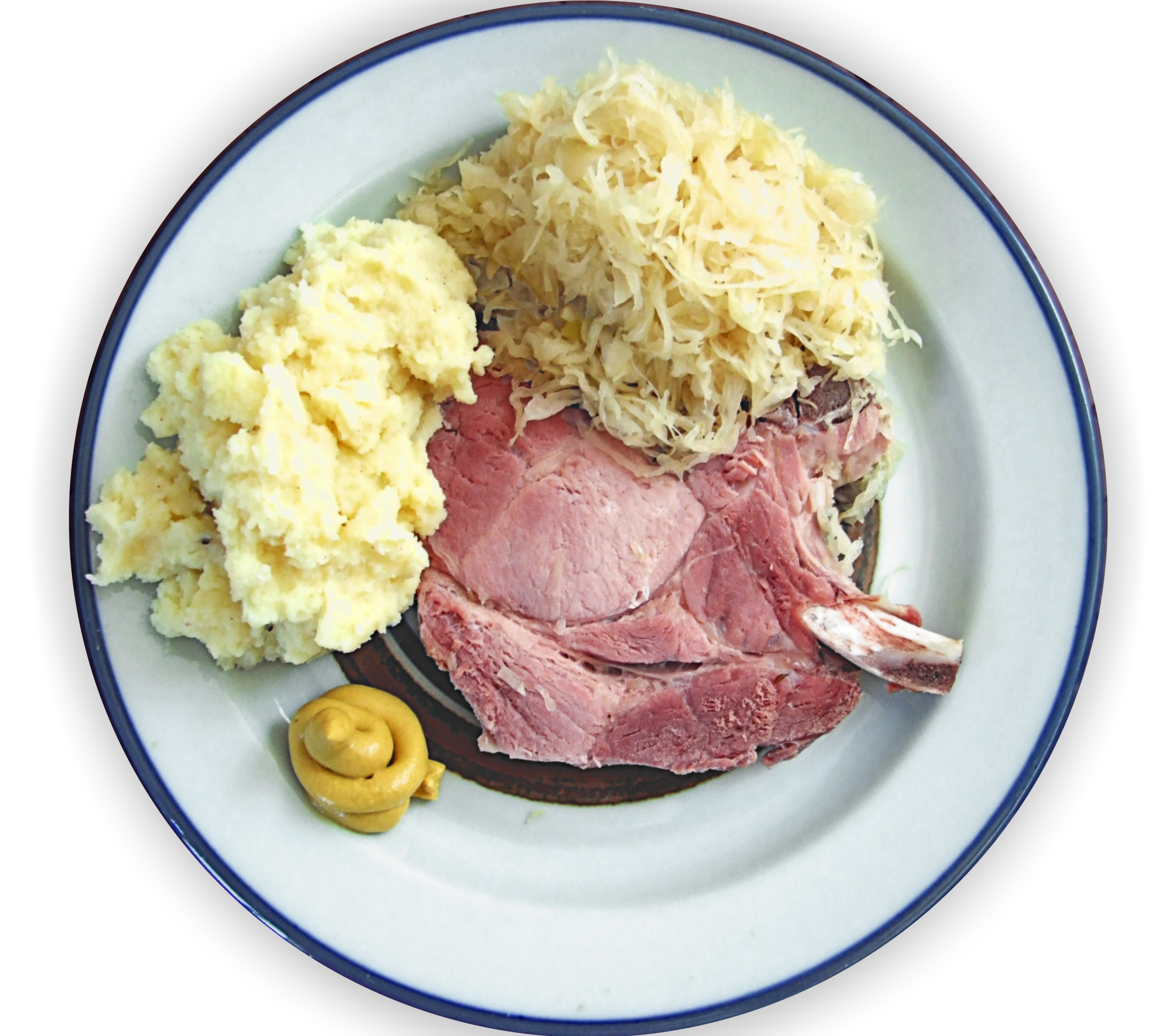
Cured pork cutlet with sauerkraut, mashed potato and mustard

(Frankfurter) Rippchen mit Kraut (hot cured cutlet with sauerkraut) is a traditional dish served in and around Frankfurt am Main, Germany. It consists of cured pork cutlets, slowly heated in sauerkraut or meat broth, and usually served with sauerkraut, mashed potatoes and yellow mustard. Apfelwein (German cider) is normally consumed alongside Rippchen. The Rippchen are similar in appearance and texture to Kassler, but slightly milder in flavour, since they are only cured, rather than smoked.

== See also ==
- Sachsenhausen (Frankfurt am Main)
- List of pork dishes
