= River Enyau =

River in Uganda

River Enyau is one of the longest rivers in West Nile; it empties into the White Nile after flowing from Ezuku Forest Reserve in Vurra (near the DR Congo border) through Arua City, Ayivu and Terego.

== Activities ==
Enyau is a major source of piped tap water in Arua City.

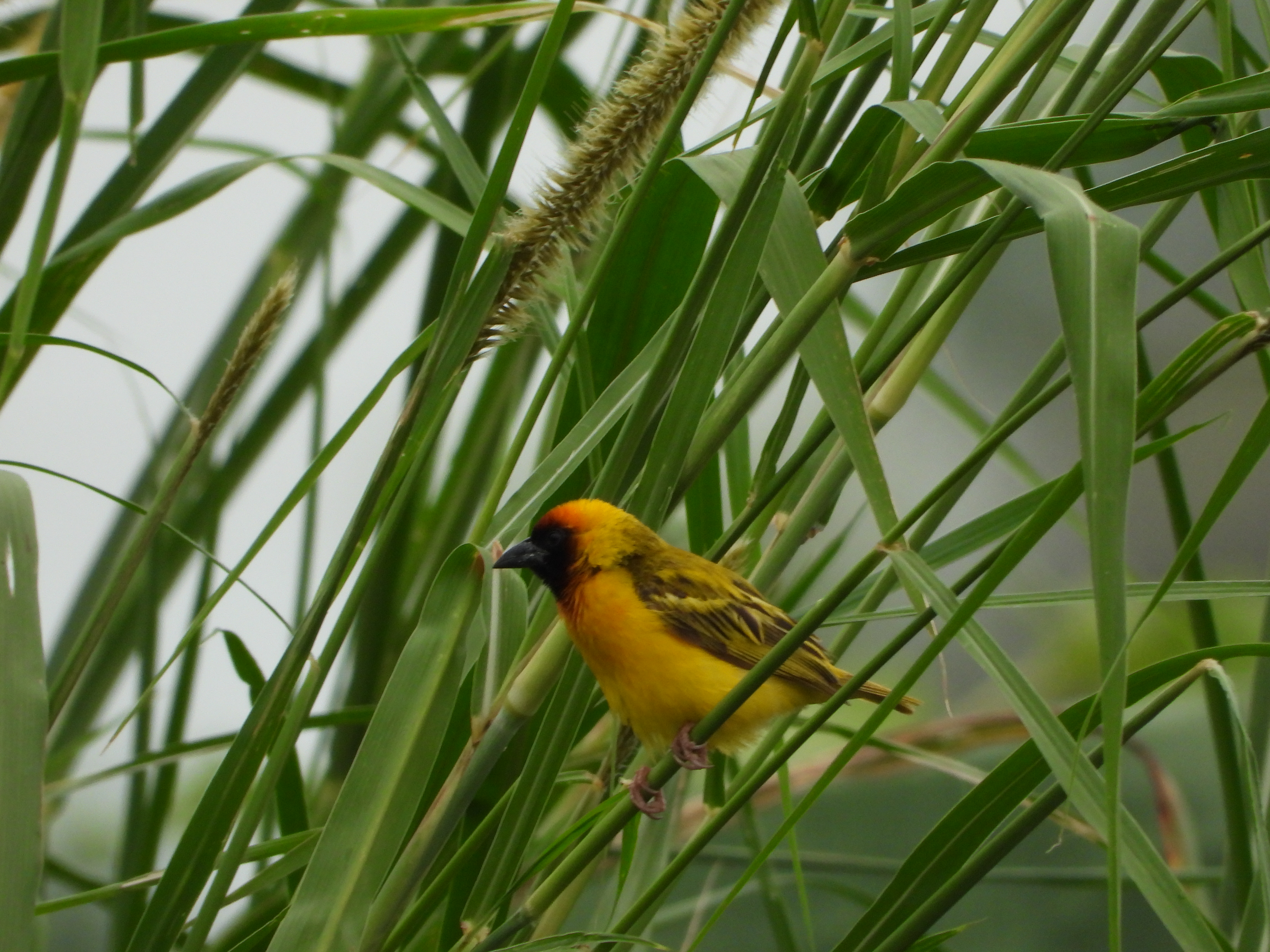
Northern masked weaver

Tourism like birdwatching is also carried out; birds such as the Northern masked weaver can be seen near the river. Recreational venues like Eripak Beach Resort in Ewuata (Arua City) are also set up along the river. Ragem Beach, a meander belt is not far.

Vehicle-washing and agriculture are other activities carried out near Enyau.

Olewa Falls is found on River Enyau in Terego District at the foothills of Mount Wati.

== Efforts to save River Enyau ==
During 2018, WWF, World Bank and NWSC joined hands in a drive to save River Enyau.

In January 2023, the Ministry of Water and Environment launched a US$38,000 project towards the re-demarcation of River Enyau buffer zone in Arua Diatrict, funded by the Global Environment Facility (GEF) and the United Nations Environment Program (UNEP). On Saturday 30 November 2024, MWE through its Northern Regional Office held the first annual "Save River Enyau Marathon" in Arua City starting from OPM Grounds.
