= Mukimo =

Kenyan meal

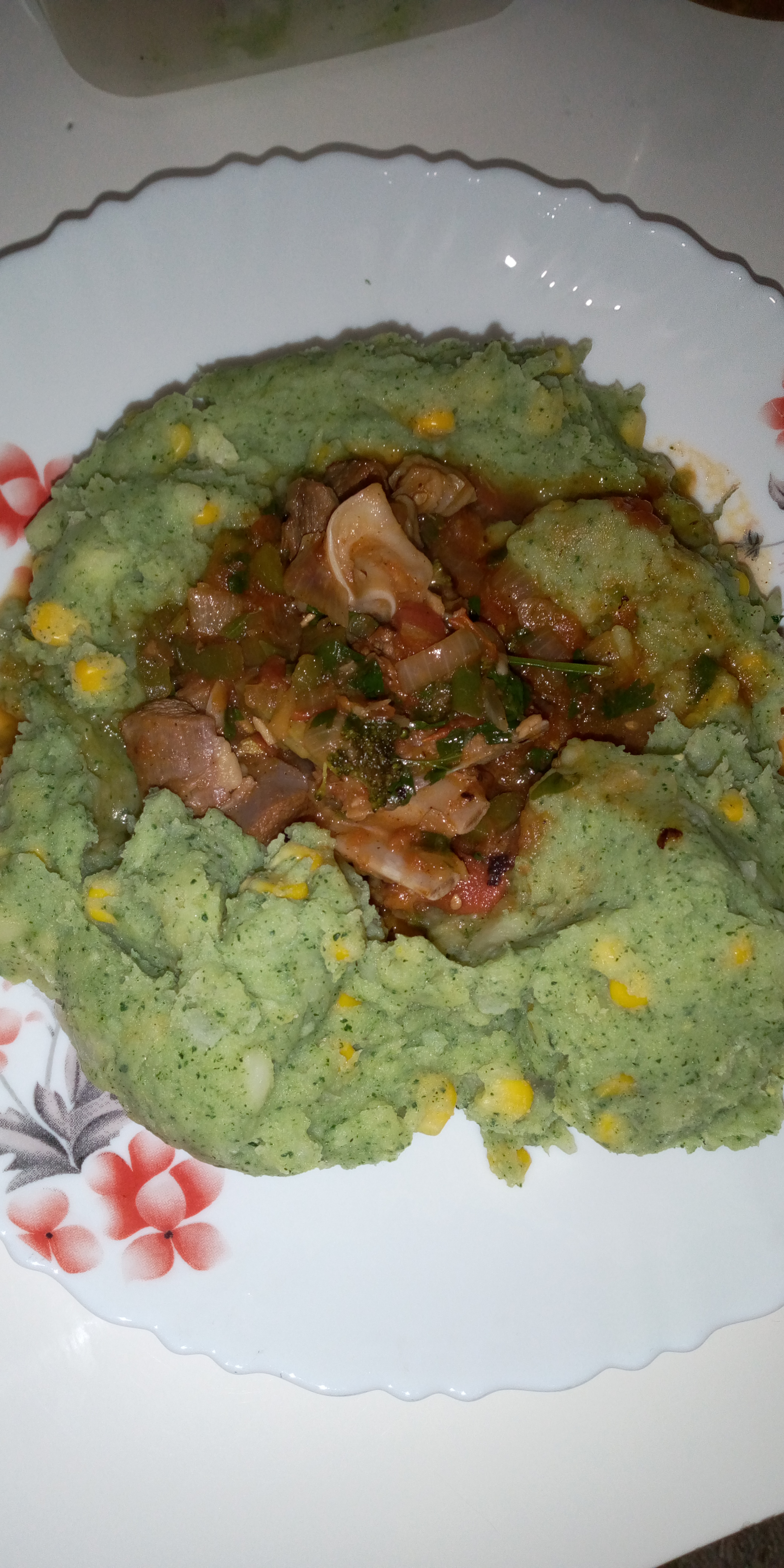
- Mukimo with Beef Stew
- Course: Main course
- Place of origin: Kenya
- Region or state: Mount Kenya region
- Serving temperature: Hot
- Main ingredients: Mashed potatoes, with beans or maize with green vegetables

Mukimo or mokimo (UK: /ˈmuːˈkiːmoʊ/, moo-KEE-moh) is a traditional Kenyan meal (predominantly from communities living around Mount Kenya) prepared by mashing potatoes and green vegetables. It may also include maize and beans. Mukimo is mostly served as an accompaniment for meat-based stew and nyama choma. Though originally from the central part of Kenya, mukimo is now consumed amongst various communities in Kenya.

== Preparation ==
Mukimo is made by boiling potatoes with green vegetables like pumpkin leaves, spinach, or peas. Maize and beans are also sometimes added. After cooking, all the ingredients are mashed together until smooth. Fried onions and spices can be added for better taste. Mukimo is usually served hot with beef stew, chicken, or nyama choma.

The way Mukimo is prepared is different in many parts of Kenya and from one home to another. Some people add soft maize, red beans, or spring onions, while others use pumpkin leaves to give the dish its green colour.
