= Silver fish (fish) =

Fishes with a common name of silver fish or silverfish may include:

- Aphareus rutilans
- Argentina sphyraena
- Argyrozona argyrozona
- Labeobarbus bynni
- Enteromius mattozi
- Callorhinchus milii
- Elops saurus
- Leptatherina presbyteroides
- Megalops atlanticus
- Pseudocaranx dentex
- Raiamas senegalensis
- Steindachnerina argentea
- Trachinotus ovatus
- Trichiurus lepturus
- Ulaema lefroyi
- Antarctic silverfish (Pleuragramma antarcticum)
- A Chinese-to-English translation of whitebait
- Members of the family Salangidae ("dulong" in the Tagalog language).
