= Scottish cuisine =

Culinary traditions of Scotland

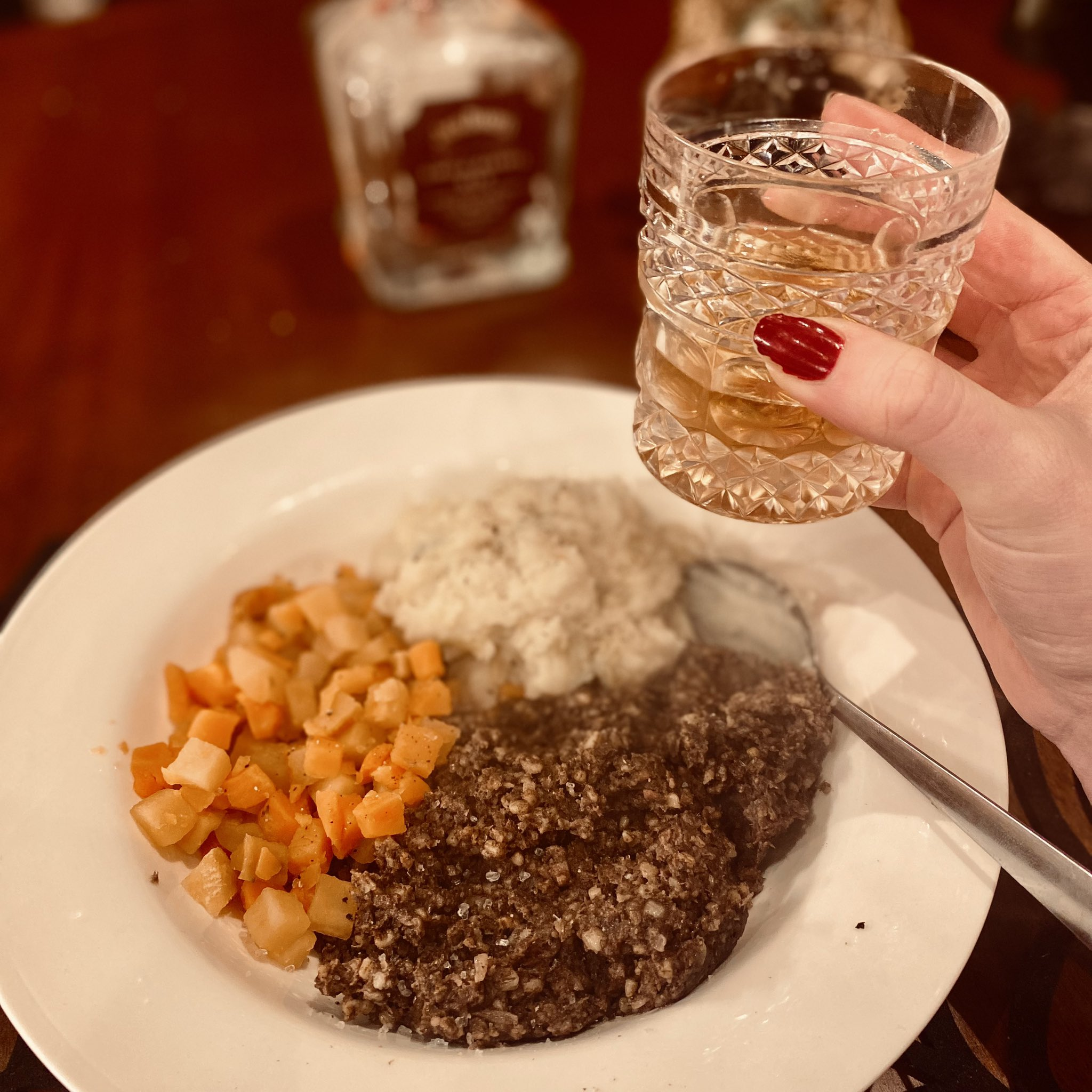
Haggis with neeps and tatties and a glass of whisky, as served at a Burns supper

Scottish cuisine (Scots: Scots keukin/cuisine; Scottish Gaelic: Biadh na h-Alba) encompasses the cooking styles, traditions and recipes associated with Scotland. It has distinctive attributes and recipes of its own, but also shares much with other British and wider European cuisine as a result of local, regional, and continental influences — both ancient and modern.

Scotland's natural larder of vegetables, fruit, oats, fish and other seafood, dairy products and game is the chief factor in traditional Scottish cooking, with a high reliance on simplicity, generally without the use of rare (and historically expensive) spices found abroad.

== History ==
Scotland, with its temperate climate and abundance of indigenous game species, has provided food for its inhabitants for millennia. The wealth of seafood available on and off the coasts provided the earliest settlers with sustenance. Agriculture was introduced, and primitive oats quickly became the staple.

=== Medieval ===
Because meat was an expensive commodity, the lower echelons of mediaeval Scots were most often sustained by other animal products.

This is evident today in traditional Scots fare, with its emphasis on dairy produce. A typical meal in medieval Scotland consisted of a pottage of herbs and roots (and when available some meat, usually seafood, or stock for flavouring), with bread and eggs, cheese, or kelp when possible.

Scotland was a feudal state for the greater part of the second millennium. This put restrictions on what was allowed to be hunted, and therefore eaten. In the halls of the great men of the realm, one could expect venison, boar, various fowl and songbirds, expensive spices (pepper, cloves, cinnamon, etc.), and the meats of domesticated species.

Before Sir Walter Raleigh's introduction of the potato to the British Isles, the Scots' main source of carbohydrate was bread made from oats or barley. Wheat was generally difficult to grow because of the damp climate. Food thrift was evident from the earliest times, with excavated middens displaying little evidence of anything but the toughest bones. All parts of an animal were used.

The mobile nature of Scots society required food that would not spoil quickly. It was common to carry a small bag of oatmeal that could be made into a basic porridge or oatcakes using a girdle (griddle). It is thought that Scotland's national dish, haggis, originated in a similar way: a small amount of offal or low-quality meat, carried in the most inexpensive bag available, a sheep or pig's stomach. It has also been suggested that this dish was introduced by Norse invaders who were attempting to preserve their food during the long journey from Scandinavia.

=== Early Modern period ===
During the Early Modern period, French cuisine played a role in Scottish cooking due to cultural exchanges brought about by the "Auld Alliance". When Mary, Queen of Scots returned to Scotland, she brought an entourage of French staff who revolutionised Scots cooking, creating some of Scotland's unique food terminology. These terms include Ashet (assiette), a large platter; Cannel (cannelle), cinnamon; Collop (escalope); Gigot, French for a leg of mutton; Howtowdie (hétoudeau), a boiling fowl in Old French; Syboe (ciboule), spring onion.

=== 18th and 19th centuries ===
With the growth of sporting estates and the advent of land enclosure in the 18th century, harvesting Scotland's larder became an industry. Railways further expanded the scope of the market, with Scots grouse at a premium (as today) on English menus shortly after the Glorious Twelfth.

In the 19th century, Charlotte, Lady Clark of Tillypronie collected recipes throughout her life by asking society hostesses or cooks, and then testing them for herself at Tillypronie (Aberdeenshire). These were published posthumously in 1909 as The Cookery Book of Lady Clark of Tillypronie.

=== 20th and 21st centuries ===
The availability of certain foodstuffs in Scotland, as with other parts of the United Kingdom, suffered during the 20th century. Rationing during the two World Wars, as well as large-scale industrial agriculture, limited the diversity of food available to the public. Imports from the British Empire and beyond did, however, introduce new foods to the Scottish public.

During the 19th and 20th centuries there was large-scale immigration to Scotland from Italy, and later from the Middle East, India, and Pakistan. These cultures influenced Scots cooking dramatically. Italians reintroduced the standard of fresh produce, and the latecomers introduced spice. With the growth of the European Union in the early years of the 21st century, there has been an increase in the population of Eastern European descent, from Poland in particular. Several speciality restaurants and delicatessens catering to the various new immigrants have opened in larger towns and cities. Fusions of Scottish and other cuisines have occurred since; an example in recent years being the invention of the haggis pakora.

=== Fast food ===
Scotland's reputation for coronary and related diet-based diseases is a result of the wide consumption of fast food since the latter part of the 20th century. Fish and chip shops (aka chippies) remain extremely popular, and the battered and fried haggis supper remains a favourite. In the area around Edinburgh, the most popular condiment for chip shop meals is "salt and sauce", the sauce element consisting of brown sauce thinned with water and vinegar. However in Glasgow, and elsewhere, chippy sauce is relatively unheard of and ketchup or salt and vinegar are preferred, prompting light-hearted debate on the merits of the options among the cities' residents, who tend to find the alternative a baffling concept.

Outlets selling pizzas, kebabs, pakoras and other convenience food have also become increasingly popular, with an extreme example of this style of food being the munchy box.

In addition to independent fast-food outlets, in the 1960s American-style burger bars and other restaurants such as Wimpy were introduced, and in the 1980s, McDonald's, Burger King, Pizza Hut and Kentucky Fried Chicken appeared in Scotland, followed by a large number of Subway franchises in the early 21st century. Branches of Greggs offering cakes, pastries and sandwiches are also very commonly found on the high streets of Scotland, often alongside smaller competing bakeries.

== Dishes and foods ==
These dishes and foods are traditional to or originate in Scotland.

=== Cakes, breads and confectionery ===
- Bannocks, flat quick bread
- Berwick cockles, white-coloured sweet with red stripes
- Black bun, a fruit cake completely covered with pastry
- Butteries or rowies, savoury bread rolls
- Caramel shortbread
- Digestive biscuits
- Drop scones, a type of pancake
- Dundee cake, a fruit cake with a rich flavour
- Ecclefechan tart
- Edinburgh rock, a soft and crumbly confection
- Empire biscuit, two shortbread biscuits with jam between, white icing and a cherry on top
- Fatty cutties, a girdle cake
- Festy cock, an oatmeal pancake
- Fruit slice or flies' graveyard, sweet pastries with currants or raisins
- Hawick balls, peppermint-flavoured boiled sweet
- Jethart Snails, boiled sweets in the shape of a snail
- Lucky tattie, white fondant with cassia, covered with cinnamon
- Moffat toffee, notable for its tangy but sweet centre
- Morning rolls, airy, chewy bread rolls
- Oatcakes, flatbread similar to a cracker, biscuit, or pancake
- Pan drops, a white, round, mint-flavoured boiled sweet with a hard shell and soft middle
- Pan loaf, a bread loaf baked in a pan or tin
- Penguin biscuits
- Plain loaf, formerly and traditionally the most common form of bread
- Puff candy, sugary toffee with a light, rigid, sponge-like texture
- Scones
- Scots crumpets, broadly similar to the pikelet
- Scottish macaroon, made with a paste of potato and sugar, and often chocolate
- Selkirk bannock; variations include Yetholm bannock—types of flat quick bread
- Shortbread, biscuit usually made from sugar, butter, and wheat flour; variations include "petticoat tails"
- Soor ploom, sharp-flavoured, round, green boiled sweet
- Star rock
- Tablet, a medium-hard, sugary confection
- Tattie scone (potato scone), a Scottish variant of the savoury griddle scone
- Tunis cake
- Well-fired rolls, well-baked morning rolls

=== Cereals ===
- Brose, an uncooked porridge
- Porridge
- Sowans, a sour oat porridge
- Skirlie, oatmeal fried with fat, onions and seasonings

=== Dairy ===
- Bishop Kennedy, soft, round, brie-like cheese with a yellowish runny interior
- Bonchester, soft cheese with a white rind
- Caboc, cream cheese
- Crowdie, soft, fresh cows' milk cheese
- Dunlop cheese, originating in Dunlop in East Ayrshire
- Gigha, a Dunlop-style cheese, long-produced on the Isle of Gigha
- Isle of Mull cheddar
- Lanark Blue, a rich, blue-veined artisan sheep's milk cheese
- Teviotdale cheese, full-fat, hard, cows’ milk cheese

=== Fast food and takeaway ===
- Deep-fried Mars bar, a novelty confection deep-fried in fish and chip shops
- Fish and chips, fried fish in crispy batter, served with chips
- Haggis pakora
- Killie pie, a football pie
- Munchy box, a selection of takeaway items served in a pizza box
- Pizza crunch, a whole or sliced deep-fried, battered pizza

=== Fish and seafood ===
- Arbroath smokies, a type of smoked haddock, a speciality of the town of Arbroath in Angus
- Cabbie claw (cabelew), young cod in white sauce with chopped egg whites
- Crappit heid, fish head stuffed with oats, suet and liver
- Eyemouth pale, cold-smoked haddock with light golden hue and subtle smoky flavour
- Finnan haddie, another cold-smoked haddock originating in Findon, Aberdeenshire
- Kippers, a whole herring butterflied, salted or pickled, and cold-smoked
- Kedgeree, a dish containing rice, smoked haddock, eggs, parsley, butter or cream
- Rollmops, pickled herring rolled up with onion, gherkin or green olive, with pimento (on a stick)
- Scampi
- Smoked salmon
- Tatties and herring

=== Fruit ===
- Blaeberries – not identical to North American blueberries
- Raspberries
- Slaes
- Strawberries
- Tayberries

=== Meat, poultry and game ===
- Ayrshire middle bacon, a specially cured bacon
- Balmoral chicken
- Black pudding (including Stornoway black pudding), red pudding, fruit pudding and white pudding, savoury puddings consisting of meat, fat and cereal
- Forfar bridie, a meat and onion-filled pastry
- Chicken tikka masala, roasted marinated chicken in curry
- Collops, an escalope, thick slice of meat off the bone cut across the grain
- Haggis, a savoury pudding containing sheep's pluck (heart, liver and lungs) and several other ingredients, often considered the national dish of Scotland
- Howtowdie with Drappit eggs, young hen with poached eggs
- Kilmeny Kail, a dish originating in Fife consisting of rabbit, bacon, and either cabbage or kale
- Mince and tatties, minced beef with potatoes, onions and often carrots
- Mutton ham, lamb ham
- Pottit heid (brawn), a head cheese
- Potted hough, another head cheese
- Reestit mutton, salted meat traditional to the Shetland Islands and considered the archipelago's "national dish"
- Roast Aberdeen Angus beef
- Roast haunch of venison
- Roast grouse
- Roast woodcock/snipe
- Solan goose or guga (gannet) in the Western Isles
- Scotch pie, a double-crust meat pie, usually containing mutton
- Lorne sausage, a square-shaped sausage meat, not encased and mostly served for breakfast
- Stovies, slow-stewed potatoes, often onions and meat

=== Preserves and spreads ===
- Dundee marmalade
- Rowan jelly
- Heather honey

=== Puddings and desserts ===
- Apple frushie (variant of apple tart)
- Burnt cream, also known as Crème brûlée or Trinity cream.
- Blaeberry pie
- Carrageen pudding, a milk pudding thickened with seaweed
- Clootie dumpling, a traditional pudding made with flour, breadcrumbs and dried fruit
- Cranachan, similar to Atholl Brose, a dessert containing cream, oats, whisky and sometimes raspberries
- Hatted kit, a milk pudding
- Marmalade pudding, made with stale bread, dried fruit, marmalade, milk and eggs
- Stapag, Fuarag, oats with cold water and cold milk respectively
- Tipsy laird, a trifle made with whisky or Drambuie, custard and raspberries

=== Soups ===
- Cullen skink, a thick soup made of smoked haddock, potato and onion
- Baud bree, hare broth
- Cock-a-leekie, a soup made with leeks, peppered chicken stock, often served with rice or barley
- Game soup, a soup made of meat products found in game
- Hairst bree (or hotch potch), a one-pot dish, usually with lamb or mutton and seasonal vegetables
- Partan bree, seafood soup with crab and rice
- Powsowdie, a Scottish sheep's heid (head) broth or soup
- Scotch broth, soup with barley, lamb or mutton and root vegetables

=== Vegetables ===
- Clapshot, a side dish made with potatoes, swedes, chives and butter, served with oatcakes
- Curly kail
- Neeps and tatties (swede turnip and potatoes)
- Rumbledethumps, a traditional dish from the Scottish Borders with main ingredients of potato, cabbage and onion, similar to Bubble and squeak
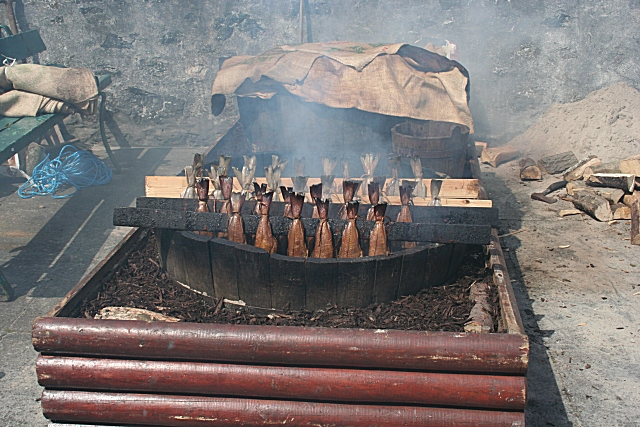
Arbroath smokies

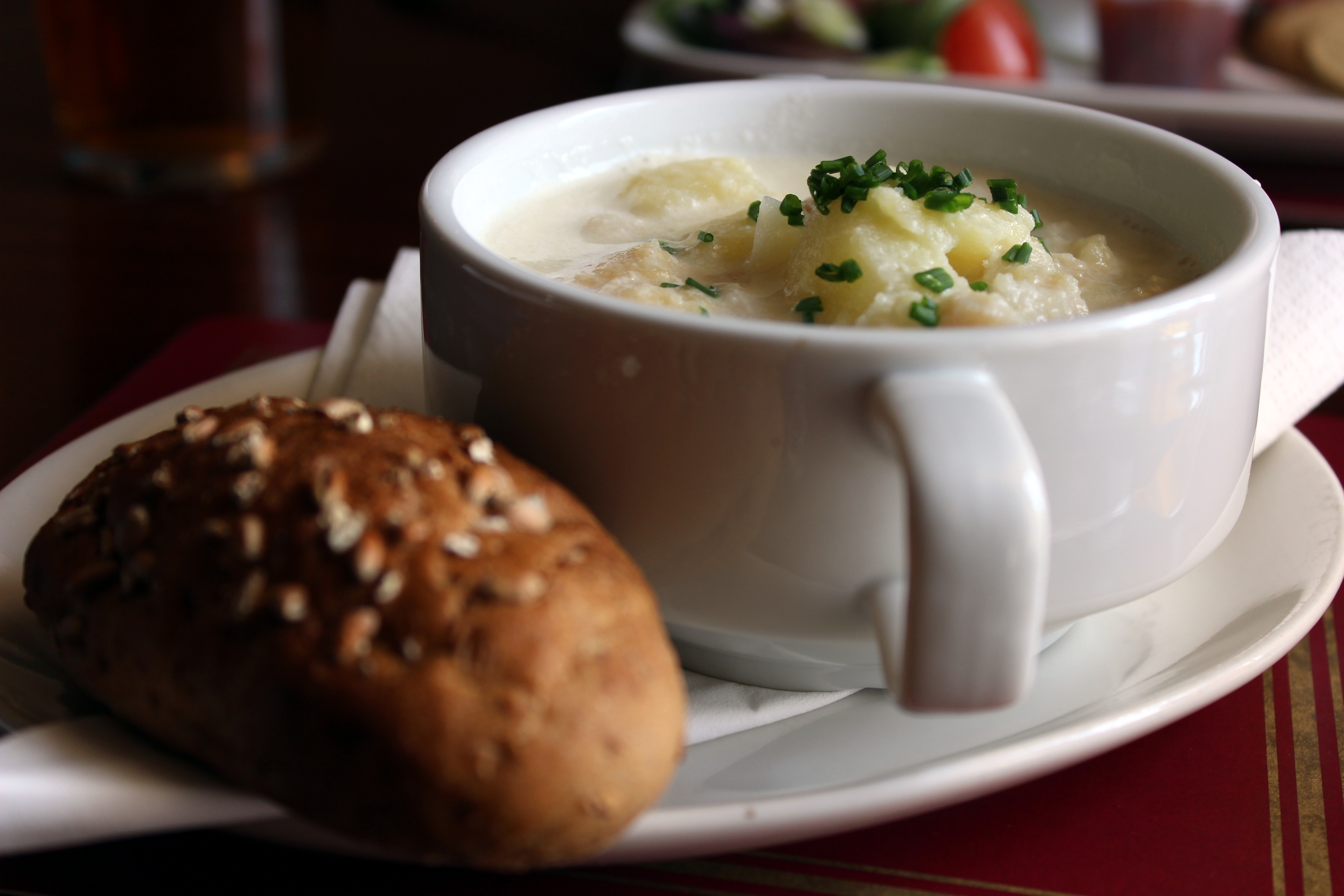
Cullen skink (right), served with bread

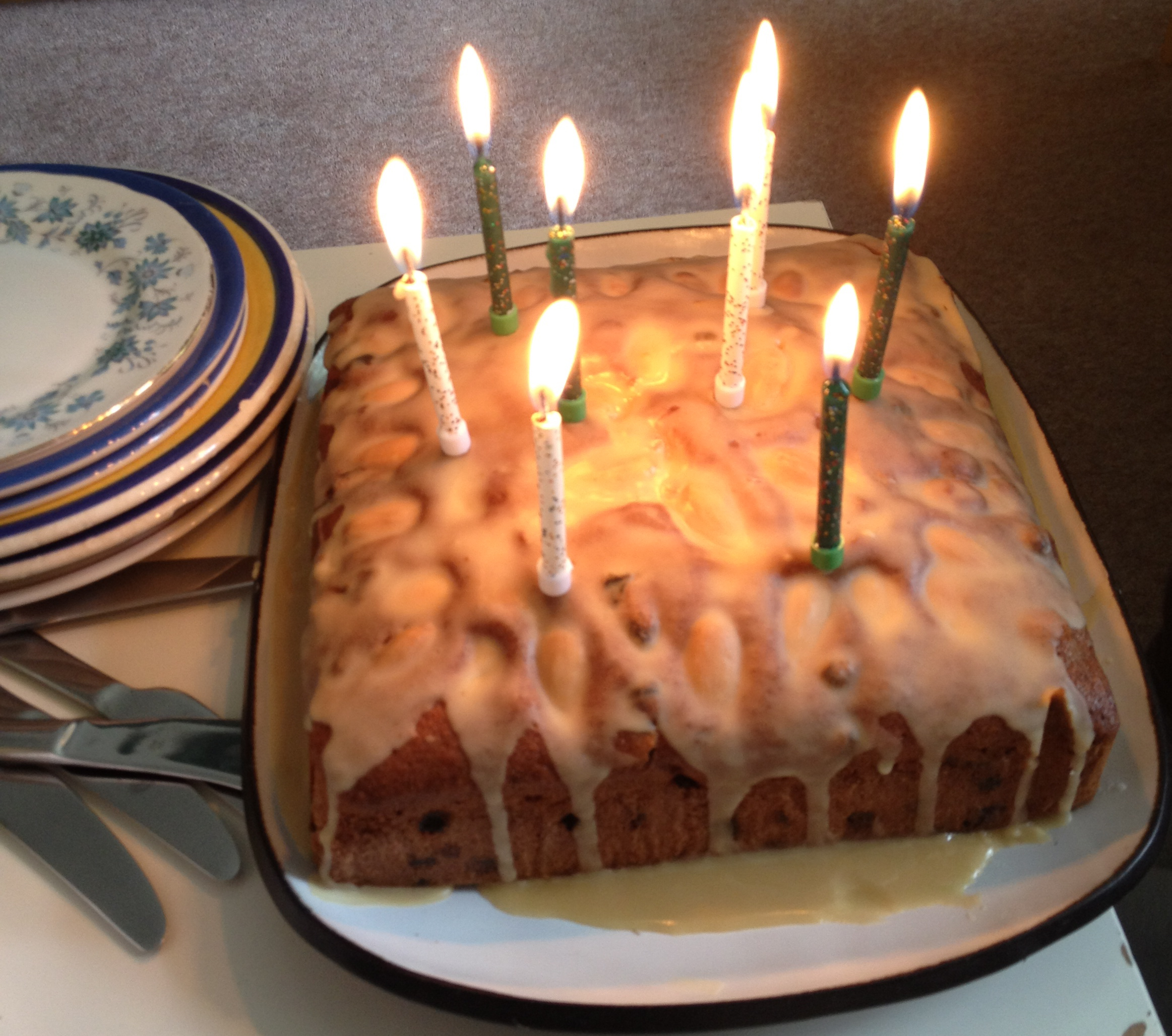
Dundee cake

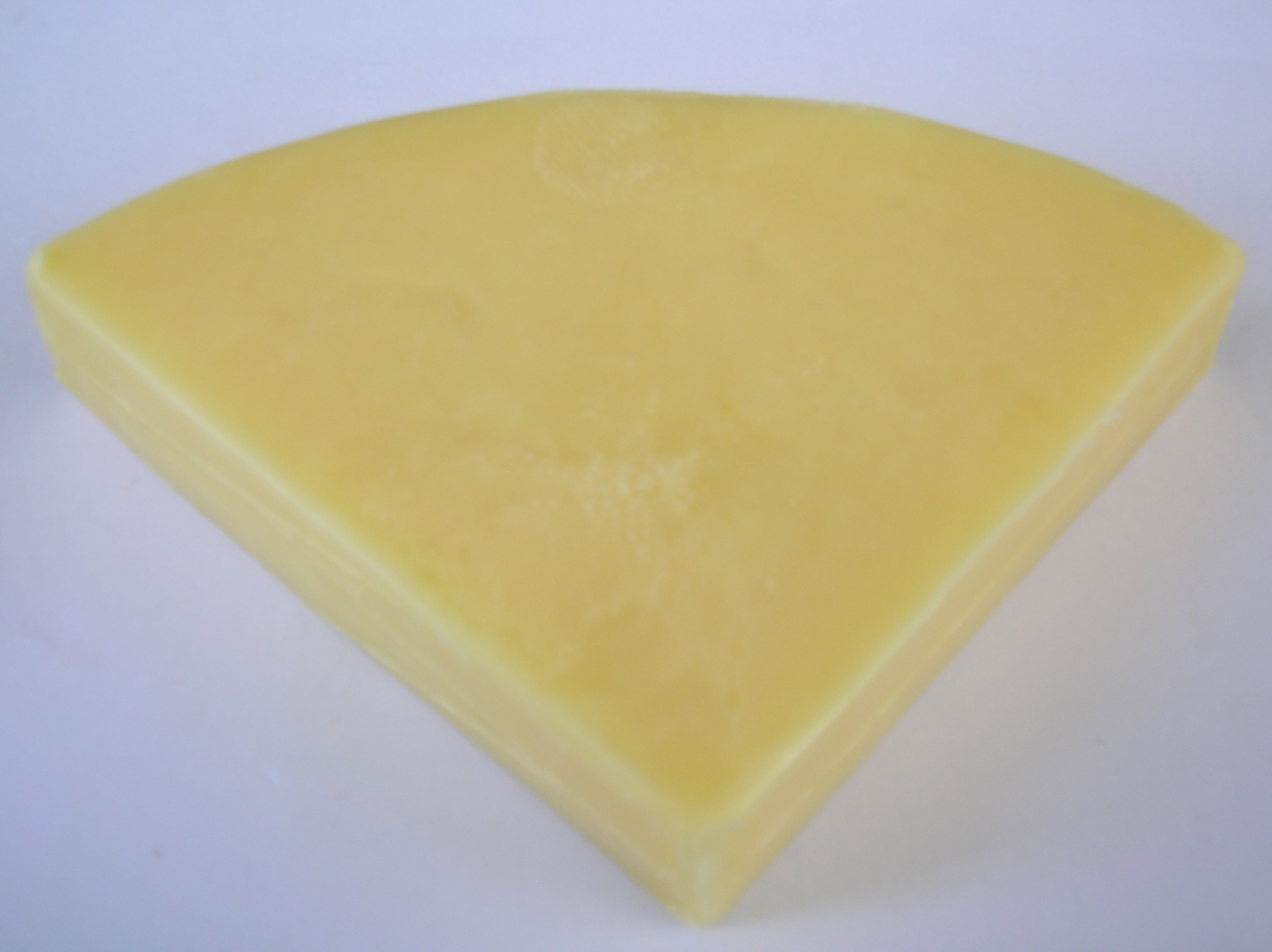
Dunlop cheese

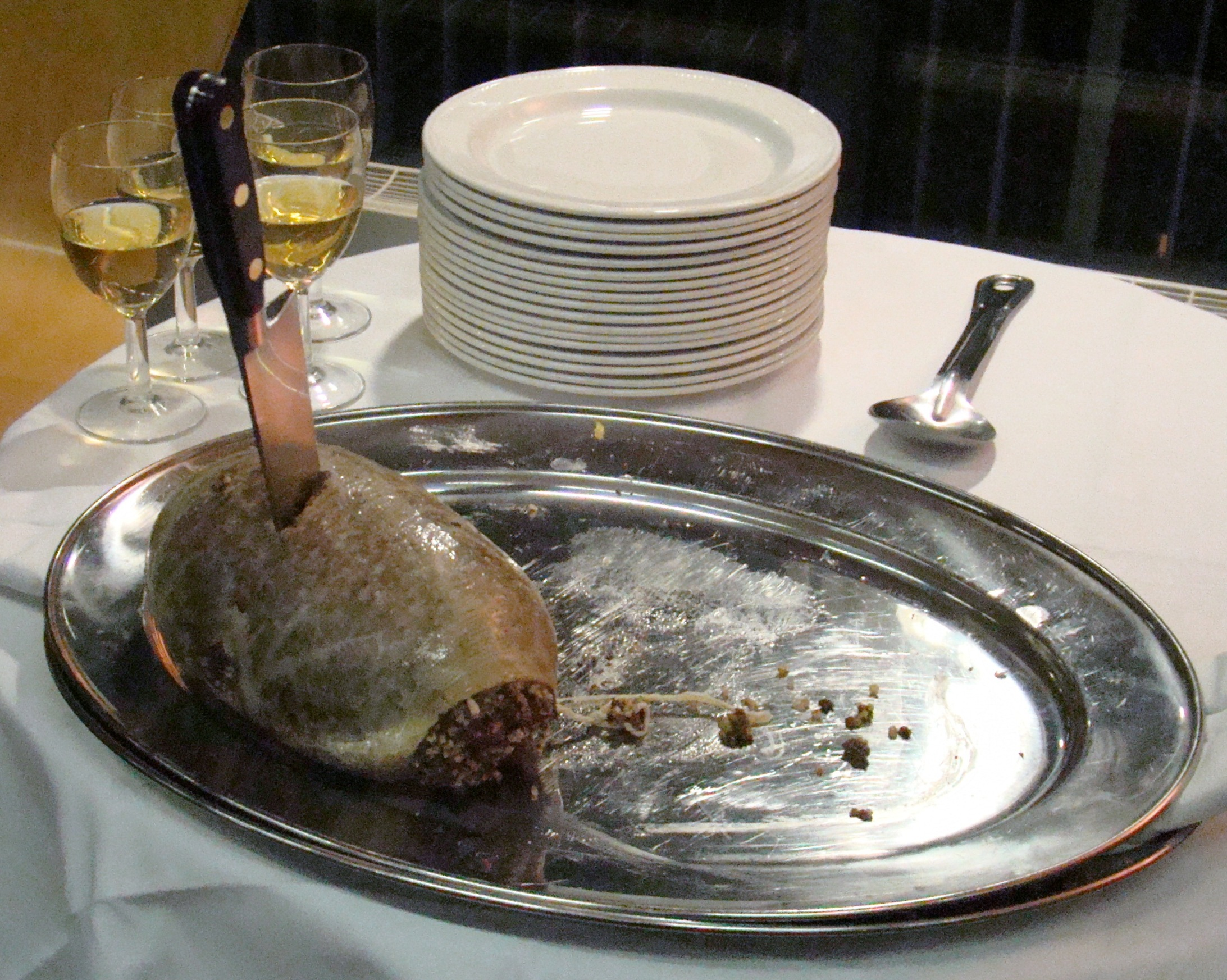
Haggis on a platter at a Burns supper

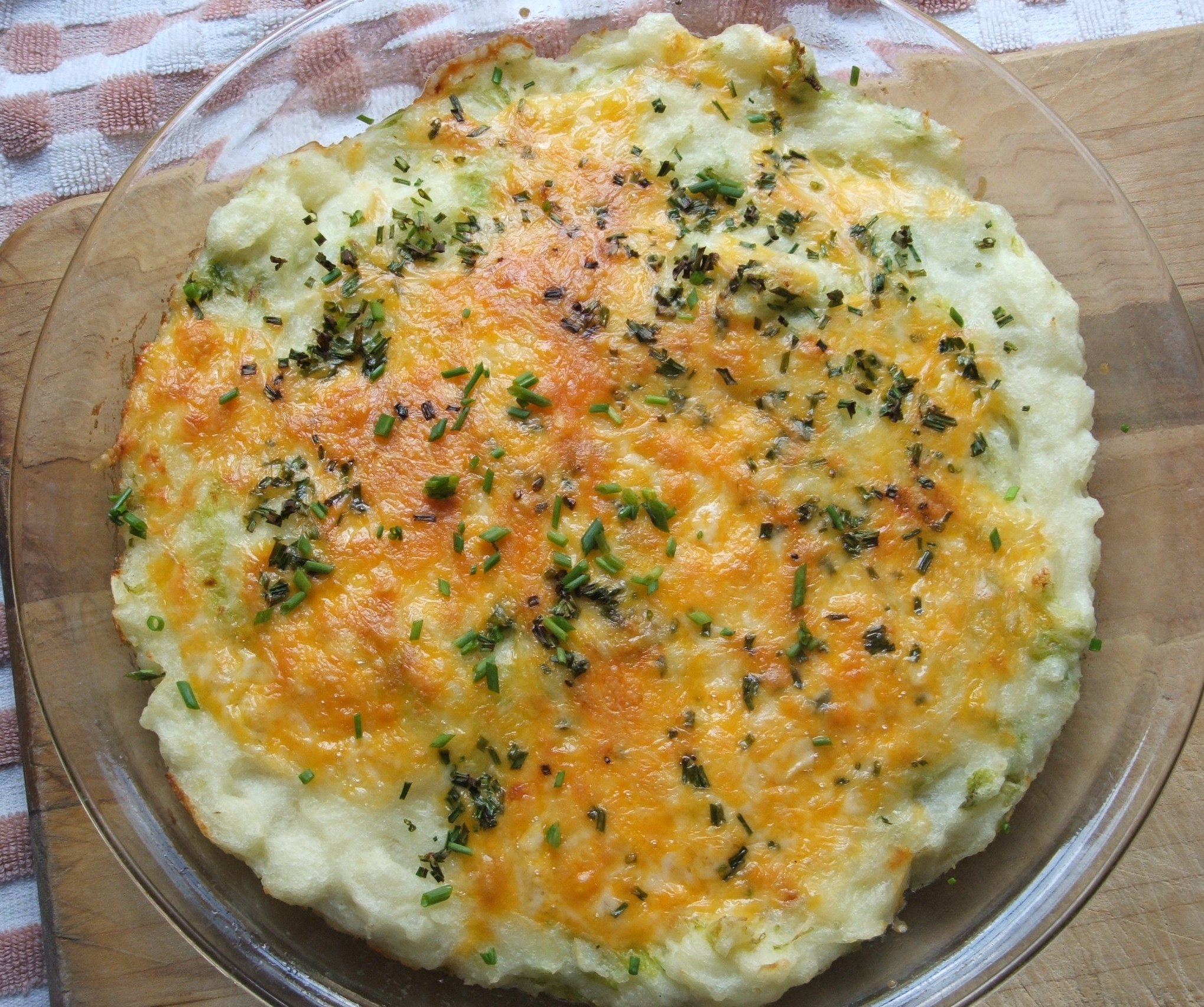
A dish from the Scottish Borders, rumbledethumps

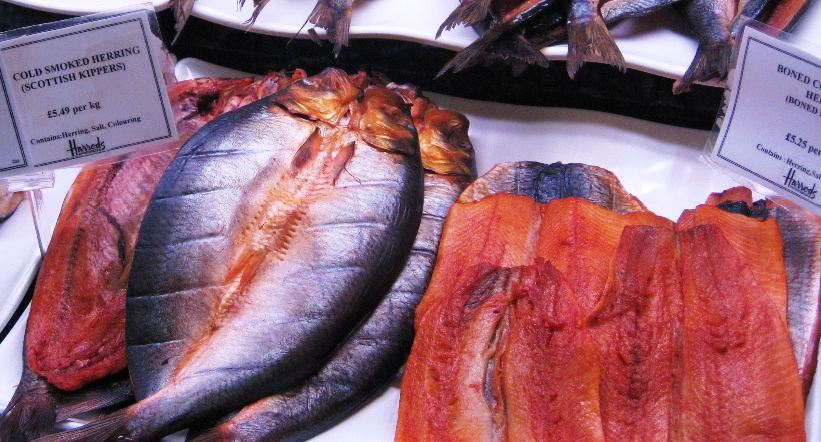
Scottish kippers, for sale in Harrods

== Drinks ==
=== Alcoholic ===
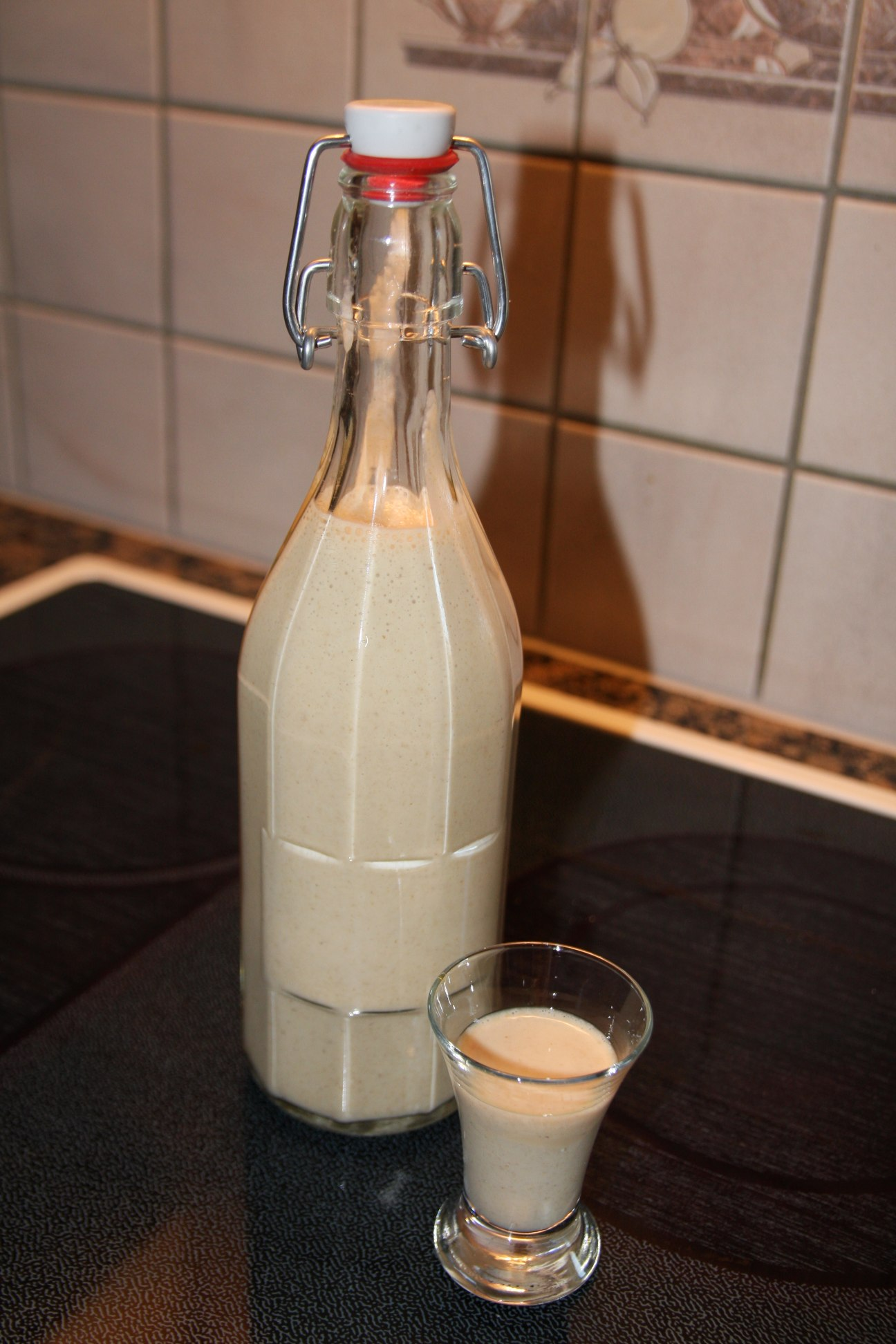
Atholl brose

- 90 shilling ale, 80 shilling ale, 70 shilling ale
- India pale ale
- Atholl Brose, a cocktail prepared using oatmeal brose, honey, whisky, and sometimes cream (particularly on festive occasions)
- Crabbie's
- Drambuie
- Ginger wine
- Het pint, hot spiced ale to which sugar, eggs and spirits may be added
- Heather ale, flavoured with young heather tops
- Scotch ale
- Scotch mist, a cocktail containing mainly Scotch whisky
- Scotch whisky
- Tennent’s Lager

=== Non-alcoholic ===
- Breakfast tea
- Irn-Bru, a bright orange carbonated soft drink
- Red Kola, a bright red carbonated soft drink
- Sugarelly

== Chefs ==
- William Curley
- Andrew Fairlie
- Mark Greenaway
- Tom Kitchin
- Tom Lewis
- Gary Maclean
- Angela Malik
- James Morton
- Alan Murchison
- Nick Nairn
- Gordon Ramsay
- Tony Singh

== See also ==
- List of British desserts
- List of restaurants in Scotland
- Food and the Scottish royal household
