= Crab soup =

Crab soup may refer to:

- Cream of crab soup- Maryland soup with milk/half and half and crab meat.
- She-crab soup- South Carolina soup with crab roe, milk/cream, and crab meat.
- Maryland crab soup- made with tomatoes, corn, vegetables, and crab meat
