= Edinburgh Castle Rock =

Edinburgh Castle Rock may refer to:

- Edinburgh Castle sits on a volcanic plug called Castle Rock
- Edinburgh rock, a Scottish confection sometimes known as Edinburgh Castle Rock
