= Anna Liberata de Souza =

19th century storyteller and maid

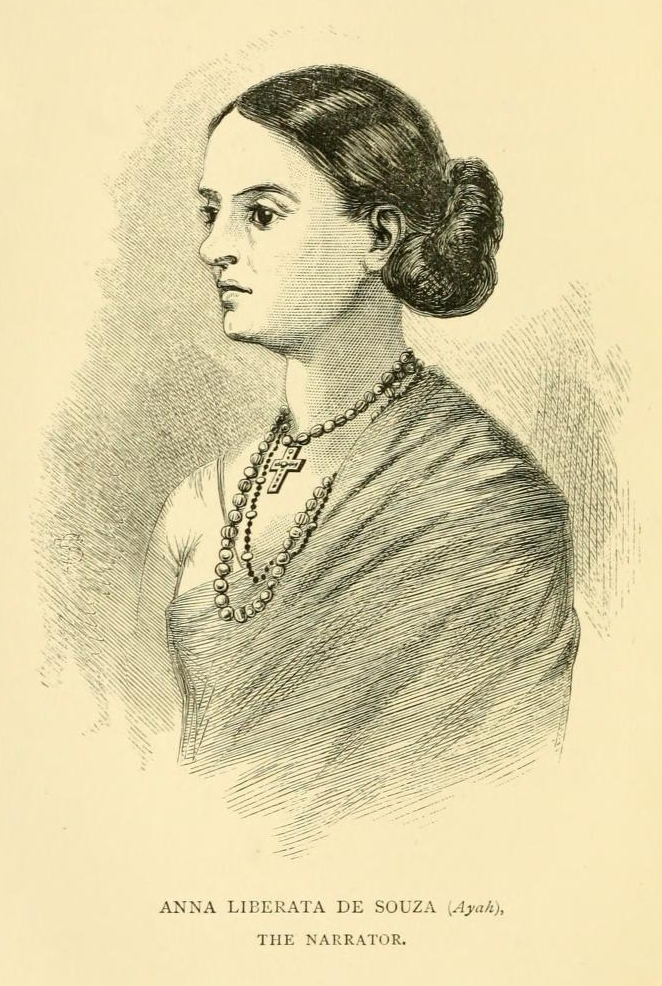
- Occupation: Maid
- Known for: Narrator of Indian Folktales
- Notable work: Narrator of Old Deccan Days

Anna Liberata de Souza (born c. 1819–1823) was the Indian maid of the Anglo-Indian writer Mary Frere. The stories she told were the basis for Frere's book Old Deccan Days or Hindoo Fairy Legends, Current in Southern India, Collected From Oral Tradition.

== Early life ==
De Souza's grandfather's family belonged to the Lingayat caste. They were originally from Calicut (today also known as Kozhikode). They later moved near Goa. During this time her grandfather, along with his family, converted to Christianity and, as a result, his father broke all ties. Her grandfather was a havildar and her father a tent pitcher in the British army. Both won medals.

De Souza had seven brothers and one sister, none of whom attended school. Their mother often worked as a coolie, and therefore their grandmother used to take care of them. She was a Christian but still respected Hindu temples. It is from her that de Souza and her siblings heard the stories and Hindu fairy legends that she later narrated to Mary Frere.

== Life with Mary Frere ==
In 1865–66, Frere accompanied her father on a three-month tour through the Bombay Presidency of India, where he was the governor. Her mother was in England and not accompany them. Frere and de Souza were the only females in the group. De Souza narrated the stories to Frere in English, and Frere later wrote them down. Afterwards, she read them to de Souza to check for accuracy.

== Old Deccan Days ==
Old Deccan Days was published in London and was later translated into many languages. The book was illustrated by Mary Frere's sister, the artist Catherine Frances Frere. Orientalist Max Müller noted that one of the stories sounded like it had been translated directly from the original Sanskrit.
