= Partan bree =

Scottish soup dish

- Type: Soup
- Place of origin: Scotland
- Main ingredients: Crab, rice, stock, milk or cream

Partan bree (transl. crab soup) is a seafood soup speciality from north-eastern Scotland, where much of the country's fishing fleet is based. Its name derives from its ingredients, partan being the Gaelic and Scots for the edible crab, and bree a Scots term for soup (lit. brew). Crab and rice are used as main ingredients.

Partan bree was first documented in 1909 in The Cookery book of Lady Clark of Tillypronie.

== See also ==
- She-crab soup
- List of soups
