= Tattie scone =

Scottish potato dish

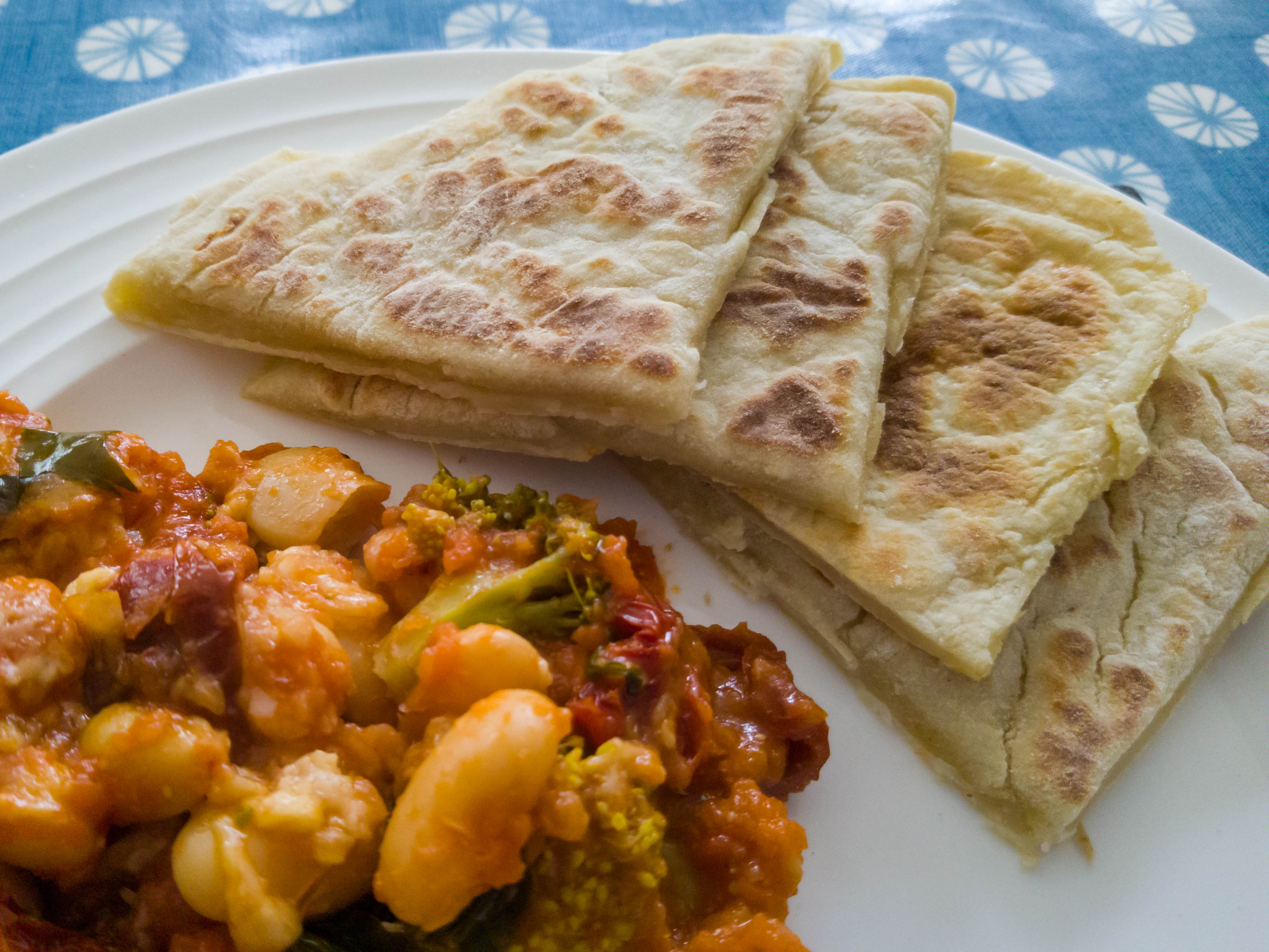
- Tattie scones with a vegetable stew
- Alternative names: Potato scone
- Type: Griddle scone
- Place of origin: Scotland
- Main ingredients: Potatoes, salt

A tattie scone (tottie scone) or potato scone is a regional variant of the savoury griddle scone which is especially popular in Scotland. Many variations of the recipe exist. They generally include liberal quantities of boiled potatoes, butter and salt.

== Preparation ==
A typical tattie scone is made with mashed potato (potato and butter—no milk is used—with salt to taste) and plain flour is added to make it into a dough which is then rolled out and put on a griddle (Scots: girdle) to cook. Tattie scones contain a small proportion of flour to a large proportion of potatoes: one traditional recipe calls for two ounces of flour and half an ounce of butter to a pound of potatoes.

Looking like very thin pancakes well browned, but soft, not crisp, and come up warm, in a warm napkin folded like a pocket to hold chestnuts. Scones to be triangular shaped, i.e. a round, cut in quarters. If you wish these scones to be good and light, you must boil the potatoes expressly for them and not let them get cold after boiling, but use as soon as passed through a sieve. Add butter, flour, and salt, but no milk, as the moisture of the potatoes is sufficient. Mix up thoroughly; roll out; shape, cut, and bake on the girdle. Turn them once, to cook both sides.

— Lady Clark of Tillypronie, The Cookery Book of Lady Clark of Tillypronie (1909)

== Serving ==
Tattie scones are traditionally made as circles about 6 inches (15 cm) across and then cut into quarters, or farls. They may also be baked in small rounds. They are generally unleavened and thin. They are traditionally served hot, and cold potato scones are often reheated by toasting or frying. They are often served as part of the full Scottish breakfast with fried eggs, bacon and Lorne sausage. Alternatively, they are eaten in a roll, usually accompanied with either Lorne sausage, bacon, or fried egg. They can also be eaten like a wheat scone with jam and a cup of strong tea.

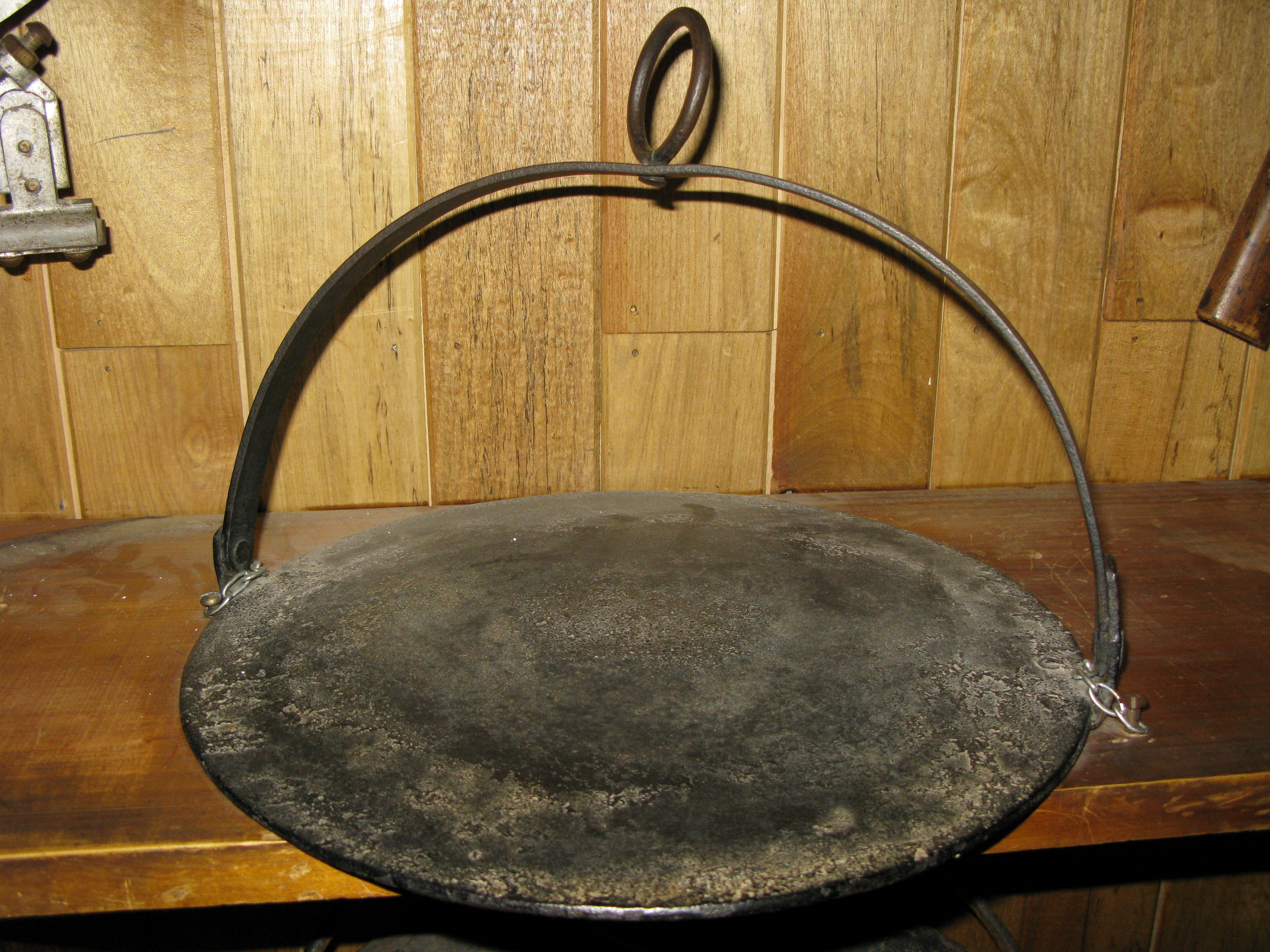
Traditional iron griddle

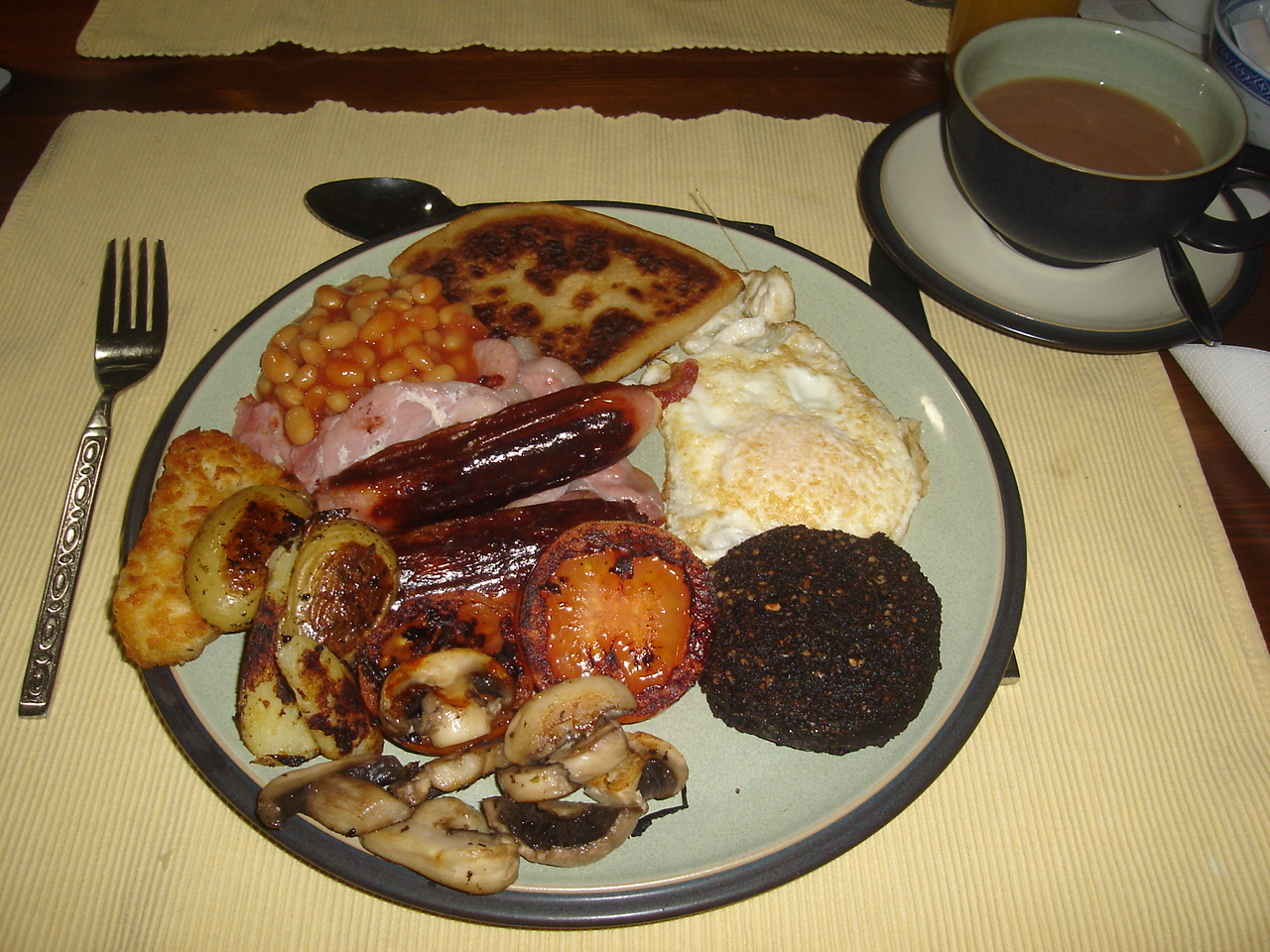
Scottish full breakfast

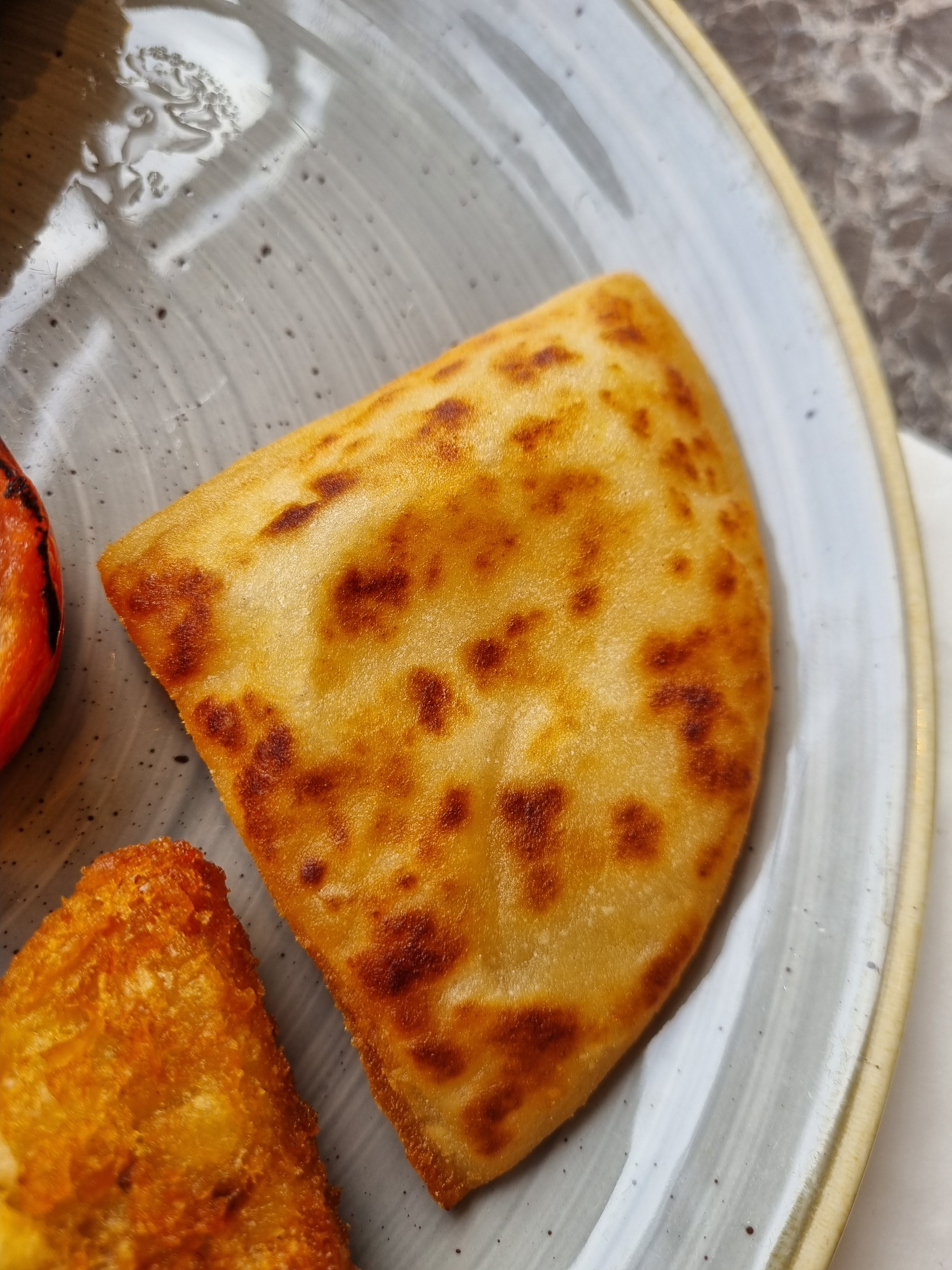
Potato scone in Scotland

== See also ==
- Staffordshire oatcake
- Scone
- List of British breads
- Lancashire potato cake
- Pickert
