= Rock (confectionery) =

Hard stick-shaped boiled sugar confectionery

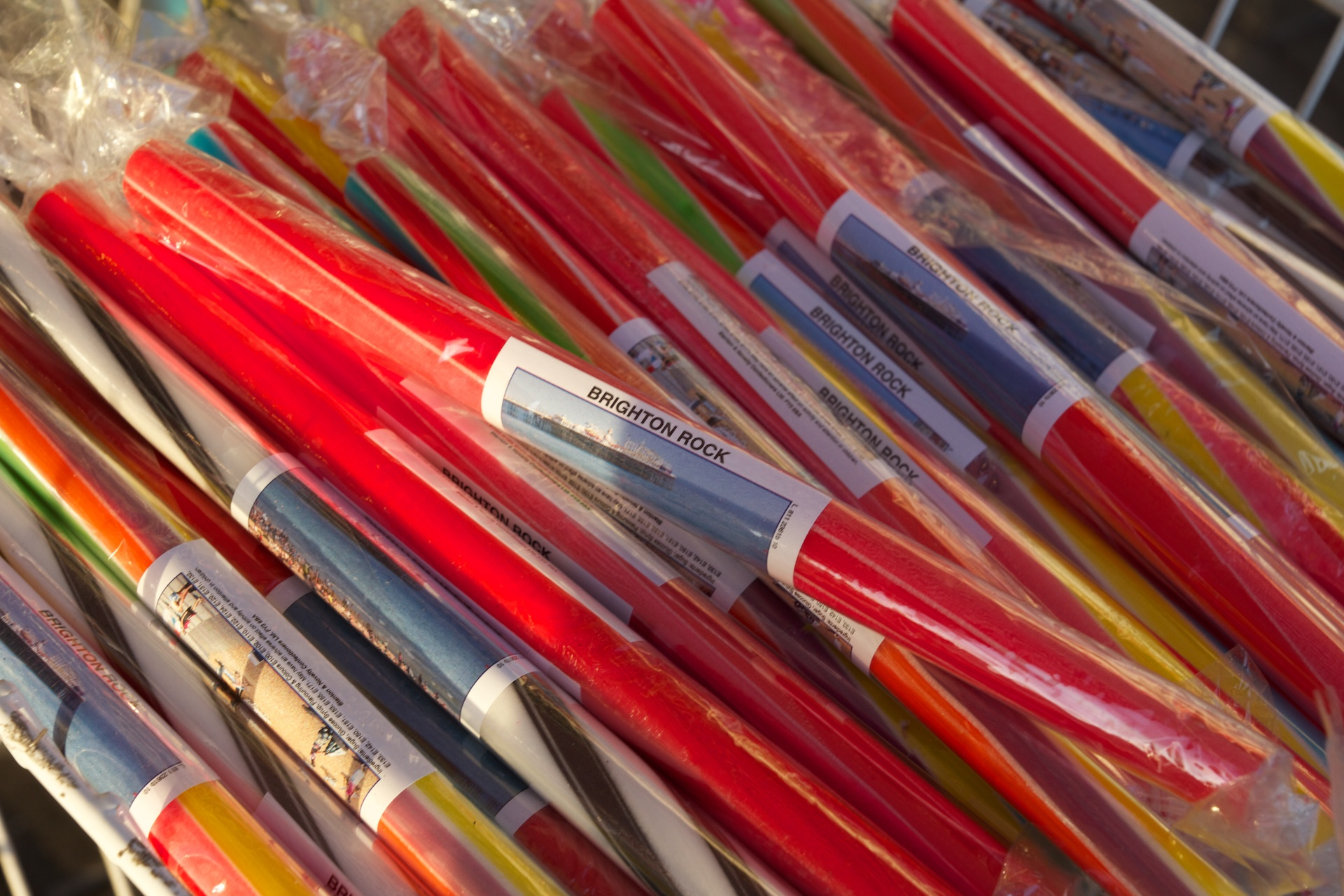
- Traditional sticks of rock
- Type: Confectionery
- Place of origin: United Kingdom
- Main ingredients: Sugar, flavouring (peppermint or spearmint)

Rock (often known by its place of origin, for instance Blackpool rock or Brighton rock) is a type of hard stick-shaped boiled sugar confectionery most usually flavoured with peppermint or spearmint. It is commonly sold at tourist resorts (usually seaside) in the United Kingdom (such as Brighton, Southend-on-Sea, Southport, Scarborough, Llandudno or Blackpool) and Ireland (e.g. Bray, Knock or Strandhill); in Gibraltar; in Denmark in towns such as Løkken and Ebeltoft; and in Sydney and Tasmania, Australia.

It usually takes the form of a cylindrical stick ("a stick of rock"), normally 1–2.5 cm (0.39–0.98 in) in diameter and 20–25 cm (7.9–9.8 in) long. Blackpool rock is usually at least 2.5 cm (0.98 in) in diameter, and can be as thick as 17 cm (6.7 in) across and up to 2 m (6.6 ft) long when made for special retail displays. These cylinders usually have a pattern embedded throughout the length, which is often the name of the resort where the rock is sold, so that the name can be read on both ends of the stick (reversed at one end) and remains legible even after pieces are bitten off. In the 1830s Morecambe became the first town to produce rock with letters running through it. Rock is also manufactured as a promotional item, for example with a company name running through it.

It is sometimes found in the form of individual sweets, with writing or a pattern in the centre; these are, in effect, slices of rock.

== Confection ==
Traditional seaside rock is made using granulated sugar and glucose syrup. The mix is approximately 3:1, i.e. three parts sugar to one part glucose syrup. This is mixed together in a pan with enough water to dissolve the sugar (not enough water will result in burning the sugar or the end product being sugary and possibly "graining off"). This is then boiled to approximately 147 °C (297 °F) or "hard crack" before being poured onto water-cooled steel plates. Once poured, food colourings for the casing and lettering are added and mixed in by hand using a spoon or small palette knife. Once the toffee mixture is poured onto a water-cooled plate, it begins to form a skin underneath; this makes it possible to cut out the colourings, using a pair of shears. The casings and lettering are constantly "turned in" to prevent "chill" (unsightly lumps in the finished product). The remainder of the toffee is stiffened up before going onto a "pulling" machine, a machine that has a fixed arm, and two moving arms, one rotating clockwise, the other anti-clockwise. The pulling machine aerates the toffee, turning it from a solid golden mass into the soft white that forms the centre of the stick of rock. Whilst on the pulling machine, flavourings are added by pouring in measured amounts. A small amount of now white toffee is taken from the pulling machine and used to keep the form of the letters which are made from the coloured toffee.

=== Lettering ===
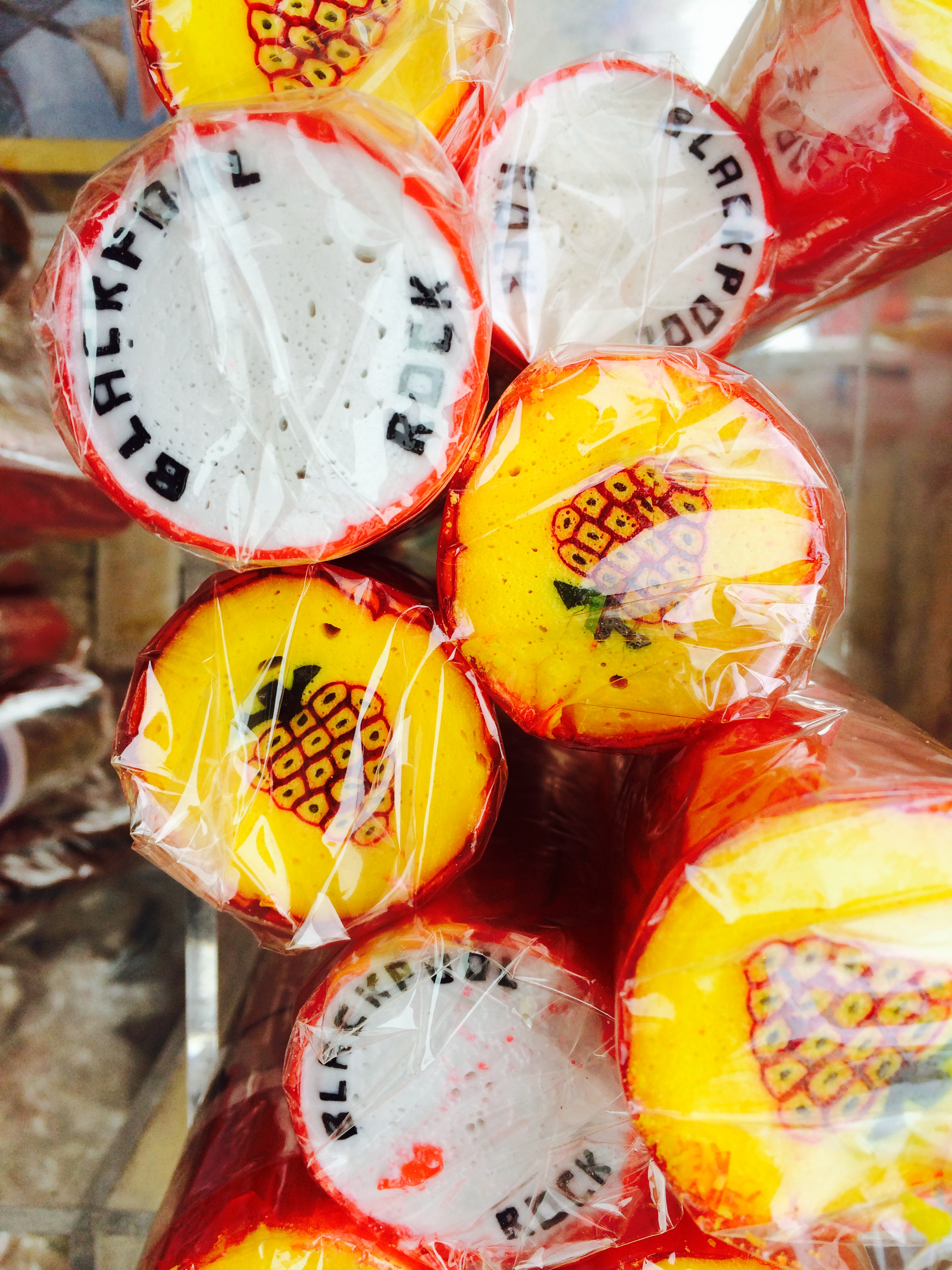
Sticks of rock packaged for sale, with strawberry patterns and "BLACKPOOL ROCK"

Letters are formed by combining thin strips of multi-coloured and white toffee. When they are made, the face of each letter is approximately the size of a thumbprint, not the tiny size seen in the final, stretched product.

The letters are not made in order of appearance in the name (B, L, A, C, K, P, O, O, L) but by their shape; "square" letters, (B, E, F, H, J, K, L, M, N, P, R, T, W, X, Y and Z), are made first, as they will not lose their shape, while "triangle" (A and V) and "round" (C, D, G, O, Q, S, U) letters are made last to prevent them from losing their shape, as the toffee is still reasonably soft at this point. For example, the letters that make up "BLACKPOOL ROCK" may be made in this order: B, P, R, K(×2), L(×2), A, C(×2) and O(×3). The individual letters are placed between blocks or sticks at this point, to prevent them from losing shape and going flat. The letters are then placed in their correct spelling order with a "strip" of white, aerated toffee between each letter to make it readable.

Capital letters are the most common form of lettering as small case lettering is far more complicated, owing to their tails and high backs.

=== Finishing ===
The now aerated white toffee from the pulling machine is divided into three parts; one will form the centre and two will form the "flaps". The flaps are kneaded and spread thinly and evenly before being placed directly onto the letters; these form the space between the casing and letters, and are then wrapped around the stiffened centre. The casing is then kneaded and evenly rolled out, using a rolling pin, and this is then wrapped around the assembled "boiling", which is one very large bar of rock, usually too thick for a person to encircle in their hands, that is still pliable and warm. This is then placed into a "batch roller", which has several tapered rollers and heaters. The rollers keep the boiling of rock round and the heaters keep it just soft enough to work.

A worker known as a sugar boiler then proceeds to "spin out", or stretch, the boiling onto a long flat slab, where rollers make sure it is kept rolling until it has set hard enough to maintain its round shape. The process of spinning out is what turns the very thick boiling into the much longer and much thinner final size. Once set, the strings of toffee are cut to length and wrapped in clear paper with a label, known as a "view" as it usually has a view of a landmark.

The whole process of making lettered rock is done by hand by skilled workers. Smaller sticks of rock, without letters or a "view", can be machine manufactured.

== Other forms of rock ==
Rock is a different product from rock candy; it more closely resembles a harder candy cane.

=== Regional varieties ===
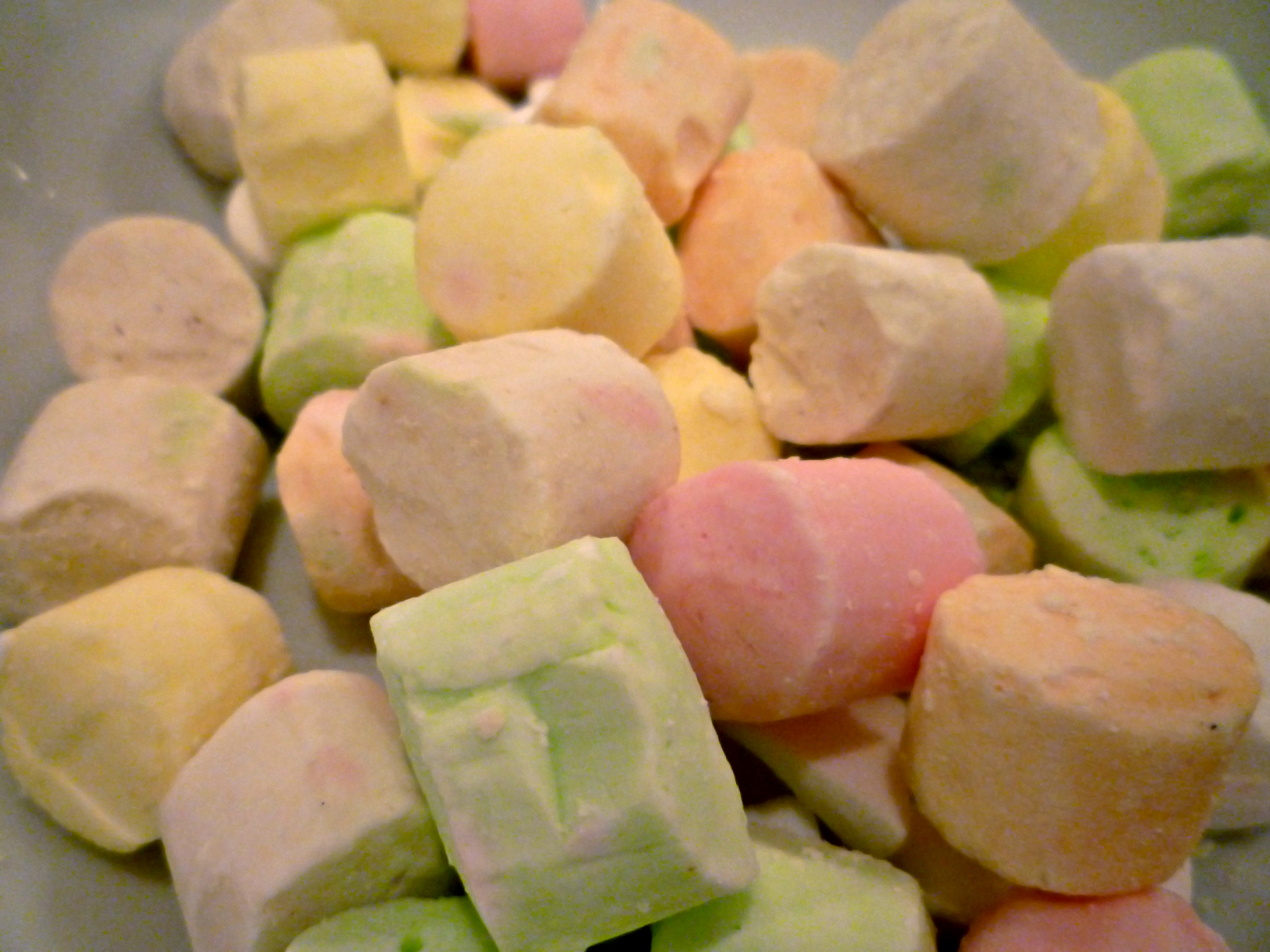
Edinburgh rock

Edinburgh rock is another confection, based on sugar and cream of tartar, made into sticks. It is friable and flavoured, for example, with ginger or lemon.

Another distinctively Scottish form of rock is star rock (also sometimes known as starry rock), or "starrie", which is made in Kirriemuir. It is sold in small bundles of pencil-sized sticks, and is less brittle than seaside rock.

A Dutch type of confection closely resembling rock is the so-called zuurstok (sour stick). Like rock with seaside resorts, the zuurstok is specifically associated with fairgrounds. Its composition is roughly the same as Edinburgh rock but it comes in a different range of flavours, basically with cream of tartar (thus rendering it more or less sour), but also aromatised with cherry, cinnamon or liquorice for example.

A Swedish variety of the candy is called polkagris.

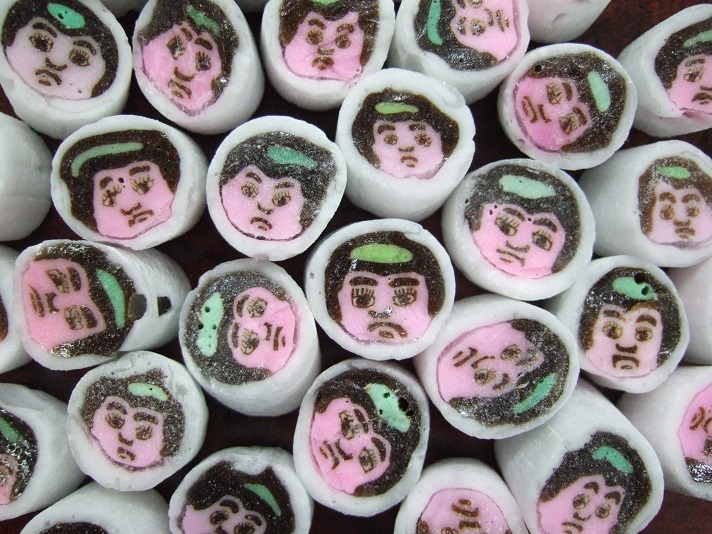
Japanese Kintarō-ame

Japanese Kintarō-ame is made by a similar process.

== See also ==
- Stick candy
- Coltsfoot Rock
- Edinburgh rock
- Escagraph
