= Mary Frere =

English author (1845–1911)

Photographic portrait of a lady, probably Mary Frere, by the royal photographers Walery of 164 Regent Street, London, made between 1888 and 1896. Cory Library.

Mary Eliza Isabella Frere (11 August 1845 – 26 March 1911) was an English author of works regarding India. In 1868, Frere published the first English-language field-collected book of Indian fairy tales, Old Deccan Days.

== Early life ==
Frere was born in 1845 at the rectory of Bitton in Gloucestershire, England. Nicknamed May, she was the eldest of five children of Henry Bartle Frere and his wife Catherine (died 1899) who was the daughter of Lieutenant-General Sir George Arthur, 1st Baronet. Her younger siblings were Catherine, Georgina, Eliza, and Bartle).

Mary's father had served in the colonial administration of Bombay since 1834, and in 1862 he was appointed Governor of Bombay. The family lived in the Parish of St Mary, Wimbledon, where Mary was privately educated. At age 18, she joined him in India, where he served as Governor of Bombay until 1867.

== Published works ==
Frere published several poems and a play. Her most popular work was Old Deccan Days; or, Hindoo Fairy Legends, Current in Southern India. Collected From Oral Tradition, printed in 1868, with illustrations by her sister Catherine Frances Frere. According to Frere's introduction, she began her collection of Indian folklore during long travels with her father. Her only female companion was a local ayah named Anna Liberata de Souza. She was a Christian descendant of the Lingayat caste from the Mahratta country. What started as an idle conversation evolved into a thorough recording and study of Indian culture. German orientologist Max Müller reviewed Frere's collection and wrote that her rendition of Sanskrit originals read like a direct translation of ancient Sanskrit. Frere's father assisted with the editing of the work and wrote an introduction to the first edition of Old Deccan Days. The extensive background and 'Narrator's Narrative' supplied in the work is unusual for the period, placing the tales in the context of the difficult life of the teller. The book was a success; by the time of the third English edition (1881) it was printed in German, Hungarian, Danish, Marathi, Hindi and Gujarati languages. The book was republished with an introduction by Kirin Narayan in 2002.

In the introduction to his 1892 Indian volume of fairy tales, Joseph Jacobs reprinted and acknowledged Frere's contribution to these:

Though Indian fairy tales are the earliest in existence, yet they are also from another point of view the youngest. For it is only about twenty-five years ago that Miss Frere began the modern collection of Indian folk-tales with her charming "Old Deccan Days".

After Lady Clark's death Catherine edited The Cookery Book of Lady Clark of Tillypronie, helping to publish it in 1909 at the invitation of the late author's husband Sir John Forbes Clark. The work was praised by the novelist Virginia Woolf and the cookery writer Elizabeth David.

== Death and commemoration ==
Frere died in 1911 in St Leonards-on-Sea, Sussex, after a long period of ill health. She is buried at Brookwood Cemetery.
