= Cock-a-leekie =

Scottish soup

Cock-a-leekie soup
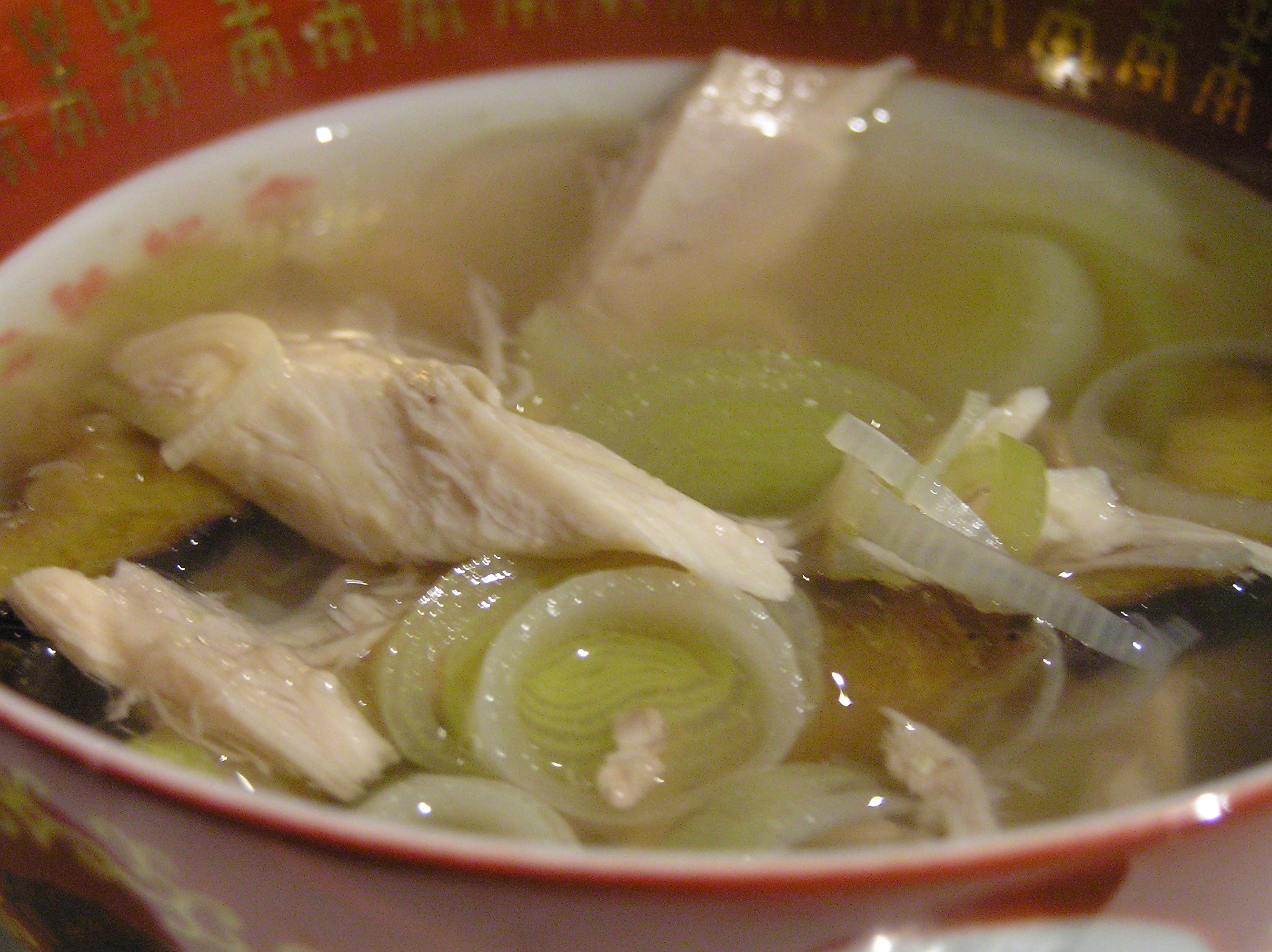
- Type: Soup
- Place of origin: Scotland
- Main ingredients: Leeks, chicken stock, thickener (oatmeal, rice or pearl barley)
- Variations: Prunes, bacon

Cock-a-leekie soup is a Scottish soup dish consisting of leeks and peppered chicken stock, often thickened with rice, or sometimes barley. The original recipe added prunes during cooking, and traditionalists still garnish with a julienne of prunes.

While it is called "Scotland's National Soup", it probably originated as a chicken and onion soup in France. By the late 16th century, it had made its way to Scotland, where the onions were replaced with leeks. The first recipe was printed in 1598, though the name "cock-a-leekie" did not come into use until the 18th century.

== Makeup ==
Traditionally, the soup is made with broiler fowl and would not contain thickeners, or vegetables other than leeks. It would range from a clear stock to a green leek stock, with little flesh. The original cock a leekie is delicate and refreshing and difficult to make flavoursome whereas the more appetizing modern version which has more chicken, vegetable and thickener is closer to chicken soup or stew.

Cock a leekie soup, a chicken and leek consommé with a little flesh and pieces of leek, is a traditional course at Burns’ Suppers.

There are vegetarian versions which has leeks and may include mixed vegetables, chicken flavoured meat substitute and/or prunes.

== History ==
The first known mention of this soup is from the Orchtertyre House Book (1737), an accounts book that recorded a dinner of 'cockie leekie fowlls in it'". The earliest recipe is from the Victorian era cookbook writer Isabella Beeton, and is thickened with "the fine part of oatmeal". Christian Isobel Johnstone (Meg Dods) said the soup "must be very thick of leeks and the first part of them must be boiled down into the soup until it becomes a lubricious compound". "Cockie Leekie" was an offering on the 1st Class passenger luncheon menu of the RMS Titanic on 14 April 1912, the day the vessel struck an iceberg.

== See also ==
- Chicken soup
- Haggis
- List of soups
- Scotch broth
