= Berwick cockle =

British confectionary

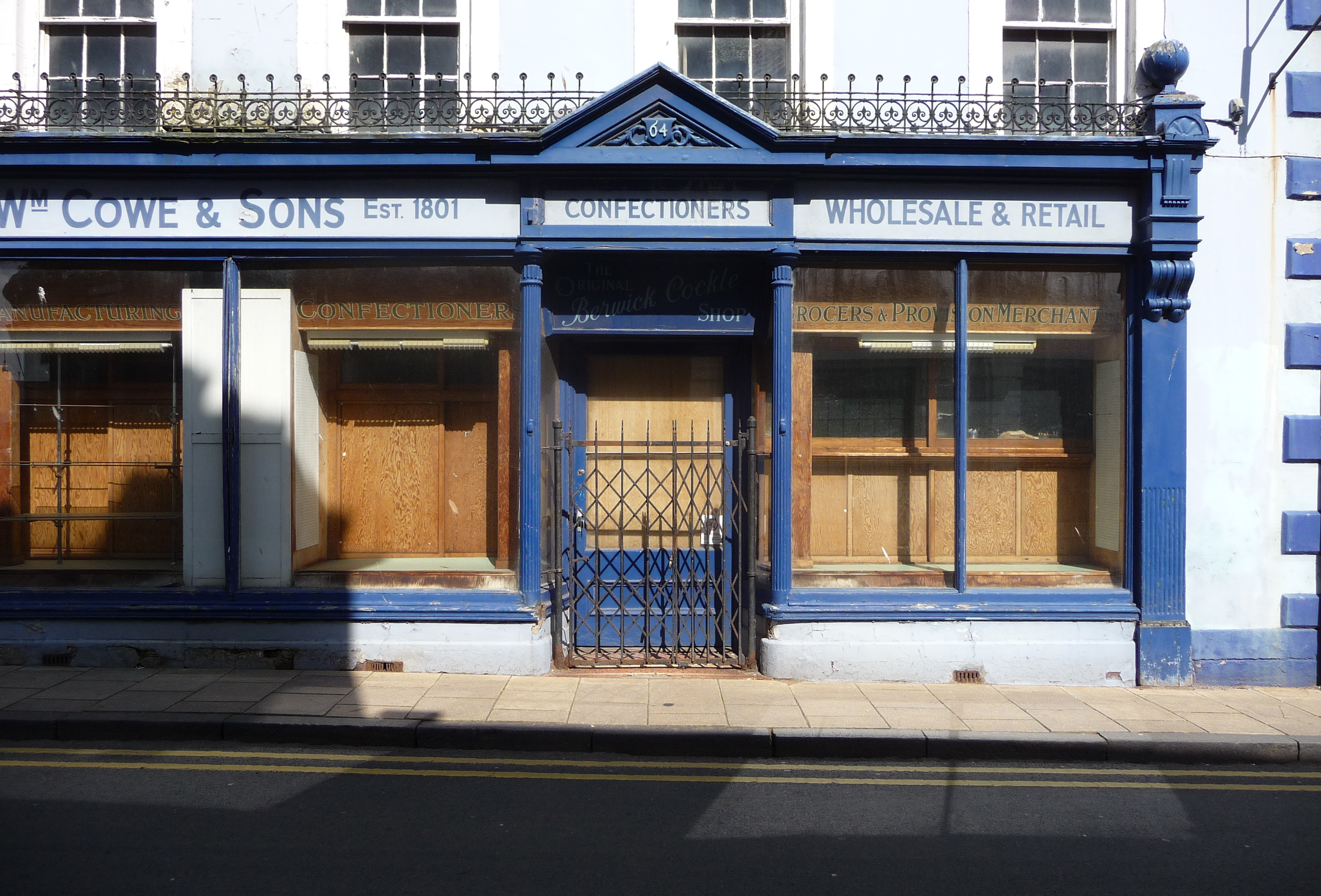
- William Cowe & Sons storefront
- Type: Confectionery
- Place of origin: England
- Region or state: Northumberland
- Associated cuisine: English, Scottish
- Invented: 1801

A Berwick cockle is a white-coloured sweet with red stripes, originally associated with Berwick-upon-Tweed. Cockles have been made since 1801. Their moulding process gives them a flattened shape with an equatorial rib. They are sold loose by weight in paper bags, traditionally in "quarters"—a quarter of a pound. They were originally made and sold in Berwick by the Cowe family until their shop closed in 2010. The current version is described by internet vendors as a "crumbly" mint, while the original Cowe product was a hard mint.
