= Haggis pakora =

Scottish snack food of haggis ingredients prepared as pakoras

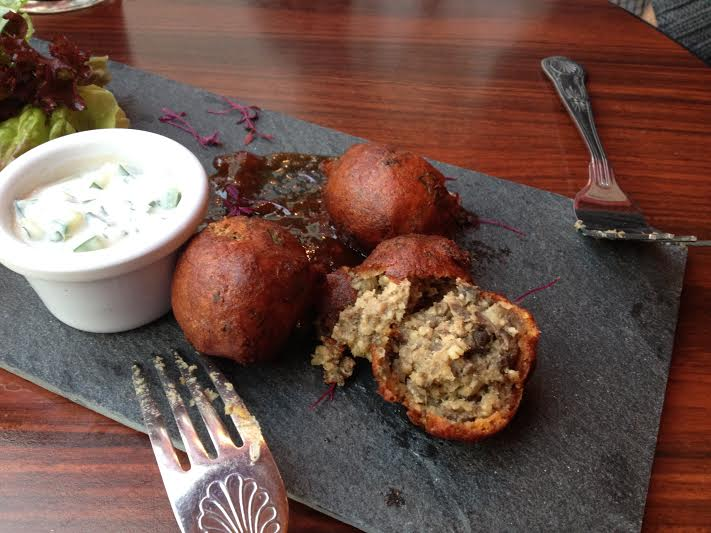
- A Haggis pakora served in a Kirkcudbright hotel restaurant, September 2013
- Course: Hors d'oeuvre or snack
- Place of origin: Scotland
- Region or state: Glasgow
- Associated cuisine: Scottish, South Asian
- Serving temperature: Hot
- Main ingredients: Sheep's heart, liver and lungs, onion, oatmeal, suet, yogurt, gram flour, spices
- Variations: Vegetarian haggis pakora
- Food energy (per serving): 159 (Note: Calories for a prepared brand, consisting of protein 16.4g, carbohydrates 17.5g, fat 2.1g.) kcal (670 kJ)

Haggis pakora is a Scottish snack food that combines traditional Scottish haggis ingredients with the spices, batter and preparation method of pakora from the Indian subcontinent. It has become a popular food in Indian and Pakistani restaurants in Scotland, and is also available in prepared form in supermarkets.

== Origins ==
Haggis pakora has been described as a "highly improbable Indo-Caledonian alliance making use of the Scots' most potent culinary weapons: sheep pluck (heart, liver and lungs) and deep-fat frying." It has more fondly been called "an inspired example of Indo-Gael fusion". Haggis pakoras are just one of the many haggis fusion foods that have arisen in recent years. Others include haggis samosas, haggis spring rolls, haggis lasagna and haggis quesadillas. (Note: A haggis, neeps and tatties pasty was submitted for the 2016 World Pasty Championships.) Often these use vegetarian haggis rather than the traditional haggis made from a sheep's stomach stuffed with the chopped up lung, heart and liver of the sheep mixed with oatmeal.

The dish appears to have been the creation of the Sikh community during a Scottish Melā held at the SEC in 1992–93, where, with collaboration with the Exec. Chef at the time Bill McMeekin, he was asked for ideas on how to combine Scottish produce and Indian culinary influences. During some practical experiments, it was found that haggis could be used in the same way as other pakora ingredients. Haggis pakoras have become popular appetizers in Indian restaurants in Scotland, where they appeal to what English food writer Felicity Cloake described as "the Scottish predilection for deep-frying anything that will stay still long enough to be dunked in batter". In 2013, it was reported that a Greenock meat products company had launched prepared haggis pakoras. The product had won the Best Innovative Product prize at the BPEX (Note: BPEX, the British Pig Executive, is now AHDB Pork, a division of the UK's Agriculture and Horticulture Development Board.) Foodservice Awards 2013. The Scottish celebrity chef Tony Singh served haggis pakora at a pop-up restaurant during the 2015 Edinburgh Festival.

== Preparation ==
The haggis is cooked in its skin in the normal way. The skin is discarded and the contents (meat, oats, etc.) broken up with a fork. The mixture may be spiced with ginger, cumin seeds, coriander seeds, turmeric and garam masala. A thick batter is made of gram flour, chili powder, cumin, salt, yogurt and lemon juice. The meat is shaped into balls, coated with the batter and then deep fried in oil. The pakora is fried for 3–4 minutes, and is ready when the batter is crisp and golden.

Haggis pakoras may be served with a dipping sauce made of chopped tomatoes, ketchup, cayenne, paprika, chili sauce, lemon juice and beef stock. They may also be served with a creamy yogurt sauce. Haggis pakoras may also be made from vegetarian haggis, and may be served with mango chutney in place of the dipping sauce. Another variant places vegetarian haggis inside mushroom caps, which are then battered and fried as before.

== See also ==
- List of deep fried foods
- List of Indian dishes
- List of Pakistani dishes
- Bhaji – Deep-fried fritters served as fast food in India, Pakistan and the Caribbean
- Bread pakora – Indian deep-fried snack
- Vada – Category of savoury fried snacks from India

== Sources ==
- "About AHDB Pork". AHDB Pork.
- "Calories in Mrs Unis Haggis Pakora with a Spicy Chilli Dip 200g Haggis Pakora". NutraTech Ltd.
- Eric Baxter (2013-12-03). "Haggis pakora success boosts Greenock meat firm". Greenock Telegraph.
- Eyewitness Travel (2011-10-03). Ultimate Food Journeys: The World's Best Dishes and Where to Eat Them. DK Publishing. ISBN 978-0-7566-9588-0.
- Felicity Cloake (2014-01-24). "Three amazing alternative haggis recipes for Burns night". The Guardian.
- Geoff Matthews (2015-03-04). "Haggis Pakora: A Fusion of Fear and Food in Glasgow!". Kathleen Matthews.
- Iain Banks (2013-09-30). Raw Spirit. Random House. ISBN 978-1-4481-8343-2.
- Lester Haines (2012-07-06). "Post-pub nosh deathmatch: Haggis pakora v huevos rancheros". The Register.
- McGovern, Kenny (2012-05-17). More Takeaway Secrets: How to Cook More of your Favourite Fast Food at Home. Little, Brown Book Group. ISBN 978-0-7160-2301-2.
- Neil Shaw (5 March 2016), "Pictures as World Pasty Championships are held at Eden Project on St Piran's Day 2016", The Herald (Plymouth)
- Philip Allan (2014). "Haggis Pakora". BBC Good Food.
- Shaheen (2010-01-27). "Mushroom haggis pakoras with curried neep chips". Allotment2Kitchen.
- The Boys Eat Scotland (2015-07-21). "Tony Singh pop up brings Haggis Pakora...and so much more back to Edinburgh for the Festival". Archived from the original on 2016-03-04.
