= Star rock =

Scottish confection

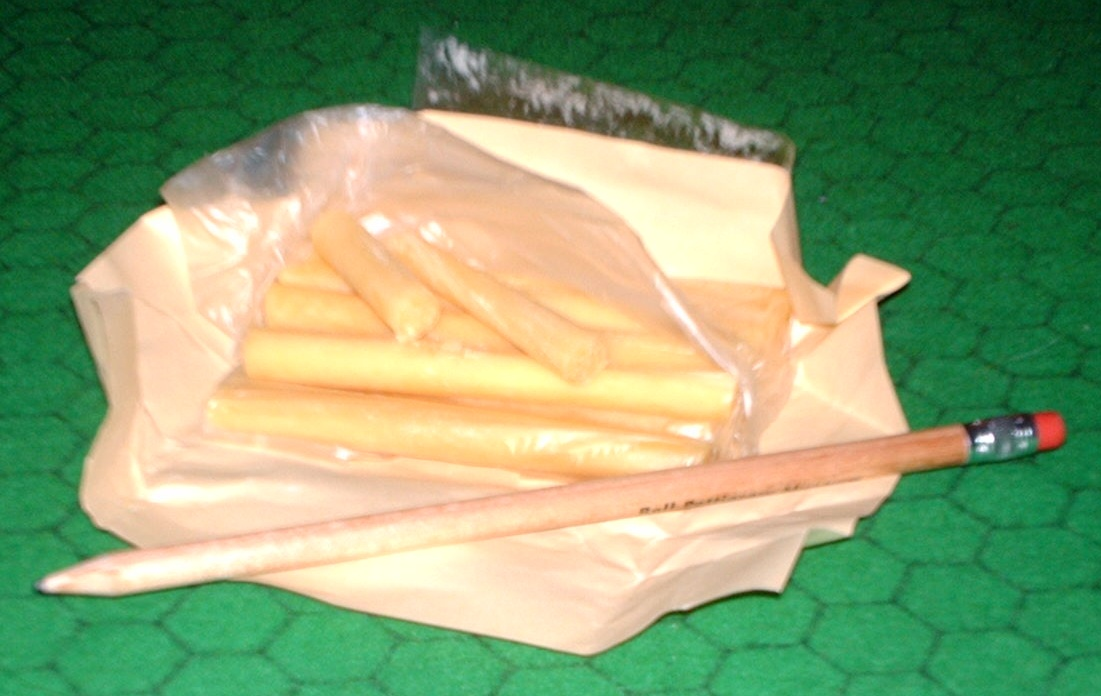
- A bundle of star rock
- Alternative names: Starry rock, starrie
- Type: Confectionery
- Place of origin: Scotland
- Region or state: Angus
- Associated cuisine: Scottish
- Main ingredients: Sugar, golden syrup, margerine, flavouring
- Similar dishes: Edinburgh rock, rock

Star rock is a distinctive Scottish form of confectionery rock. It is also sometimes known as starry rock, or starrie. It is traditionally handmade in Kirriemuir, Angus.

Star rock is less hard and brittle than traditional seaside rock, bearing more resemblance to a particularly hard toffee. Each stick of rock has a diameter similar to a pencil, and it is about 4 inches (10 centimetres) in length. Sticks are not sold individually but packaged in a paper-wrapped bundle. The rock is swirling shades of gold, which reflect its major ingredients: sugar, golden syrup, margarine and flavouring. It has been claimed that these swirls give the rock its name because, in cross-section, they look like a star.

Unlike seaside rock, star rock does not have writing embedded in it.
