= Nick Nairn =

Scottish chef

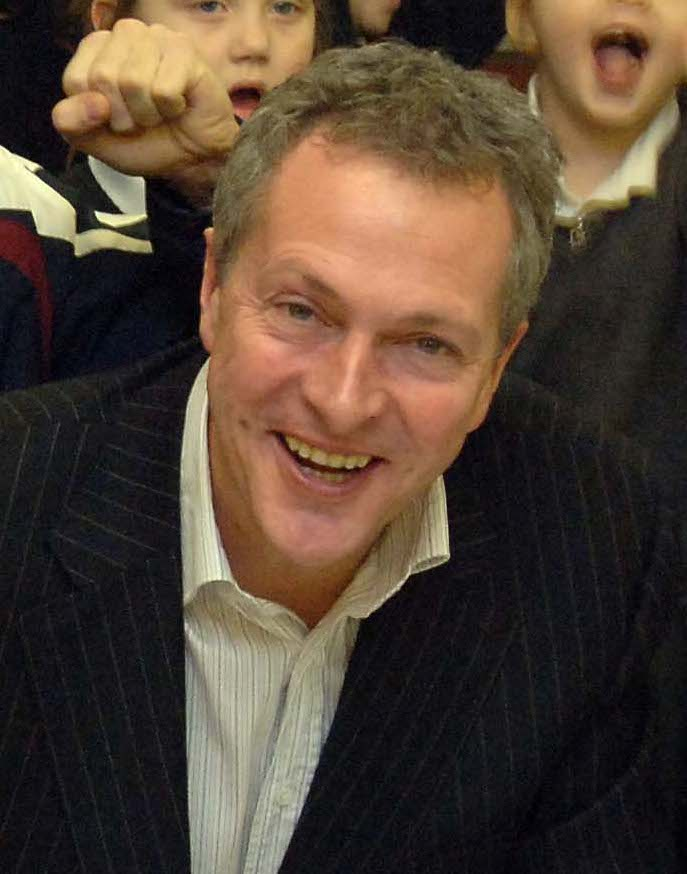
- Born: 12 January 1959 (age 67); Stirling, Scotland
- Culinary career
- Current restaurant: Nick's in Port of Menteith
- Previous restaurant(s): Braeval near Aberfoyle, Nairns in Bridge of Allan
- Television show(s): Ready Steady Cook Great British Menu Taste The Nation Put Your Money Where Your Mouth Is
- Website: https://www.nicknairn.com

Nick Nairn (born 12 January 1959) is a Scottish celebrity chef. He became the youngest Scottish chef to win a Michelin star in the early 1990s.

== Early and personal life ==
Nairn was born in Stirling in January 1959 and grew up in the village of Port of Menteith in Stirlingshire. He attended McLaren High School in Callander before joining the merchant navy at the age of 17 in 1976. He studied at the Glasgow College of Nautical Studies and served in the Merchant Navy until 1983. He now lives in Port of Menteith.

== Career ==
Despite a lack of formal training, he and his first wife opened their first restaurant, The Braeval Old Mill, near Aberfoyle, in 1986. The restaurant won a Michelin star in 1991, making Nairn the second youngest Scottish chef to win a star behind Ross Miller who held one Michelin Star at the Champany Inn at the age of 25.

Nairn went on to open Nairns restaurant in Glasgow in 1998 and a cook school in 2000 at Lake of Menteith. In 2003, he sold his restaurant in Glasgow to concentrate on the cookery school, although he also undertakes a range of corporate work. In 2012 he opened his second cook school, which is located in Aberdeen.

Nairn was a regular chef on BBC's popular Ready Steady Cook from 1995 and presented the Wild Harvest and Island Harvest television programmes in 1996 and 1997. He co-hosted the BBC show "The Great Food Guys" showcasing Scottish food and produce with Dougie Vipond. He has written a number of books and columns for newspapers and magazines and has appeared on a range of television programmes, including a stint as the main presenter on the BBC Scotland programme Landward from 2007 to 2009. In 2008 he defeated Tom Lewis in the Scottish heat of the BBC television series Great British Menu. He went on to cook a main course of roe venison for Queen Elizabeth II and 250 guests at the Mansion House for her official 80th birthday celebration.

Nairn was awarded an honorary doctorate by the University of Stirling in 2007 for his contributions to Scottish cooking and healthy eating campaigns. He was awarded a second honorary doctorate from Abertay University in June 2016.

In December 2017 Nairn was the victim of an assault in Aberdeen.

On the evening of Saturday 28 August 2021, a large fire damaged his restaurant, Nick's, in Bridge of Allan. No casualties were reported.
