= Hatted kit =

Scottish milk dish

- Alternative names: Hattit kit(t)
- Place of origin: Scotland
- Main ingredients: milk, buttermilk, sugar, nutmeg, rennet
- Variations: with cinnamon, cream, wine

Hatted kit, or hattit kit, is a traditional Scottish milk dish. The fresh milk used in the recipe must be warm and traditionally it was made by milking straight from a cow into a pail or other vessel (the kit) containing fresh buttermilk and sometimes rennet. Recipes variously instruct to mix well or to refrain from stirring. More milk was added at the next milking. The resultant "hat" that floats atop the whey is then skimmed off and mixed with sugar, nutmeg or cinnamon and sometimes wine. The hatted kit tends to become more acid, so limewater or charcoal may be added with later use of a batch. It may be served with cream, stewed fruit or with brown bread and salt, instead of butter.
