= Maryland crab soup =

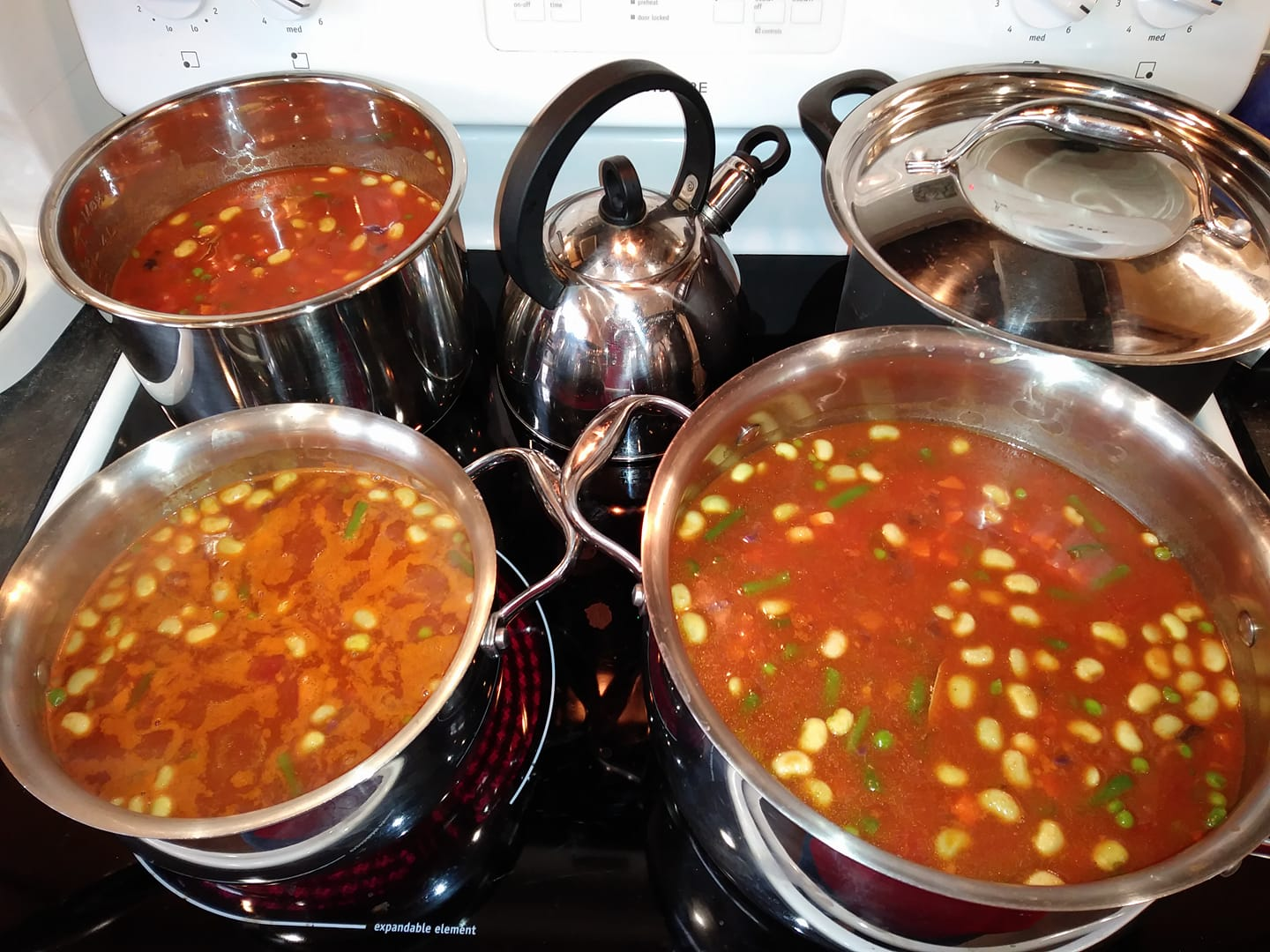
- Place of origin: United States
- Region or state: Maryland
- Serving temperature: Hot
- Main ingredients: Maryland crab meat; Tomatoes; Onion; Potatoes; Old Bay; Corn; Peas; Celery/celery leaves; Fish/shellfish stock or water
- Ingredients generally used: Carrots; Jalapeño; Chili pepper; Green beans
- Similar dishes: Brunswick soup

Maryland crab soup is made with lump Maryland crab meat, tomatoes, corn, potato, cellery or celery leaves, peas, onion, and Old Bay. The main liquid of the soup can be water, shellfish stock, or fish stock. Other seasoning options used include red pepper, bay leaf, thyme, garlic, dry mustard, and/or salt. Different variations may include other additional vegetables such as carrots, green beans, lima beans, jalapeños, or chili peppers. Lemon juice and worcestershire sauce may be added as well.

== Optimal timing and location of ingredients ==
Crab meat from the Chesapeake Bay is preferred due to their sweeter flavor from the brackish bay water and the fat stores they develop for winter that more southerly crab populations lack.

Though served throughout the year, this dish is best served between April and mid-December while crab is in season and vegetables are freshly available. It is a staple at Maryland fall festivals.

== Mixed with cream of crab soup ==
Maryland crab soup is sometimes served in a "half-and-half" style with the Maryland crab soup topped with cream of crab soup. Whether this should be done is somewhat of a debate. Sean Fisher, owner of a Canton restaurant, says "you get the old-school people who don’t believe in it" and Locust Point restaurant owner Billy Hughes calls the mixture "absurd", even refusing to combine the two soups when customers request it. Amanda Bramble, owner of a Cambridge restaurant, respects people's individual tastes but personally thinks "it’s against the crab gods to mix them.”
