= Festy cock =

Scottish alternative to the pancake

A festy cock (alternatively fastyn cock or fitless cock) is a Scottish alternative to the pancake, fired in a kiln to mark Shrove Tuesday. It is made from fine-ground oatmeal mixed with a small amount of water, which is then rolled into a cylinder and baked.
