= She-crab soup =

American crab soup

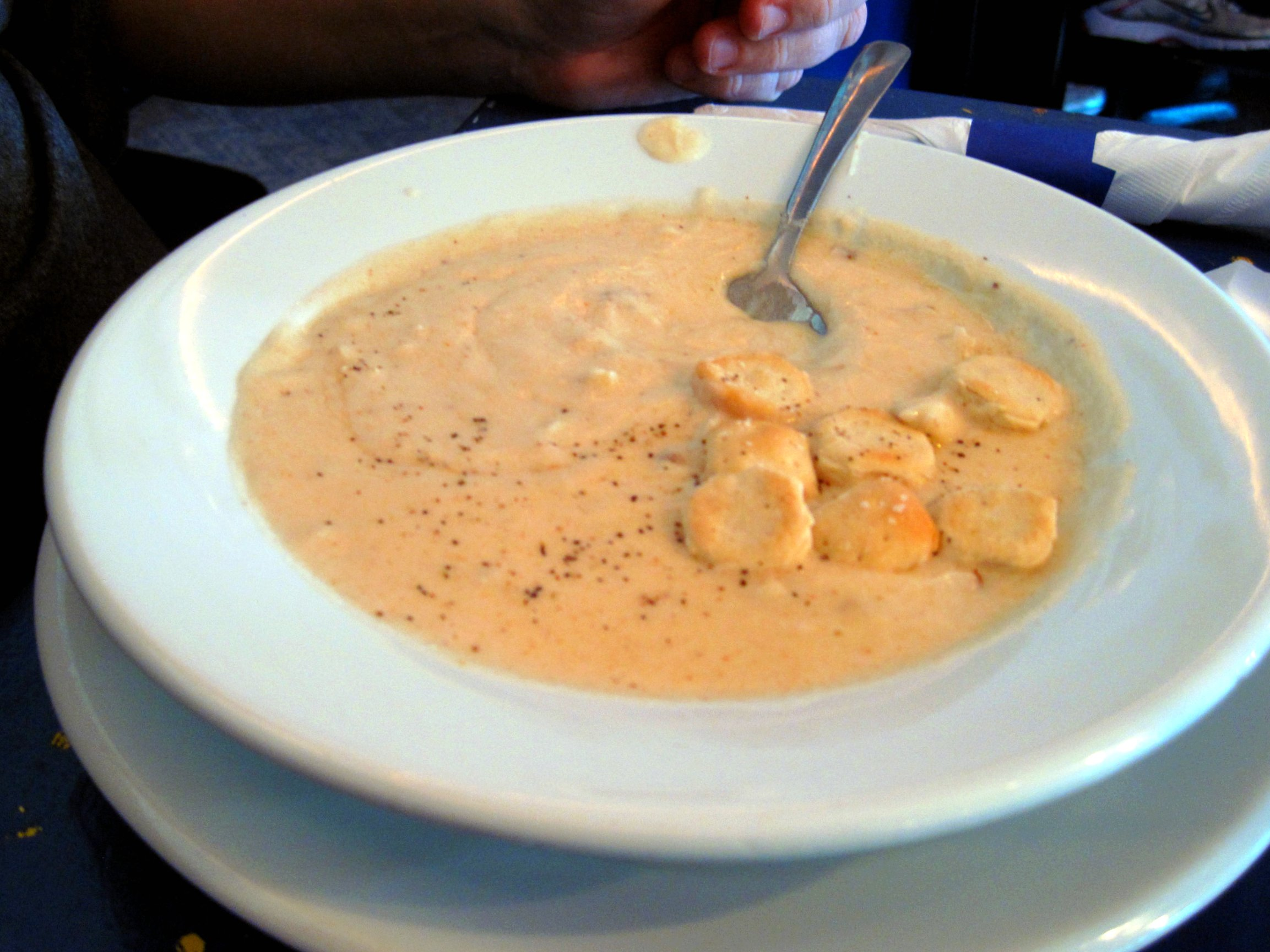
- Type: Soup
- Place of origin: United States
- Region or state: South Carolina
- Main ingredients: Atlantic blue crab meat, crab roe, crab or fish stock, milk or heavy cream, dry sherry
- Similar dishes: Cream of crab soup

She-crab soup is a rich soup, similar to bisque, made of milk or heavy cream, crab or fish stock, Atlantic blue crab meat, and (traditionally) crab roe, and a small amount of dry sherry added as it is plated. It may be thickened either by heat reduction or with a purée of boiled rice; it may also include such seasonings as mace and shallots or onions. The soup is a regional specialty from the South Carolina Lowcountry. It is commonly featured on the menus of many Charleston, South Carolina, and Savannah, Georgia restaurants.

The soup is named for the "she-crab", or female crab, originally a gravid (roe-carrying) crab, as the orange crab roe comprise a chief ingredient in traditional she-crab soup. As with turtle soup, other ingredients may be added to the soup or substituted for others, although crab meat is found in all versions.

Regulations in Maryland and other states restrict the collection of egg-bearing female crabs.

== See also ==
- Partan bree
- List of cream soups
- List of regional dishes of the United States
- List of soups
