= Cream of crab soup =

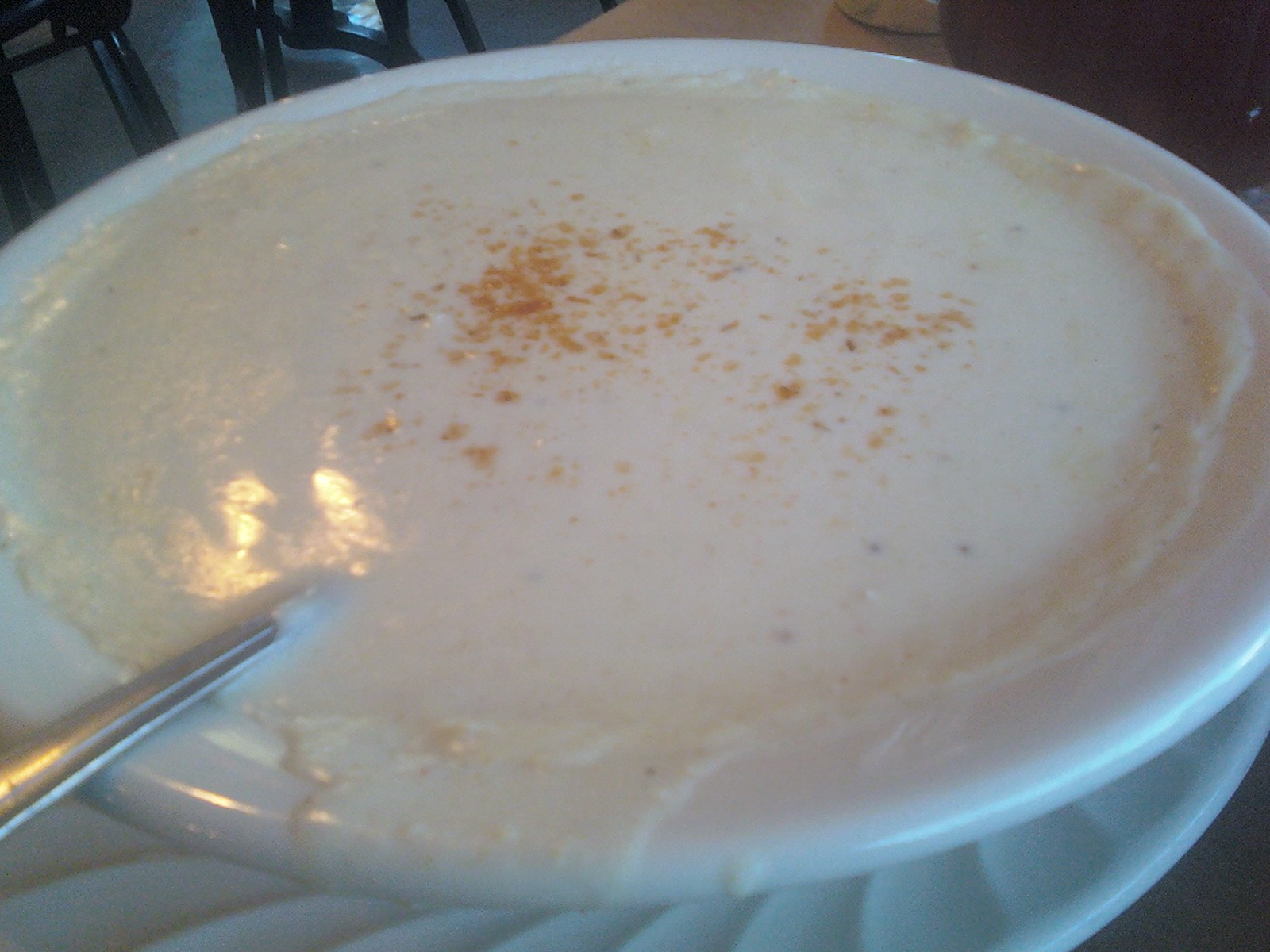
- Place of origin: United States
- Region or state: Maryland
- Serving temperature: Hot
- Main ingredients: Blue crab meat; Onion; Milk and/or half and half; Old Bay; Butter; flour or corn starch
- Ingredients generally used: Sherry; Black pepper; Dill; Lemon; Celery salt; Chicken broth
- Food energy (per 1 cup serving): 130 kcal (540 kJ)
Nutritional value
(per 1 cup serving)
- Protein: 12 g
- Fat: 6 g
- Carbohydrate: 7 g
- Similar dishes: She-crab soup, Maryland crab soup

Cream of crab soup is a dish from the Eastern Shore of Maryland. It is made with lump Maryland blue crab meat, onion, whole milk and/or half and half (milk and cream blend), butter, either flour or corn starch as a thickener, and Old Bay as the main seasoning. Additional flavorings may include dry sherry, dried dill, celery salt, lemon, and black pepper. Some variations include chicken broth as well.

== See also ==
Maryland crab dip

Crab meat
