= Tom Lewis (chef) =

Scottish chef

Tom Lewis is a Scottish chef at the Monachyle Mhor Hotel in Perthshire.

He started his career as a chef in 1995, inspired by well-known chef Nico Ladenis, whom he heard enthusing about food on Desert Island Discs, and David Wilson of the Peat Inn. By the end of 1996, the Monachyle Mhor Hotel had won its first AA Rosette, which has been renewed every year since. Subsequent awards for the chef and hotel restaurant include the Booker Prize Industry Award in 2003, and an Egon Ronay Guide Award in 2005.

Tom Lewis was defeated by Nick Nairn in the Scottish heat of the BBC television series Great British Menu.
