= Edinburgh rock =

Traditional Scottish confection

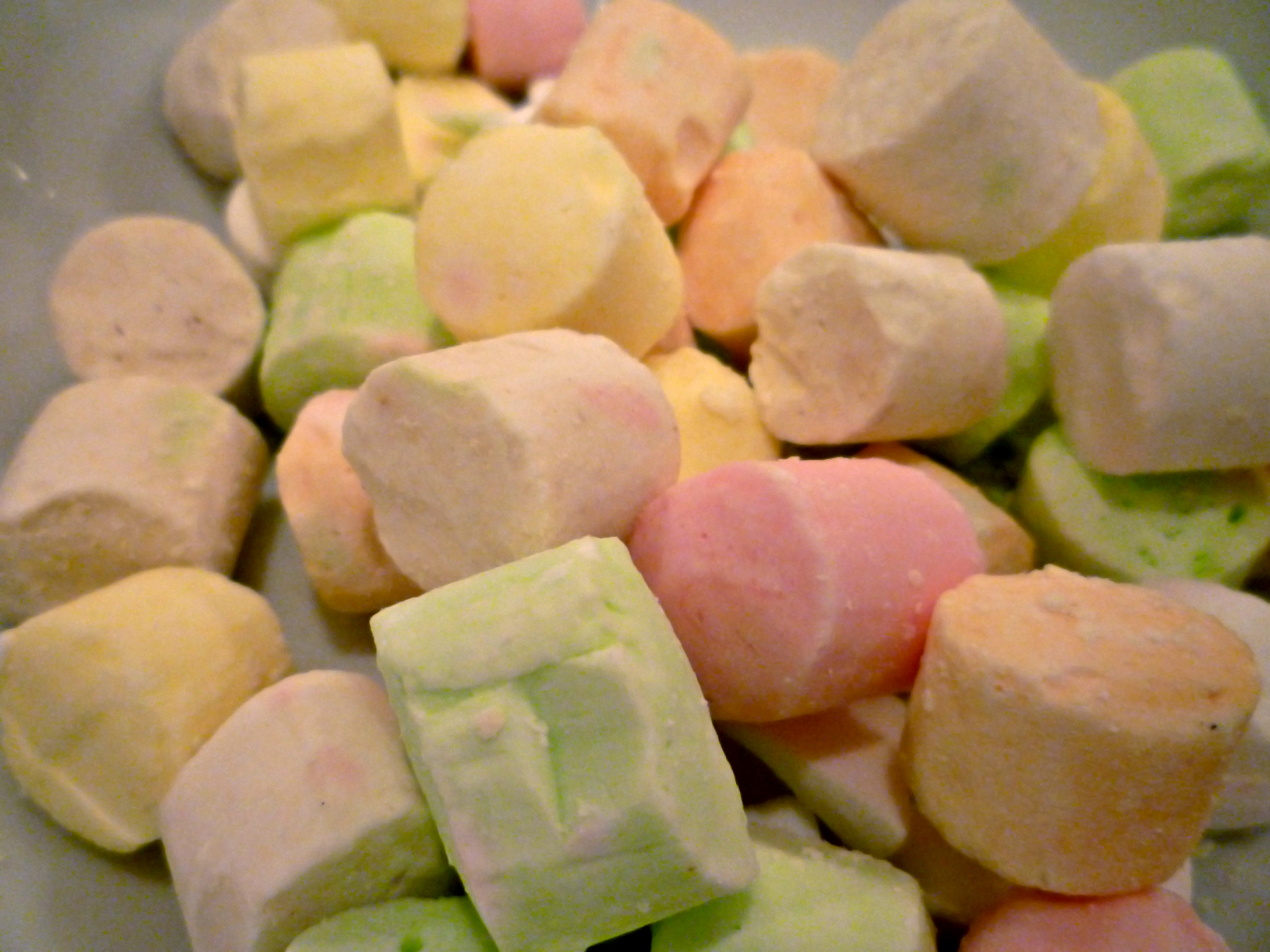
- Alternative names: Edinburgh Castle rock
- Type: Confectionery
- Place of origin: Scotland
- Region or state: Edinburgh
- Created by: Alexander Ferguson
- Main ingredients: Sugar, water, cream of tartar

One brand of Edinburgh rock

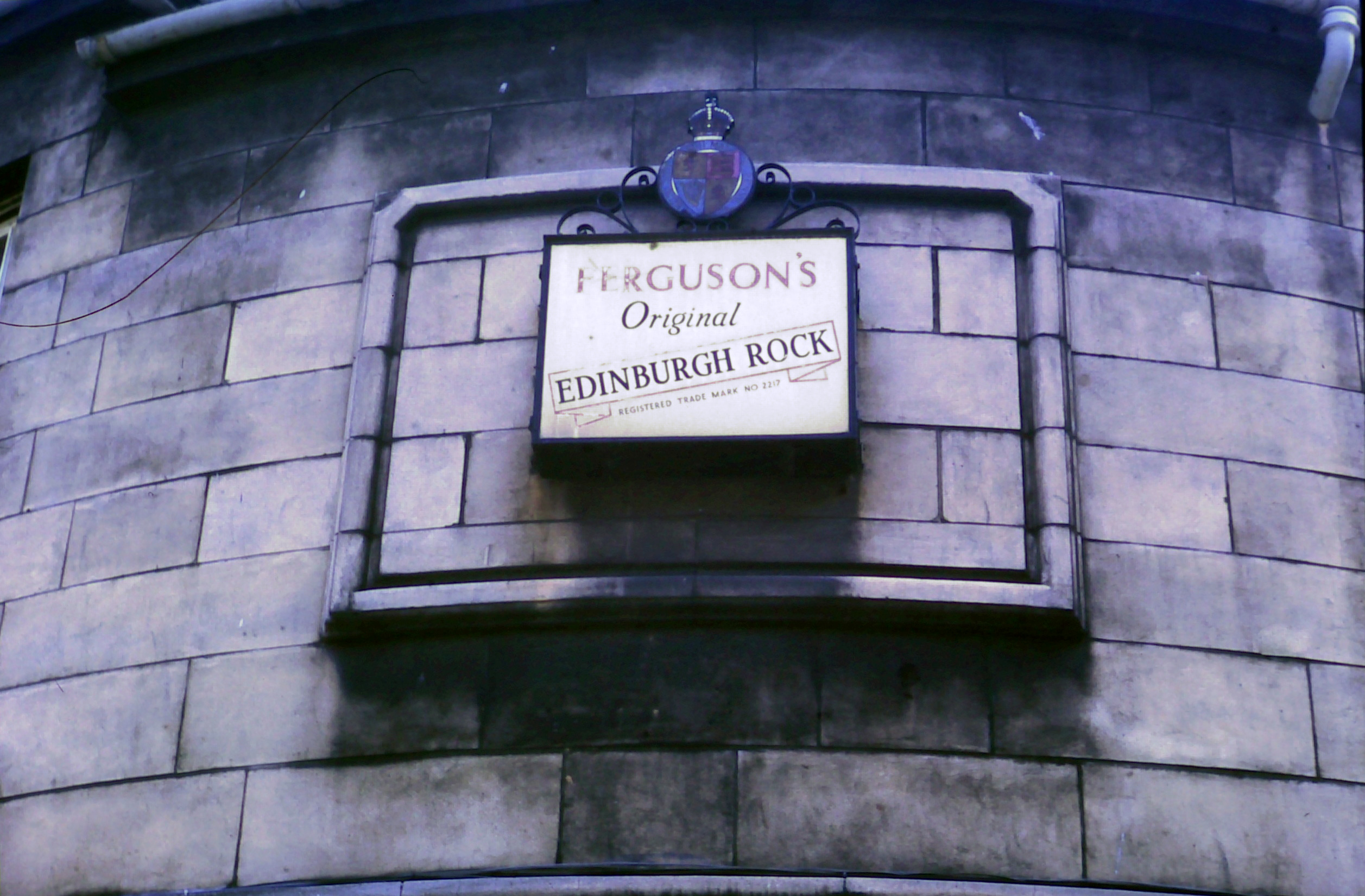
An old Ferguson's 'Edinburgh Rock' advertisement

Edinburgh rock or Edinburgh Castle rock is a traditional Scottish confection, and is quite distinct from conventional rock. It consists of sugar, water, cream of tartar, colourings and flavourings. It is formed into sticks, and has a soft and crumbly texture.

== History ==
Edinburgh rock was first made in the 19th century by a man named Alexander Ferguson, who became known as 'Sweetie Sandy'. Ferguson was born in Doune, Perthshire in 1798. He learned the confectionery trade in Glasgow, and then moved to Edinburgh to set up his own business. The success of Edinburgh rock was such that he was able to retire back to Doune a very rich man.

In the early 20th century, the rock was produced and sold at 1 Melbourne Place (now demolished, but previously the corner of George IV Bridge with the Lawnmarket).

== Discovery ==
There is an apocryphal tale that Ferguson discovered Edinburgh rock by accident. One day he came across a tray of sweets that had lain forgotten for months. He tried a piece of the desiccated results, found it to be delicious, and so Edinburgh rock was born.

== See also ==
- Rock (confectionery)
- Star rock
