= The Cookery Book of Lady Clark of Tillypronie =

Victorian era cookbook by Charlotte, Lady Clark of Tillypronie

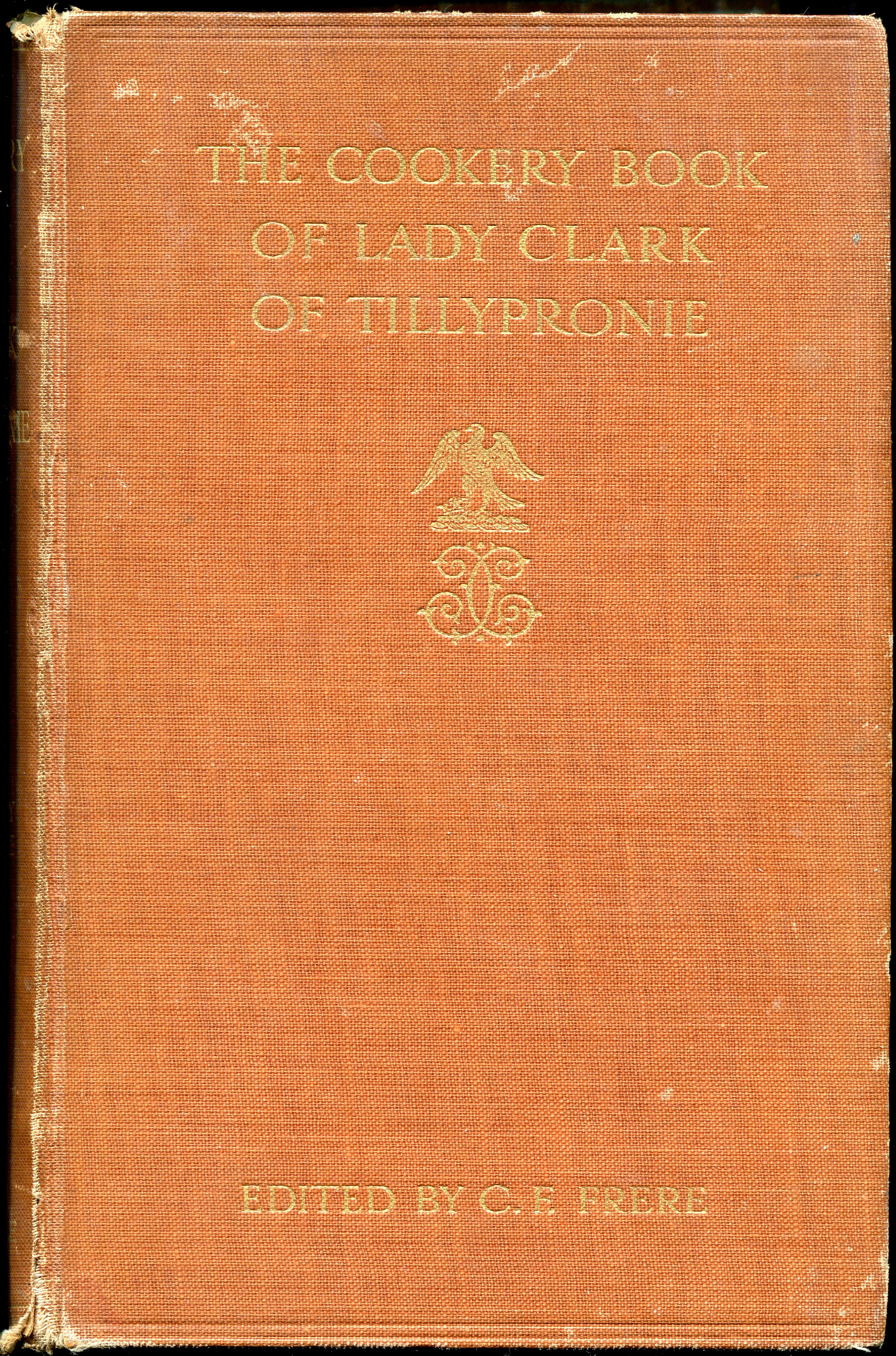
- First edition
- Author: Charlotte, Lady Clark; Catherine Frances Frere
- Subject: 19th century British recipes
- Genre: Cookery
- Publisher: Constable & Company
- Publication date: 1909
- Publication place: Scotland
- Pages: xviii + 584

The Cookery Book of Lady Clark of Tillypronie is a book of recipes collected over a lifetime by Charlotte, Lady Clark of Tillypronie (née Coltman, 1851–1897), and published posthumously in 1909. The earliest recipe was collected in 1841; the last in 1897. The book was edited by the artist Catherine Frances Frere, who had seen two other cookery books through to publication, at the request of Clark's husband.

The book is considered a valuable compilation of Victorian era recipes. Lady Clark obtained the recipes by asking hostesses or cooks, and then testing each one at Tillypronie. She documented each recipe's source with the name of her source, and often also the date. There is comprehensive coverage of plain British cooking, especially of meat and game, but the book has sections on all aspects of contemporary cooking including bread, cakes, eggs, cooking for invalids, jams, pies, sauces, sweets (puddings) and vegetables. She had lived in Italy and France, and the cuisines of these countries are represented by many dishes, as is Anglo-Indian cooking with a section called "Curries".

The book was enjoyed by Virginia Woolf and acted as a source of inspiration to the cookery writer Elizabeth David.

== Context ==
Tillypronie is a Victorian era house between Ballater and Strathdon in Scotland, just east of the Cairngorms National Park, overlooking the valley of the River Dee; the gardens are open to the public. Lady Clark collected thousands of recipes for her own use between 1841 and 1897; among her house-guests in the 1870s was Henry James, who commented in a letter "I bless the old house on the mountain and its genial and bountiful tenants". Lady Clark was married to the diplomat Sir John Forbes Clark, second baronet. Sir John worked in Paris (seeing the 1848 revolution there), moving to Brussels in 1852 and Turin from 1852 to 1855; he married Charlotte in 1851. Living in Europe gave Lady Clark a detailed insight into Italian and French cooking – there are five recipes for Tartare sauce; and she was well informed about Anglo-Indian cookery, with dishes such as "Rabbit Pish-pash". Her approach was to ask her hostess or the cook how any interesting or unusual dish was made, and then to try out the recipe back at Tillypronie to ensure that it worked.

After Lady Clark's death in 1897, her widower invited Catherine Frances Frere (1848–1921), daughter of Sir Henry Bartle Frere, to assemble them into a book, asking her to "stand sponsor" to arrange publication, because she was interested in cuisine, and well-read.

Frere was born in Malcolm Peth, Bombay on 25 September 1848. In later life she lived in Westbourne Terrace, London. The Cookery Book was not Frere's first publication; at the age of 20 she had illustrated her sister Mary's book, Old Deccan Days, Or, Hindoo Fairy Tales Current in Southern India, a compilation of folk tales; their father was at the time Governor of Bombay. The book was popular, going into four editions between first publication in 1868 and 1889. In the Preface to the Cookery Book she denies "the special knowledge of cookery with which Sir John so kindly credits me", but admits she has always been interested in the "study", and that she had seen "two other cookery books through the press for my friend the late Miss Hilda Duckett": these were Hilda's Where is it? of Recipes (1899) and Hilda's Diary of a Cape Housekeeper (1902), both published by Chapman & Hall; but Frere's name had not appeared on their title pages.

== Book ==
=== Structure ===
The first edition is of xviii + 584 pages. It is divided into sections as follows, starting immediately after the Table of Contents with no preamble:

- Baking powder, Barm and Yeast
- Beverages
- Bread, Grissini, Porridge and Rolls
- Cakes, &c.
- Cheeses and cheese dishes
- Confectionery
- Curries
- Domestic Recipes
- Eggs
- Fish
- Fish Pies and Puddings
- Fish, Game, Meat and Savoury Creams
- Game
- Invalid Cookery
- Jams, Jellies, Marmalades, Fruit Syrups, &c.
- Meat
- Meat Jellies
- Meat Pies, Puddings and Soufflés
- Melted Butters, Butter Sauces and Savoury Butters
- Omelets
- Paste and Pastry
- Poultry
- Preserved Fruits
- Roux, Browning and Glaze
- Sauces for Fish
- Sauces for Meat
- Sauces for Poultry and Game
- Sauces for Vegetables
- Soups and Broths
- Stuffings
- Sweet Dishes
- Sweet Puddings
- Sweet Sauces
- Vegetables

There are no illustrations.

There is an Appendix, under Frere's name, with sections summarized from the RSPCA on how "To spare animals unnecessary pain" and "Bad meat" (which gives advice on the best ways to kill rabbits and birds). The index runs to 31 pages in two columns of small type.

=== Approach ===
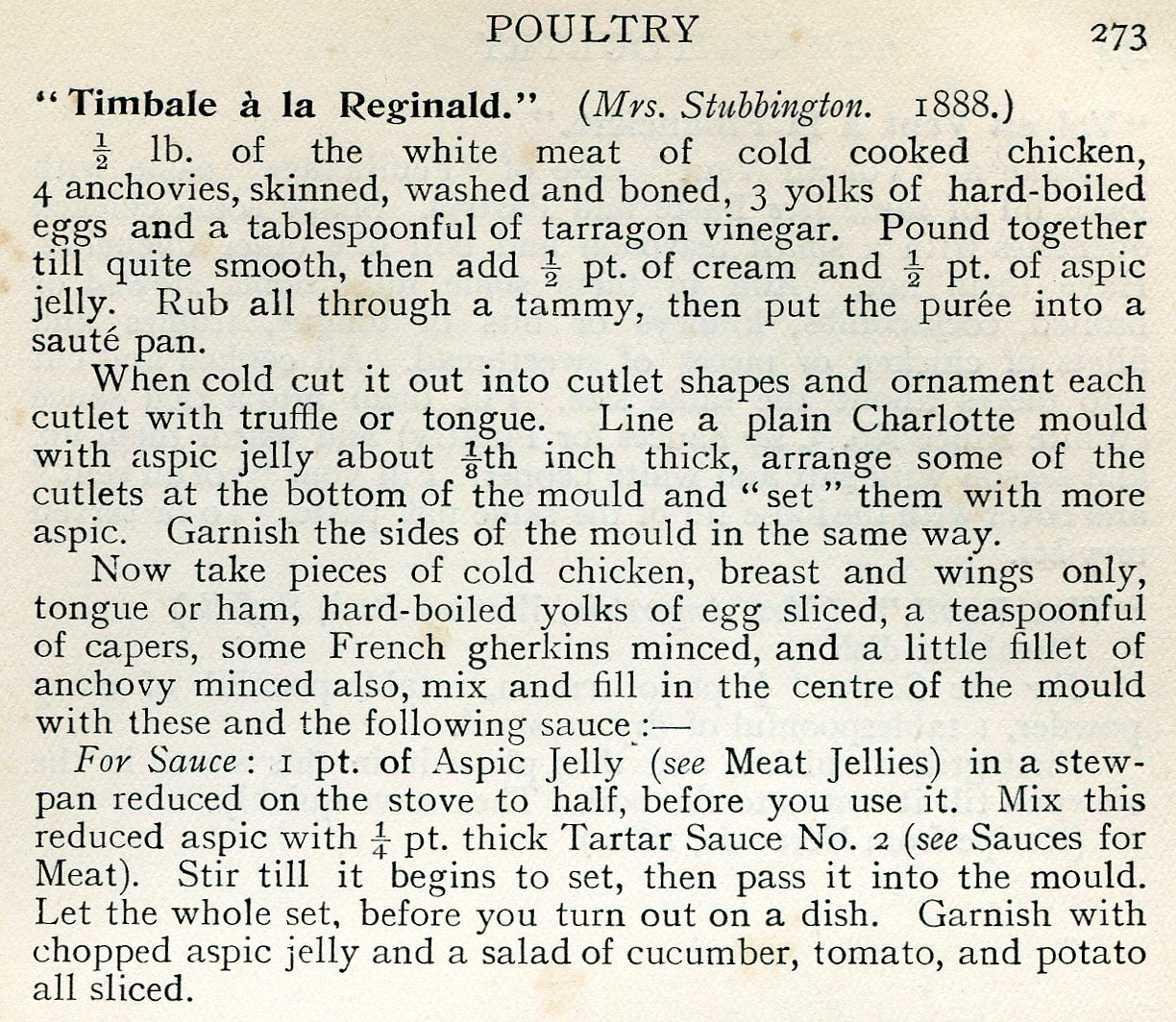
Recipe for "Timbale a la Reginald" (on page 273), attributed to a Mrs. Stubbington, 1888

Each recipe is presented quite plainly, with a title which is numbered if there is more than one recipe for a given dish. There is no list of ingredients: each recipe begins at once, as for instance "Pound the slightly scalded fish, pound also 1/2 lb. of suet shred very fine, and 2 ozs. of stale bread-crumbs, and 1 egg well beaten." Many recipes have a named source, sometimes with a date, as in "Rhubarb Jam. (Mrs. Davidson, Coldstone Manse. 1886.)"

Some of Lady Clark's recipes are very brief, forming little more than notes to herself, as in her

Vegetable Marrow. No. 3. Stuffed—Turin. 'Cousses'.

The Turin vegetable marrows are small and short—perhaps 2 inches long; (Note: These are now called courgettes or zucchini.) they are stuffed with forcemeat, and served in a thick sauce.

They come as a 'frittura' after the soup, and are sometimes called 'Zucchetti à la Piedmontaise.'"

It can be seen that instructions, ingredients and comments are intermixed.

The recipes in each section are listed alphabetically. Some entries are cross-references, for example "'Zucchetti à la Milanaise' and 'à la Piedmontaise.' See Vegetable Marrow."

=== Editions ===
For most of the twentieth century there was only one edition, that of 1909, published by Constable:

- Frere, Catherine Frances (editor). (1909) The Cookery Book of Lady Clark of Tillypronie. London: Constable and Company.

This changed in the 1990s:

- (1994) The Cookery Book of Lady Clark of Tillypronie, with an Introduction by Geraldene Holt. Lewes: Southover.

== Reception ==
=== Contemporary ===
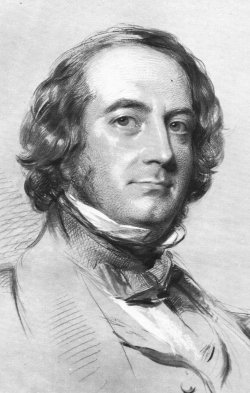
Contemporary critics noted the distinguished origin of the recipes; Lord Houghton contributed one for a mutton and oyster pudding.

The feminist author Virginia Woolf reviewed the book in the Times Literary Supplement in 1909, writing that "Cookery books are delightful to read... A charming directness stamps them, with their imperative 'Take an uncooked fowl and split its skin from end to end' (Note: This is from page 261 in the recipe for "Chicken Galantine. No. 1. (Cataldi.)") and their massive commonsense which stares frivolity out of countenance".

The Spectator review in 1909 speculates that Lady Clark inherited the "practical study of cookery" from her father, "Mr. Justice Coltman" who though "abstemious himself" was "careful to provide a well-furnished table for his guests". The review remarks on "the distinguished origin of many of the recipes", noting Spanish recipes from the travel writer Richard Ford; "ginger yeast" by Florence Nightingale's father; "Poet's Pudding" by Samuel Rogers; and Lord Houghton's mutton and oyster pudding.

=== Modern ===
The cookery writer Elizabeth David describes one of Lady Clark's recipes in her 1970 book Spices, Salt and Aromatics in the English Kitchen as follows:

Thick Parmesan Biscuits. A little-known recipe from The Cookery Book of Lady Clark of Tillypronie...it is for the ideas, the historical aspect and the feeling of authenticity, the certainty that these recipes were actually used and the dishes successful...that this book is so valuable. This recipe is an exceptionally good one...:

For a dozen biscuits: 1/4 lb. plain flour, 2 oz. each of butter and grated Parmesan, the yolk of one egg, salt, cayenne pepper. Rub the butter into the flour, add the cheese, egg and seasonings. Moisten with a little water if necessary. Roll out the dough to the thickness of half an inch. Cut into 1 inch diameter rounds. Arrange on a baking sheet. Bake in the centre or lower centre of a very moderate oven, gas No. 2, or 310–330°F., for just on 20 minutes. Serve hot. (Note: The recipe is on page 66, "Parmesan Biscuits—Thick".)

Lady Clark makes the point that it is the thickness of these biscuits that gives them their character...the biscuits can be stored in a tin and heated up when wanted.

Sue Dyson and Roger McShane, reviewing the book on foodtourist.com, call the collection valuable and significant for three reasons: its "broad range", giving an insight into 19th century society; for being the work of many people, whose recipes Clark had collected; and for its "deep effect" on Elizabeth David. Dyson and McShane state (after discussing the contents) that "The recipes are not difficult as Lady Clark preferred simplicity and was annoyed with contrivance." They write that "The recipes on meat and poultry are very strong and range over the normal meats such as beef and pork and then on to many game dishes as would be expected of someone living in the highlands of Scotland." They conclude with the recommendation "An excellent addition to your food library!"

Vanessa Kimbell of the Sourdough School writes that Frere carefully catalogued all the recipes, removing any that she could trace to a published source, and comments that they "are all delightfully straight forward". In her view, most "keen cooks" collect recipes, but for Clark, it was more, becoming her way of life. Kimbell notes that Clark "collected cooked and annotated over three thousand pages of manuscripts and recipes between 1841 and 1897, including many from her time spent living in France and Italy." Kimbell concludes that "This extraordinary book is a delight to cook from. [Frere's] diligence in putting together this vast collection of recipes resulted in one of the most charming, straightforward and thorough recipe books of the late nineteenth century with recipes that are still remarkably very useable today."

In her introduction to the 1994 edition, Geraldene Holt writes that while most cooks collect recipes, Clark's achievement was "astonishing", her thousands of pages of notes on dishes she had liked "not only written over every available margin, but often crossed like a shepherd's plaid". Holt observes of the book that the abiding impression Clark's book made on her was its modernity: "simple cooking with unblemished, distinctive flavours – her worst criticism of a dish is that it tastes dull". This was accompanied by Clark's "eclecticism", from her childhood spent travelling and her adult life as a diplomat's wife". The result was a set of recipes which "still appeal to present-day tastes."

In her book A Caledonian Feast, Annette Hope calls Lady Clark "admirable", describing the book as "epitomis[ing] the gastronomic life of late Victorian aristocracy." Hope comments that Clark was unusual in that society in being uninterested in "ostentation", but instead demonstrating "a delicate appreciation of quality." Hope adds that Lady Clark's "personal jottings – sometimes no more than aides-mémoire – unconsciously convey the world of the late Victorian hostess in London, abroad, and at home in Tillypronie."

== Bibliography ==
- Frere, Catherine Frances (editor). (1909) The Cookery Book of Lady Clark of Tillypronie. London: Constable and Company. OCLC 752897816.
- ––– (1994) The Cookery Book of Lady Clark of Tillypronie, with an Introduction by Geraldene Holt. Lewes: Southover. OCLC 751679281. ISBN 978-1-870-96210-0.
