= Hexenuronic acid =

Chemical compound (C13H20O10)

Names
- IUPAC name (2S,3R,4S)-3,4-dihydroxy-2-[(2R,3R,4S,5R)-4-hydroxy-2,5-dimethoxyoxan-3-yl]oxy-3,4-dihydro-2H-pyran-6-carboxylic acid
- Other names 4-deoxy-4-hexenopyranosyluronic acid 4-deoxy-beta-L-threo-hex-4-enopyranosyluronic acid

Identifiers
3D model (JSmol)	Interactive image
Abbreviations	HexA
MeSH	C095263
PubChem CID	102073560
- InChI: InChI=1S/C13H20O10/c1-19-7-4-21-13(20-2)10(9(7)16)23-12-8(15)5(14)3-6(22-12)11(17)18/h3,5,7-10,12-16H,4H2,1-2H3,(H,17,18)/t5-,7+,8+,9-,10+,12+,13+/m0/s1 Key: YIUVUZOUGAOFMC-CAIVYNQRSA-N
- SMILES: CO[C@@H]1CO[C@H]([C@@H]([C@H]1O)O[C@@H]2[C@@H]([C@H](C=C(O2)C(=O)O)O)O)OC

Properties
Chemical formula	C_{13}H_{20}O_{10}
Molar mass	336.293 g·mol^{−1}
- Except where otherwise noted, data are given for materials in their standard state (at 25 °C [77 °F], 100 kPa). Infobox references

Hexenuronic acid (HexA) is an organic compound with the formula C_{13}H_{20}O_{10}. It is an unsaturated sugar produced during the kraft process in the creation of wood pulp.

== Kraft process ==
During the kraft process, which is the turning of wood into wood pulp for papermaking, wood chips are treated with sodium hydroxide and sodium sulfide. Sodium hydroxide catalyzes the demethylation of 4-O-methyl-D-glucuronoxylan, which is found at the ends of the polysaccharide xylan.

Break down of 4-O-methyl-D-glucuronoxylan into HexA

Hexenuronic acid decreases a wood's kappa number, which is a measure of bleachability of wood pulp, by 3-7. It readily reacts with common wood pulp bleaching agents like ozone, peracetic acid, and chlorine dioxide. Consequently, research has focused on ways to break down hexenuronic acid prior to bleaching to decrease dangerous waste products and costs.

The main method of destroying hexenuronic acid is to treat the wood pulp post kraft processing with strong acids at high temperatures. HexA is hydrolyzed and broken down into aldehydes and alcohols like 2-furoic acid and 5-carboxy-2-furaldehdye. This process has led to a 50% reduction in bleaching costs of the wood pulp in some cases.

== In microbes ==
Polysaccharide lyases (PL) are a type of enzyme that is found in numerous microorganisms including bacteriophages that break down parts of wood. PL catalyzses β-elimination of uronic acid-containing polysaccharides into HexA.
