= Mixed-linkage glucan : Xyloglucan endotransglucosylase =

Mixed-linkage glucan : xyloglucan endotransglucosylase (MXE) is a plant cell wall-modifying enzyme found in plants of the genus Equisetum. The enzyme is proposed, in vivo, to catalyse the endotransglucosylation of two different hemicellulose polysaccharides, mixed-linkage glucan and xyloglucan, by effectively 'stitching' them together. However only the 'stitching' of a mixed-linkage glucan polysaccharide to a xyloglucan oligosaccharide has actually been witnessed to date. MXE activity is not found in cereals.

Intriguingly, MXE activity is also found in Charophyta green algae, the closest living relatives to the land plants as a whole – a much more ancient divide than between Equisetum and cereals. That said, considering searches in more closely related groups of plants have failed to turn up a real MXE (not a side reaction of a xyloglucan endotransglucosylase/hydrolase, XTH), the Charophyta result may also be a side reaction.

== Location ==
The enzyme has only been assayed in a crude cell extract, so its exact location in the plant was not yet determined. But with its two main substrates identified to be hemicelloses, this suggests that the enzyme is expected to be found in the apoplast.

== Role in plants ==
MXE has a role in the strengthening of cell walls which implies its contribution to cessation of growth. This is largely due to the correlation of MXE activity in crude extracts with the age of the cell, crude extracts from older cells exhibit higher MXE activity.
