= Kappa number =

Measure of lignin content in wood pulp

The kappa number is an indication of the residual lignin content or bleachability of wood pulp by a standardized analysis method.

== Measuring method ==
The kappa number is determined by ISO 302:2004. ISO 302 is applicable to all kinds of chemical pulps and semi-chemical pulps and gives a kappa number in the range 1–100. The kappa number is a measure of the standard potassium permanganate solution that the pulp will consume. The measurement is inflated by the presence of hexenuronic acids in the pulp. These compounds are formed during the chemical pulping process, from the hemicelluloses.

The kappa number can be monitored by online kappa analysers in a pulp mill, but these have to be calibrated with the ISO 302:2004 method.

== Application ==
The kappa number estimates the amount of chemicals required during bleaching of wood pulp to obtain a pulp with a given degree of whiteness. Since the amount of bleach needed is related to the lignin content of the pulp, the kappa number can be used to monitor the effectiveness of the lignin-extraction phase of the pulping process. It is approximately proportional to the residual lignin content of the pulp:

$$K \approx c \times L$$

where:

- $K$ is the kappa number;
- $c$ is a constant of approximately 6.57 (dependent on process and wood);
- $L$ is the lignin content in percent.

Kappa numbers for bleachable pulps are in the range 25–30, for sack paper pulps in the range 45–55, and for corrugated fiberboard pulps in the range 60–110.
