= Streptomyces purpurascens =

Scientific classification
- Domain: Bacteria
- Kingdom: Bacillati
- Phylum: Actinomycetota
- Class: Actinomycetes
- Order: Streptomycetales
- Family: Streptomycetaceae
- Genus: Streptomyces
- Species: S. purpurascens

Binomial name
- Streptomyces purpurascens Lindenbein 1952

Type strain
- ATCC 25489, BCRC 11872, CBS 917.69, CCRC 11872, DSM 40310, ETH 31514, IFO 13077, ISP 5310, JCM 4509, KCTC 9848, Maria 515, NBIMCC 1155, NBRC 13077, NRRL B-12230, NRRL-ISP 5310, PCM 2299, RIA 1269, VKM Ac-755, Wilde Maria 515

Species of bacterium

Streptomyces purpurascens is a bacterium species from the genus of Streptomyces which has been isolated from soil. Streptomyces purpurascens produces α-l-arabinofuranosidase, isorhodomycin A, rhodomycin A and rhodomycin B.

== See also ==
- List of Streptomyces species
