= Acetylxylan esterase =

Class of enzymes

acetylxylan esterase
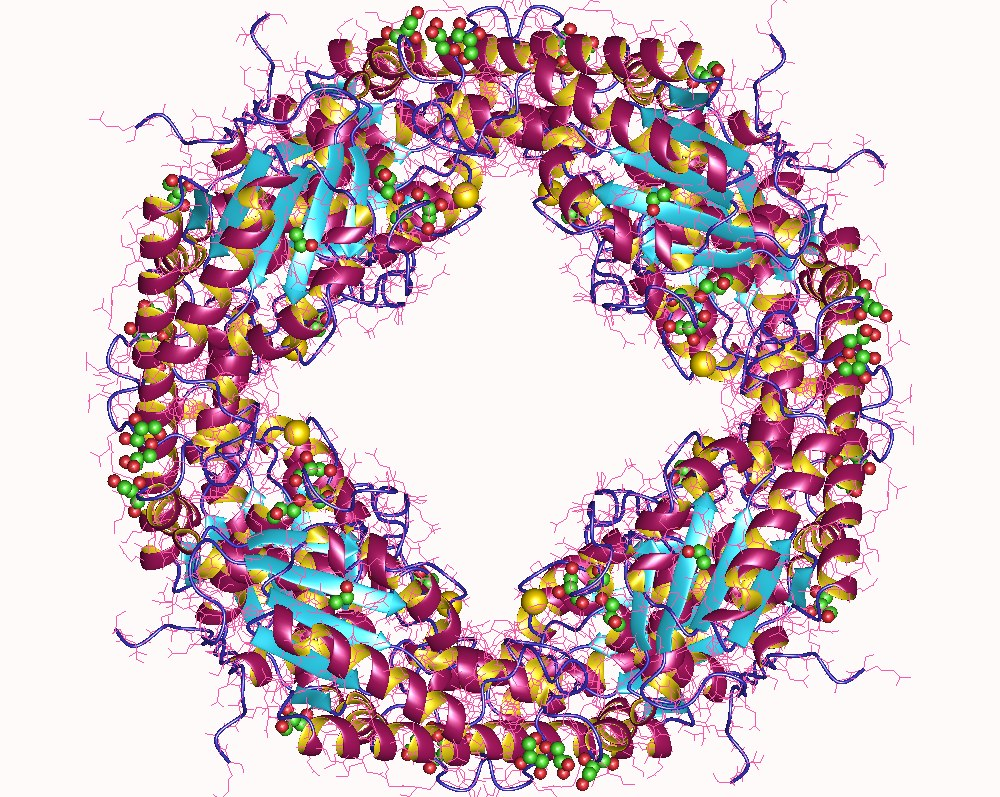
- Acetylxylan esterase oktamer, Geobacillus stearothermophilus

Identifiers
- EC no.: 3.1.1.72

Databases
- IntEnz: IntEnz view
- BRENDA: BRENDA entry
- ExPASy: NiceZyme view
- KEGG: KEGG entry
- MetaCyc: metabolic pathway
- PRIAM: profile
- PDB structures: RCSB PDB PDBe PDBsum
- Gene Ontology: AmiGO / QuickGO
Search
- PMC: articles
- PubMed: articles
- NCBI: proteins

The enzyme acetylxylan esterase (EC 3.1.1.72) catalyzes the deacetylation of xylans and xylo-oligosaccharides.

This enzyme belongs to the family of hydrolases, specifically those acting on carboxylic ester bonds. The systematic name is acetylxylan esterase.

== Structural studies ==
As of late 2007, 4 structures have been solved for this class of enzymes, with PDB accession codes 1QOZ, 2C71, 2C79, and 2CC0.
