= Glucuronoarabinoxylan endo-1,4-beta-xylanase =

Identifiers
- EC no.: 3.2.1.136
- CAS no.: 123609-77-8

Databases
- IntEnz: IntEnz view
- BRENDA: BRENDA entry
- ExPASy: NiceZyme view
- KEGG: KEGG entry
- MetaCyc: metabolic pathway
- PRIAM: profile
- PDB structures: RCSB PDB PDBe PDBsum
Search
- PMC: articles
- PubMed: articles
- NCBI: proteins

Glucuronoarabinoxylan endo-1,4-beta-xylanase (EC 3.2.1.136, feraxan endoxylanase, feraxanase, endoarabinoxylanase, glucuronoxylan xylohydrolase, glucuronoxylanase, glucuronoxylan xylanohydrolase, glucuronoarabinoxylan 1,4-beta-D-xylanohydrolase) is an enzyme with systematic name glucuronoarabinoxylan 4-beta-D-xylanohydrolase. This enzyme catalyses the following chemical reaction

Endohydrolysis of (1->4)-beta-D-xylosyl links in some glucuronoarabinoxylans

This enzyme has high activity towards feruloylated arabinoxylans.
