= McCann's Steel Cut Irish Oatmeal =

Irish brand of oatmeal

Traditional 28-ounce tin of McCann's Steel Cut Irish Oatmeal

McCann's Steel Cut Irish Oatmeal is an Irish brand of oatmeal that is sold internationally. It consists of steel-cut oats rather than rolled oats.

== History ==
In 1800, John McCann built a mill at Beamond, County Meath, near Drogheda in Ireland. In the 19th century, John McCann's Irish Oatmeal won several international prizes for the quality of its product and much of it was exported to the United States. John McCann Jr. merged with R. R. Hill of Drogheda in 1896. The Beamond Mill closed in 1898 and the company moved to Merchant's Quay in Drogheda. In the 20th century, McCann's increased exports of its oatmeal, notably to the United States and Canada. In 1964, the then family-owned Odlums Group acquired the business and transferred production to its oatmeal mill in Sallins, County Kildare, which had been in operation since 1910.

In 2008, Sturm Foods acquired the McCann's Irish Oatmeal brand from Odlums, which by then was a wholly owned subsidiary of Origin Enterprises. TreeHouse Foods acquired the brand when they purchased Sturm Foods on 2 March 2010. On 16 July 2018, TreeHouse Foods sold the brand to B&G Foods for $32 million.

== Products ==
In addition to the traditional McCann's Steel Cut Irish Oatmeal, several other similar oat products carry the McCann's brand. These include quick steel-cut and rolled oats, as well as instant rolled oats in a variety of flavors.
