= Xylan alpha-1,2-glucuronosidase =

Identifiers
- EC no.: 3.2.1.131
- CAS no.: 114921-73-2

Databases
- IntEnz: IntEnz view
- BRENDA: BRENDA entry
- ExPASy: NiceZyme view
- KEGG: KEGG entry
- MetaCyc: metabolic pathway
- PRIAM: profile
- PDB structures: RCSB PDB PDBe PDBsum
Search
- PMC: articles
- PubMed: articles
- NCBI: proteins

Xylan alpha-1,2-glucuronosidase (EC 3.2.1.131, 1,2-alpha-glucuronidase, alpha-(1->2)-glucuronidase, xylan alpha-D-1,2-(4-O-methyl)glucuronohydrolase) is an enzyme with systematic name xylan 2-alpha-D-(4-O-methyl)glucuronohydrolase. This enzyme catalyses the following chemical reaction

Hydrolysis of (1->2)-alpha-D-(4-O-methyl)glucuronosyl links in the main chain of hardwood xylans
