= Maine Grains =

American food company

Maine Grains is an American supplier of stone milled flour, rolled oats, and other grains for culinary use. Based in Skowhegan, Maine, the company operates its gristmill in a former Somerset County jail building.

During the COVID-19 pandemic, Maine Grains saw a 4,000 percent increase in online sales. The company employs about 20 workers, milling roughly 2,000 tons of flour per year.

== Leadership ==
Amber Lambke is the co-founder and CEO of Maine Grains. She also serves as co-founder of the Maine Grain Alliance, a trade association serving the state's grain community.
