= Α-L-Arabinofuranosidase =

Class of enzymes

α-L-Arabinofuranosidase

Identifiers
- EC no.: 3.2.1.55
- CAS no.: 9067-74-7

Databases
- BRENDA: enzyme data
- ExPASy: NiceZyme view
- KEGG: enzyme entry
- MetaCyc: metabolic pathway
- Rhea: reactions
- PDB structures: RCSB PDB PDBe PDBsum
Search
- PMC: articles
- PubMed: articles
- NCBI: proteins

α-L-Arabinofuranosidase (EC 3.2.1.55, arabinosidase, α-arabinosidase, α-L-arabinosidase, α-arabinofuranosidase, polysaccharide α-L-arabinofuranosidase, α-L-arabinofuranoside hydrolase, L-arabinosidase, α-L-arabinanase) is an enzyme with systematic name α-L-arabinofuranoside arabinofuranohydrolase. It catalyses the hydrolysis of terminal non-reducing α-L-arabinofuranoside residues in α-L-arabinosides

The enzyme acts on α-L-arabinofuranosides, α-L-arabinans containing (1,3)- and/or (1,5)-linkages, arabinoxylans and arabinogalactans.
