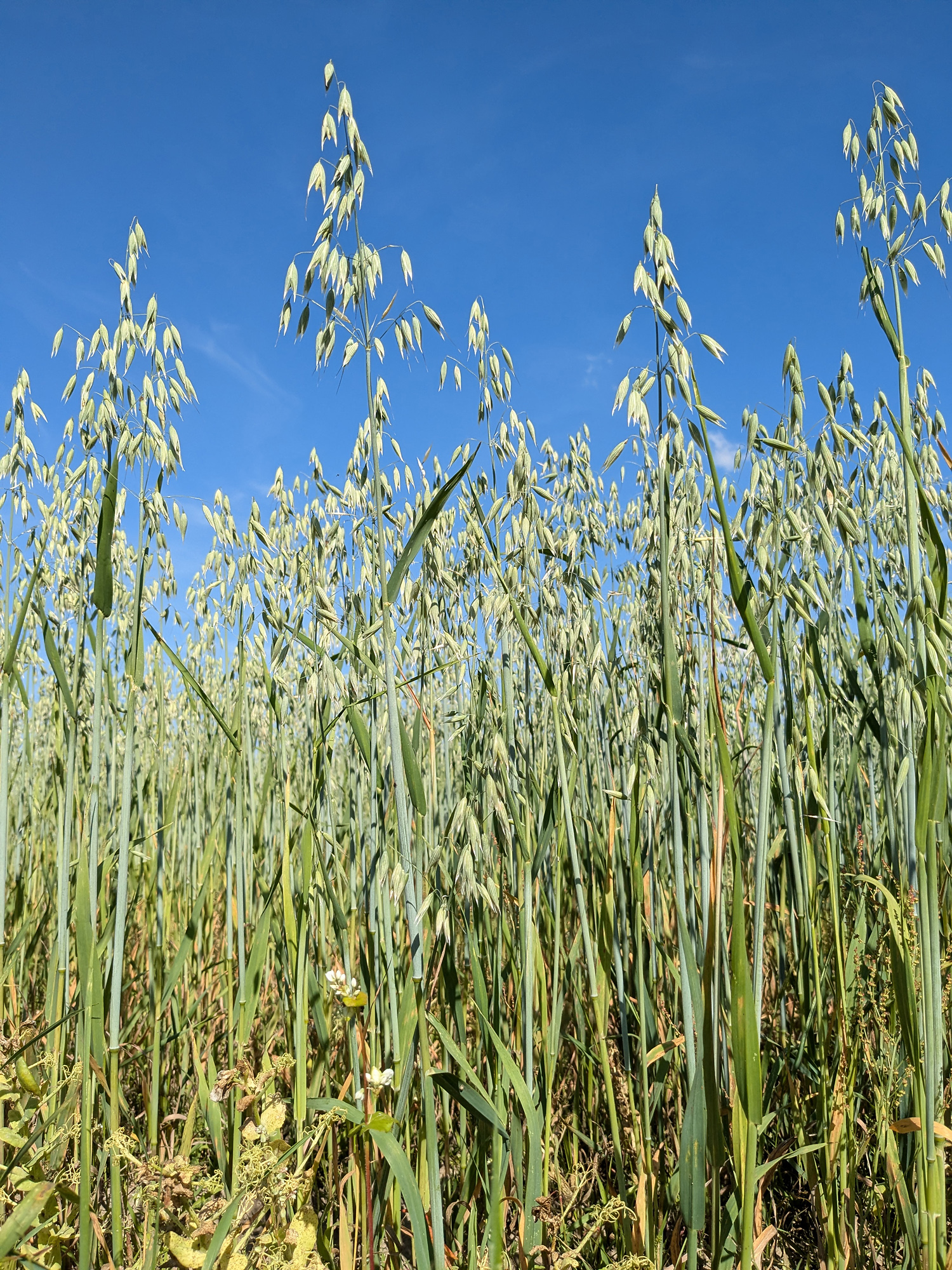

Scientific classification
- Kingdom: Plantae
- Clade: Tracheophytes
- Clade: Angiosperms
- Clade: Monocots
- Clade: Commelinids
- Order: Poales
- Family: Poaceae
- Subfamily: Pooideae
- Genus: Avena
- Species: A. sativa

Binomial name
- Avena sativa L. (1753)

= Oat =

Cereal grass and grain

The oat (Avena sativa), sometimes called the common oat, is a species of cereal grass (Avena) grown for fodder and for its seed, which is known by the same name (usually in the plural). Oats appear to have been domesticated as a secondary crop, as their seeds resembled those of other cereals closely enough for them to be included by early cultivators. Oats tolerate cold winters less well than cereals such as wheat, barley, and rye, but need less summer heat and more rain, making them important in areas such as Northwest Europe that have cool, wet summers. They can tolerate low-nutrient and acid soils. Oats grow thickly and vigorously, allowing them to outcompete many weeds, and compared to other cereals are relatively free from diseases.

Oats are used for human consumption as oatmeal, including as steel cut oats or rolled oats. Global production is dominated by Canada and Russia; global trade is a small part of production, most of the grain being consumed within the producing countries. Oats are associated with lower blood cholesterol and reduced risk of human heart disease when consumed regularly. One of the most common uses of oats is as livestock feed; the crop can also be grown as groundcover and ploughed in as a green manure.

== Description ==
The oat is a tall stout grass, a member of the family Poaceae; it can grow to a height of 1.8 metres (5.9 ft). The leaves are long, narrow, and pointed, and grow upwards; they can be some 15 to 40 centimetres (5.9 to 15.7 in) in length, and around 5 to 15 millimetres (0.20 to 0.59 in) in width. Leaf blades emerge first from nodes in the stalk, then the sheath. New leaves grow upwards on nodes further from the ground, leaves on the old nodes gradually brown and wilt. Roots are fibrous, mostly in the uppermost 0.3 metres (0.98 ft) of the soil (though some may penetrate as deep as 1.5 metres (4.9 ft), and develop from a crown at the soil surface. When seeds are dense, they make only one or two hollow stems (culms), but when spaced out may make 10 to 30 culms.

At the top of the stem, the plant branches into a loose cluster or panicle of about 10-75 spikelets. While they tend to self pollinate, 1-2% may outcross. There are 7-9 nodes, with one leaf at each node and hollow internodes. These contain the wind-pollinated flowers, which mature into the oat seeds or grains. Botanically the grain is a caryopsis, as the wall of the fruit is fused on to the actual seed. Like other cereal grains, the caryopsis contains the outer husk or bran, the starchy food store or endosperm which occupies most of the seed, and the protein-rich germ which if planted in soil can grow into a new plant.

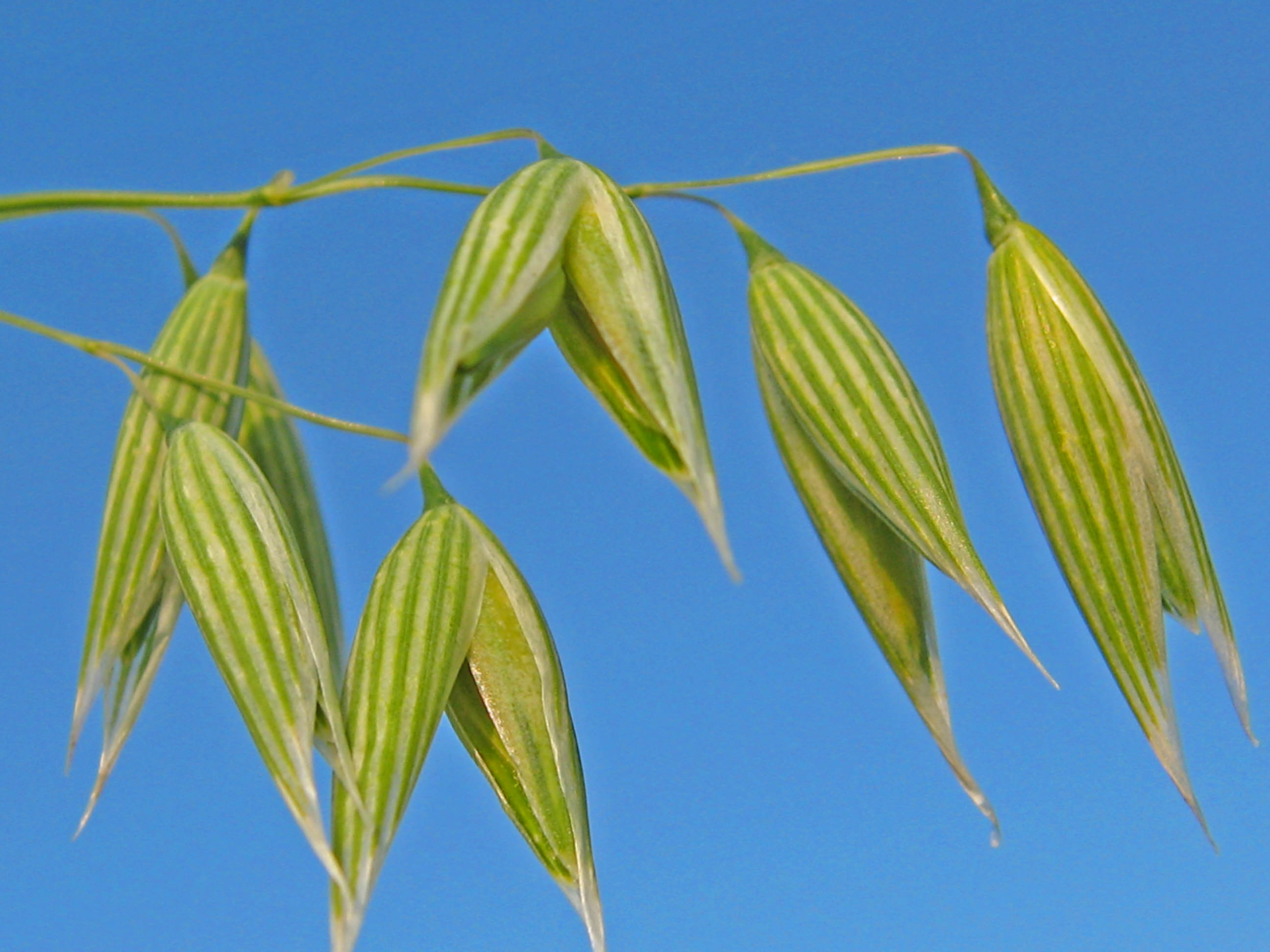
Oat spikelets, containing the small wind-pollinated flowers

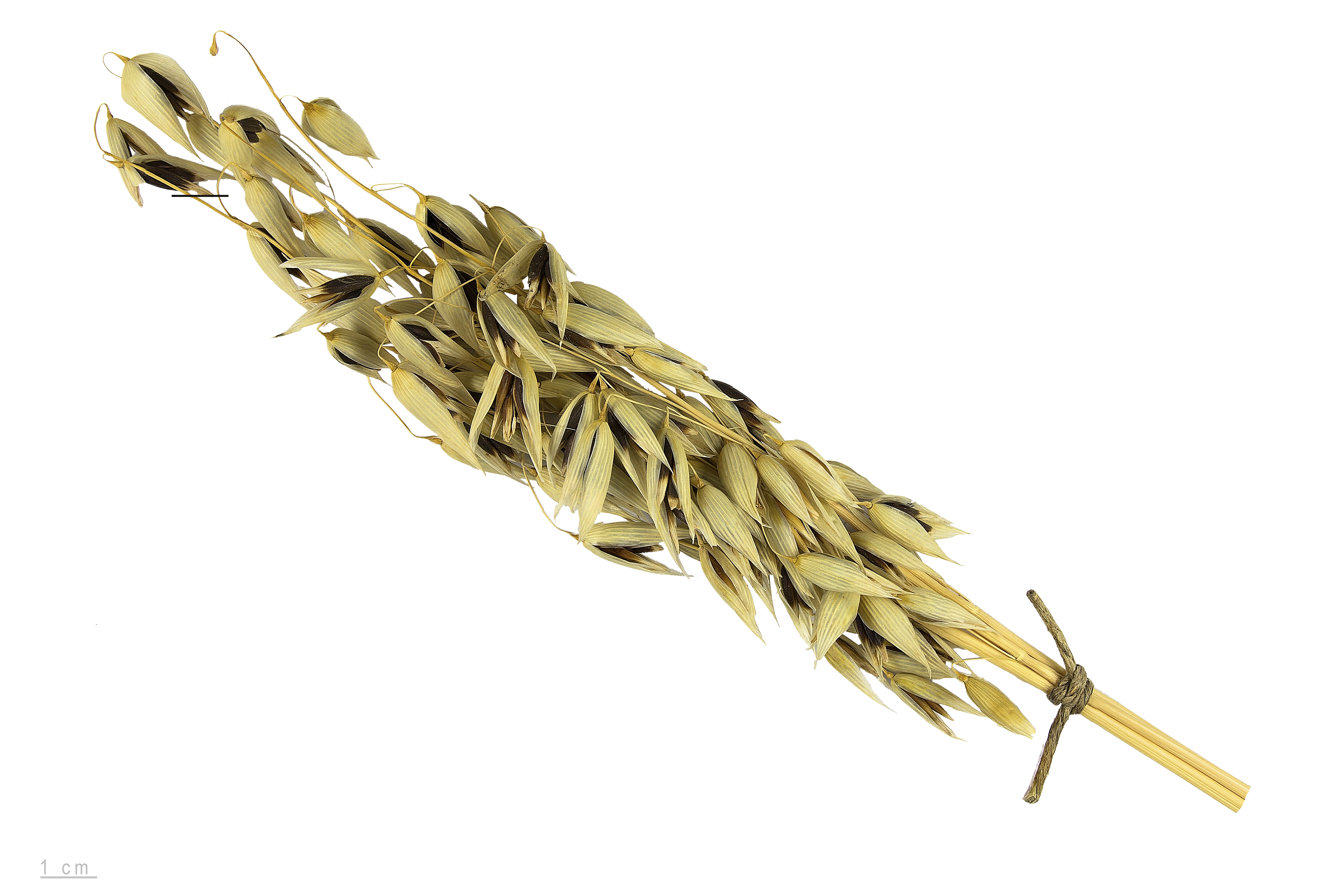
Panicle with spikelets containing seeds

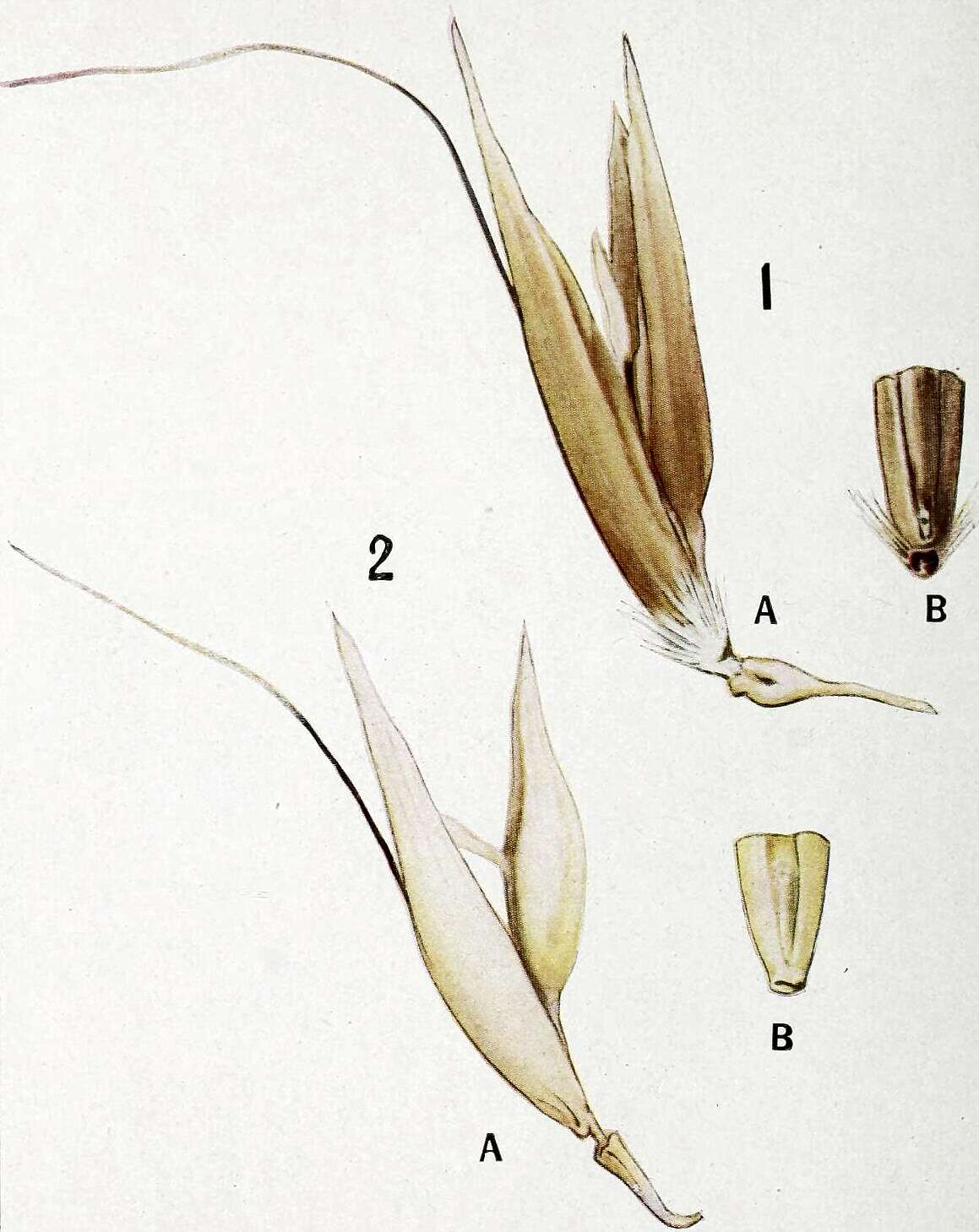
1 A. sterilis, 2 A. sativa, spikelet and base of outer grain of both cultivated species

== Origins ==
=== Phylogeny ===
Oat ancestry, showing how hexaploid species including the common oat Avena sativa derive from diploid and tetraploid species

Phylogenetic analysis using molecular DNA and morphological evidence places the oat genus Avena in the Pooideae subfamily. That subfamily includes the cereals wheat, barley, and rye; they are in the Triticeae tribe, while Avena is in the Poeae, along with grasses such as Briza and Agrostis. The wild ancestor of Avena sativa and the closely related minor crop – A. byzantina – is A. sterilis, a naturally hexaploid wild oat, one that has its DNA in six sets of chromosomes. Genetic evidence shows that the ancestral forms of A. sterilis grew in the Fertile Crescent of the Near East.

Analysis of maternal lineages of 25 Avena species using chloroplast and mitochondrial DNA showed that A. sativa's hexaploid genome derives from three diploid oat species (each with two sets of chromosomes); the sets are dubbed A, B, C, and D. The diploid species are the CC A. ventricosa, the AA A. canariensis, and the AA A. longiglumis, along with two tetraploid oats (each with four sets), namely the AACC A. insularis and the AABB A. agadiriana. Tetraploids were formed as much as 10.6 mya, and hexaploids as much as 7.4 mya. Crosses among tetraploid or hexaploid species are fully fertile, but diploid species vary in how they interbreed. Crosses among species with different ploidy may be sterile or partially fertile.

=== Domestication ===
Genomic study suggests that the hulled variety and the naked variety A. sativa var. nuda diverged around 51,200 years ago, long before domestication. This implies that the two varieties were domesticated independently.

Oats are thought to have emerged as a secondary crop. This means that they are derived from what was considered a weed of the primary cereal domesticates such as wheat. They survived as a Vavilovian mimic by having grains that Neolithic people found hard to distinguish from the primary crop.

Oats were cultivated for some thousands of years before they were domesticated. A granary from the Pre-Pottery Neolithic, about 11,400 to 11,200 years ago in the Jordan Valley in the Middle East contained a large number of wild oat grains (120,000 seeds of A. sterilis). The find implies intentional cultivation. Domesticated oat grains first appear in the archaeological record in Europe around 3000 years ago.

Oat seed dispersal is facilitated by two awns that are part of each seed head. After falling to the ground, these long, slender structures twist as they dry in sun and as they are re-moistened by dew and rain. As a result, the seeds moved along the ground until falling into gaps in the soil, essentially planting themselves. Domestication has selected for loss of awns, since seeds are now planted by humans, and larger seeds.

== Agronomy ==
=== Cultivation ===
Oats are annual plants best grown in temperate regions. They tolerate cold winters less well than wheat, rye, or barley; they are harmed by sustained cold below −7 °C (20 °F). They have a lower summer heat requirement and greater tolerance of (and need for) rain than the other cereals mentioned, so they are particularly important in areas with cool, wet summers, such as Northwest Europe.

Oats can grow in most fertile, drained soils, being tolerant of a wide variety of soil types. Although better yields are achieved at a soil pH of 5.3 to 5.7, oats can tolerate soils with a pH as low as 4.5. They are better able to grow in low-nutrient soils than wheat or maize, but generally are less tolerant of high soil salinity than other cereals. In the US, Midwestern crops are sown in spring and the Southern crops in autumn. In the Corn Belt, oats are grown in crop rotation following corn, soybeans, and forages. Mature oats are harvested by a combine, either directly or after drying by windrowing, since their moisture must not exceed 13% to be safely stored. The straw is either mixed in with humus or as bedding for livestock. Traditionally, US farmers grew oats alongside red clover and alfalfa, which fixed nitrogen and provided animal forage. The first year's harvest yielded oat grain but later years gave way to hay. With less use of horses and more use of fertilizers, growth of these crops in the US declined. For example, the state of Iowa led US oat production until 1989, but has largely switched to maize and soybeans.

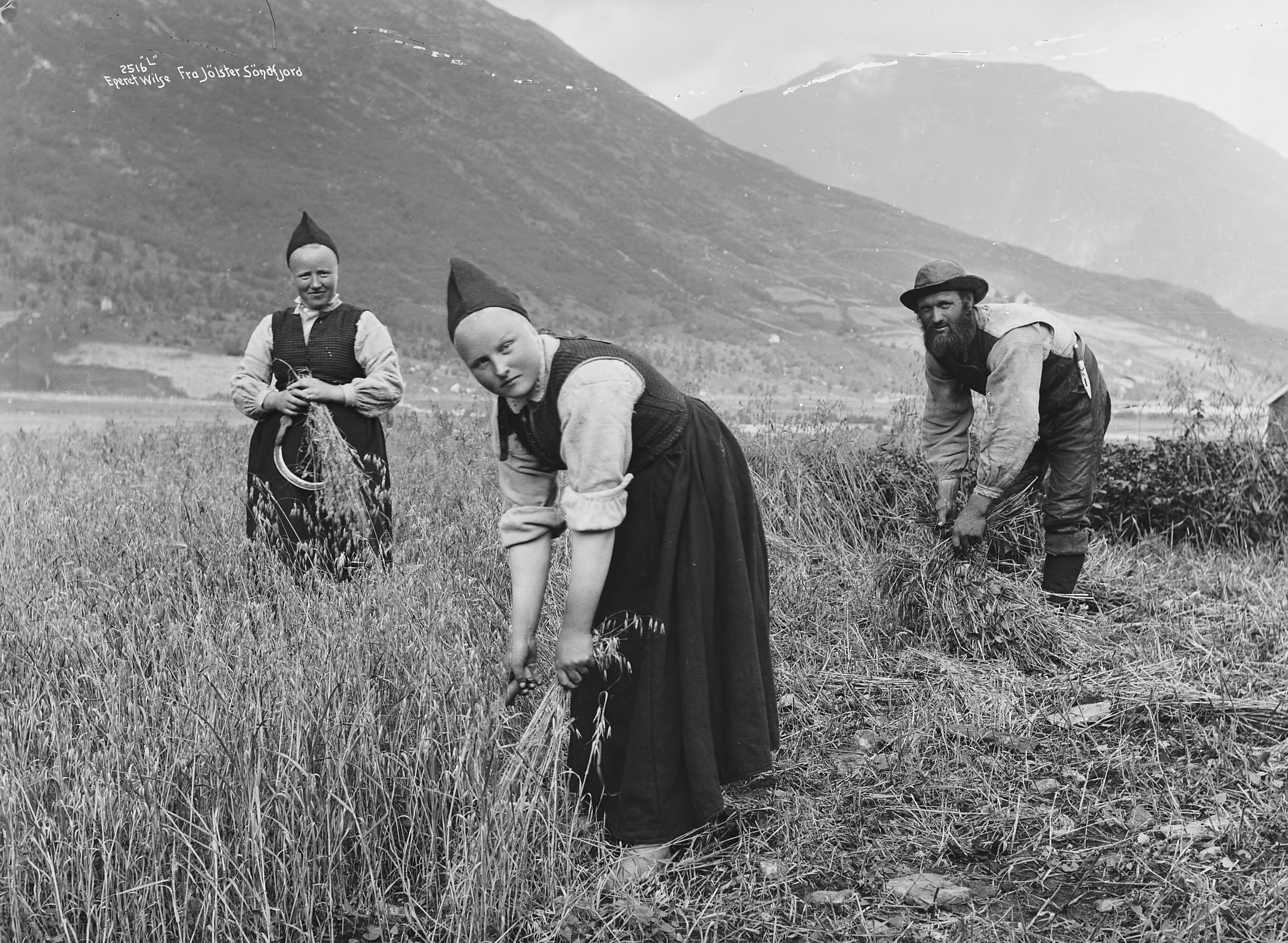
Harvest in Jølster Municipality, Norway, c. 1890.

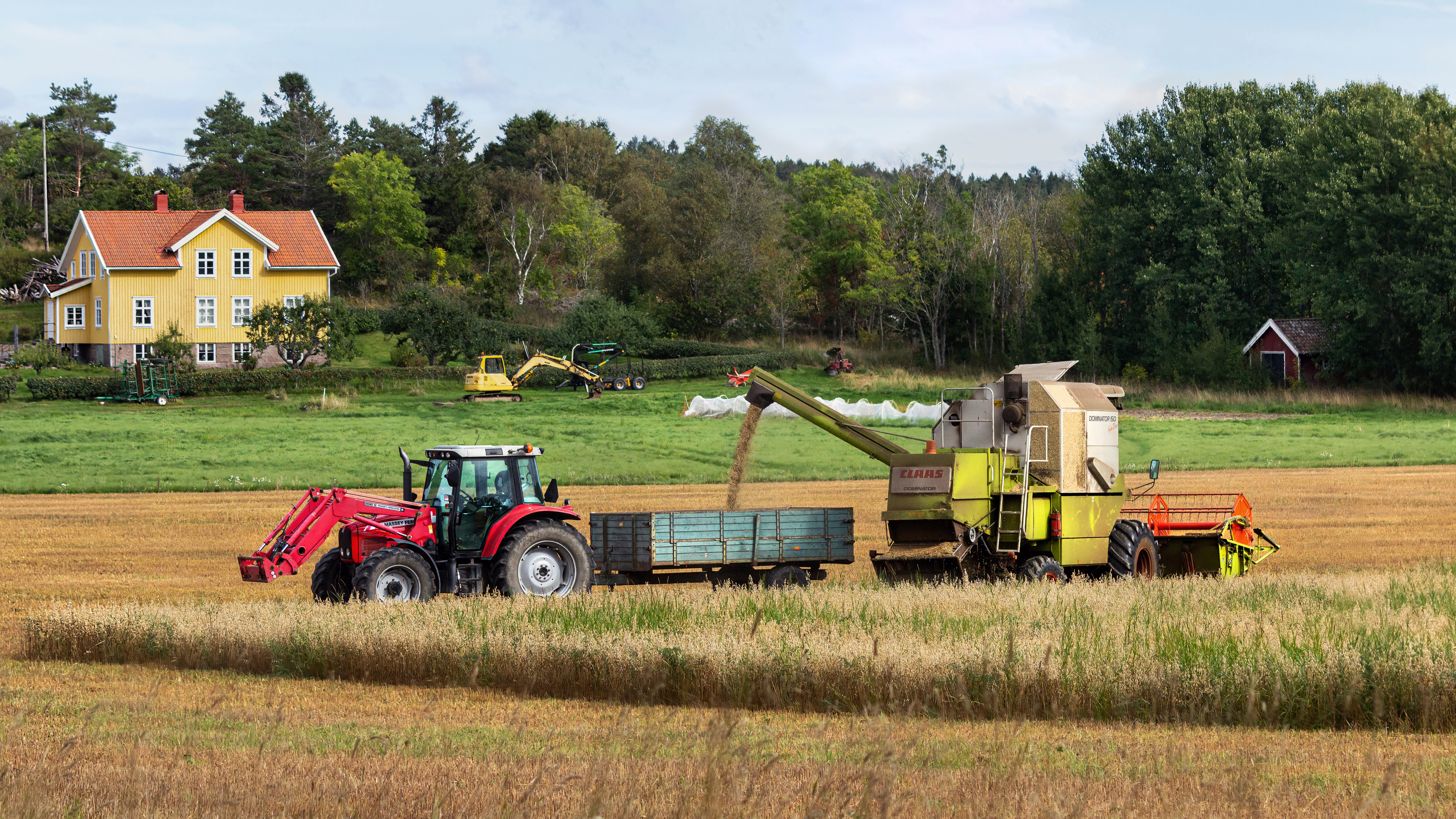
Harvesting oats in Brastad, Sweden, 2021

=== Weeds, pests, and diseases ===
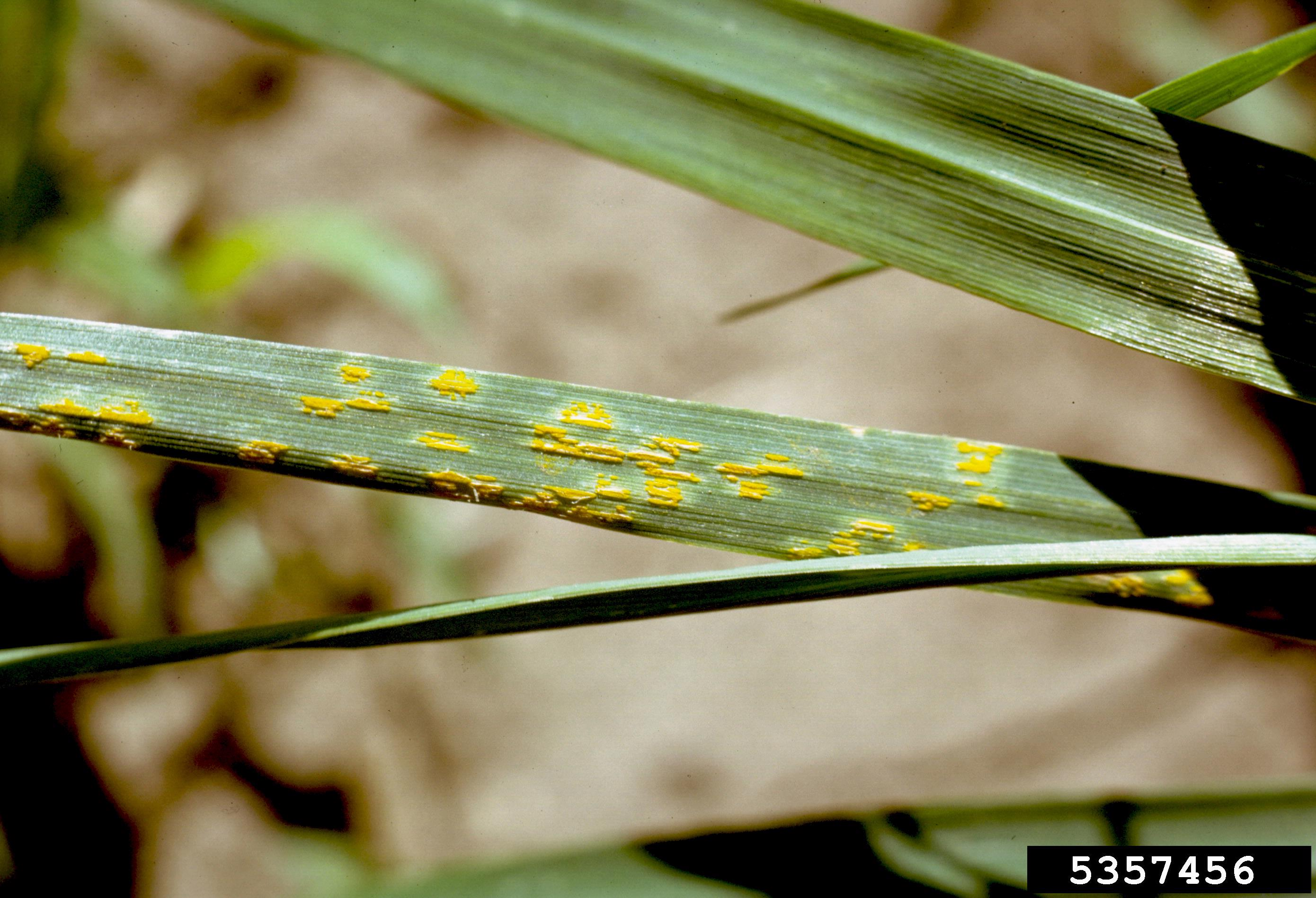
Oat leaf infected with crown rust

Oats can outcompete many weeds, as they grow thickly (with many leafy shoots) and vigorously, but are still subject to some broadleaf weeds. Control can be by herbicides, or by integrated pest management with measures such as sowing seed that is free of weeds.

Oats are relatively free from diseases. Nonetheless, they suffer from some leaf diseases, such as stem rust (Puccinia graminis f. sp. avenae) and crown rust (P. coronata var. avenae). Crown rust infection can greatly reduce photosynthesis and overall physiological activities of oat leaves, thereby reducing growth and crop yield.

Both crown-rust and stem-rust have developed into races which attack different oat varieties. When resistant oat varieties are developed, new disease races tend to develop.

=== Processing ===
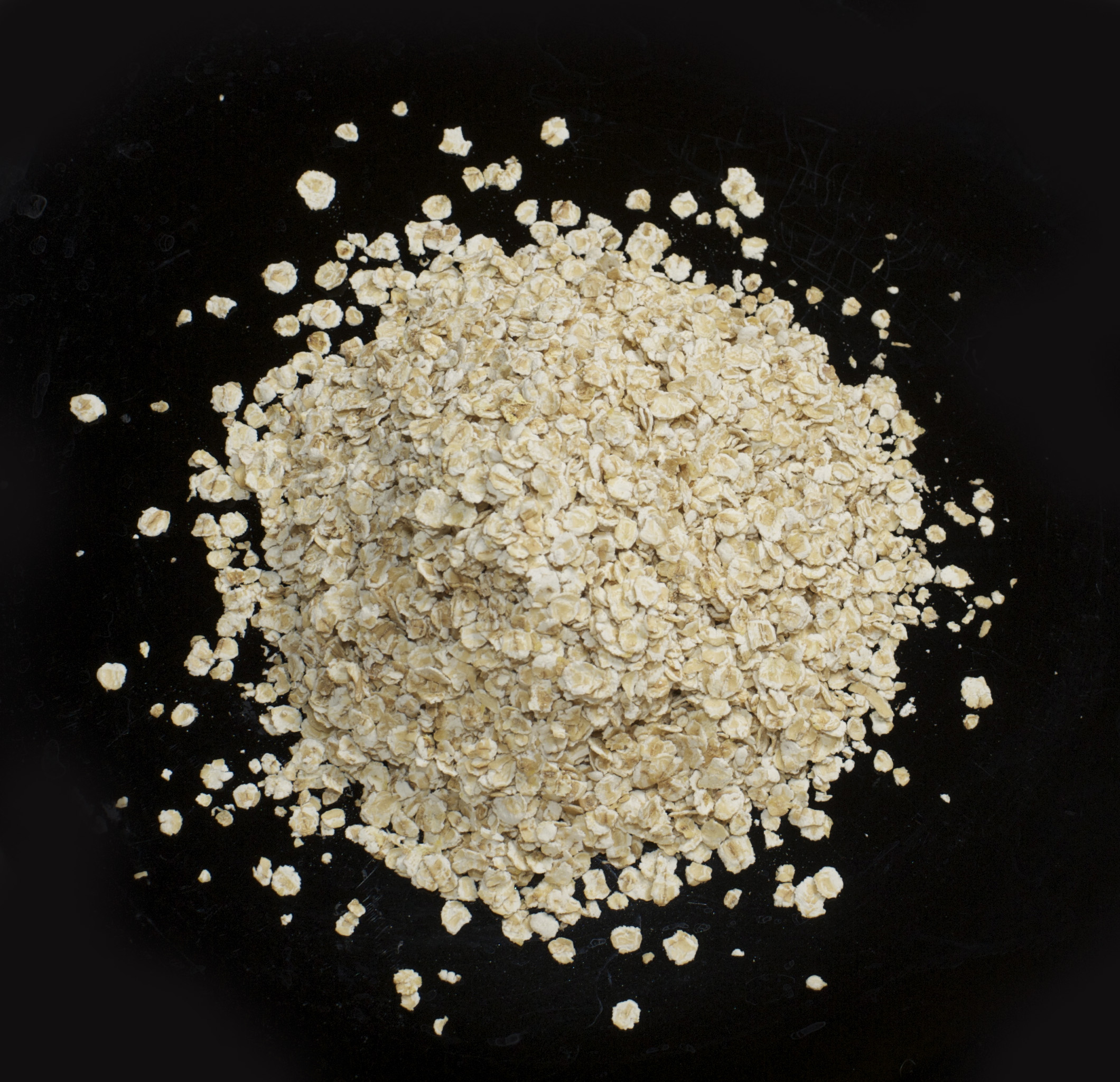
Fully-processed porridge oats, ready to cook

Harvested oats go through multiple stages of milling. The first stage is cleaning, to remove seeds of other plants, stones and any other extraneous materials. Next is dehulling to remove the indigestible hull, leaving the seed or "groat". Heating denatures enzymes in the seed that would make it go sour or rancid; the grain is then dried to minimise the risk of spoilage by bacteria and fungi. There may follow numerous stages of cutting or grinding the grain, depending on which sort of product is required. For oatmeal (oat flour), the grain is ground to a specified fineness. For home use such as making porridge, oats are often rolled flat to make them quicker to cook.

Oat flour can be ground for small scale use by pulsing rolled oats or old-fashioned (not quick) oats in a food processor or spice mill.

== Production ==
Oats production 2024, millions of tonnes
| Canada | 3.4 |
| Russia | 3.0 |
| Poland | 1.6 |
| Australia | 1.3 |
| Finland | 1.2 |
| Brazil | 1.1 |
| World | 22.4 |
Source: FAOSTAT of the United Nations

In 2024, world production of oats was 22 million tonnes, led by Canada with 15% of the total and Russia with 13% (table).

Production of oats

Oat yield

== Genomics ==
=== Genome ===
Avena sativa is an allohexaploid species with three ancestral genomes (2n=6x=42; AACCDD). As a result, the genome is large (12.6 Gb, 1C-value=12.85) and complex. Cultivated hexaploid oat has a unique mosaic chromosome architecture that is the result of numerous translocations between the three subgenomes. These translocations may cause breeding barriers and incompatibilities when crossing varieties with different chromosomal architecture. Hence, oat breeding and the crossing of desired traits has been hampered by the lack of a reference genome assembly. In May 2022, a fully annotated reference genome sequence of Avena sativa was reported. The AA subgenome is presumed to be derived from Avena longiglumis and the CCDD from the tetraploid Avena insularis.

=== Genetics and breeding ===
The US Department of Agriculture oversees the world oat collection, a set of 14,000 genetic lines of 42-chromosome species. These are used to breed for yield of new species, higher quality existing crops, and resistance against lodging and disease.

Species of Avena can hybridize, and genes introgressed (brought in) from other "A" genome species have contributed many valuable traits, like resistance to oat crown rust. Pc98 is one such trait, introgressed from A. sterilis CAV 1979, conferring all stage resistance (ASR) against Pca.

It is possible to hybridize oats with grasses in other genera, allowing plant breeders the ready introgression of traits. In contrast to wheat, oats sometimes retain chromosomes from maize or pearl millet after such crosses. These wide crosses are typically made to generate doubled haploid breeding material; the rapid loss of the alien chromosomes from the unrelated pollen donor results in a plant with only a single set of chromosomes (a haploid).

The addition lines with alien chromosomes can be used as a source for novel traits in oats. For example, research on oat-maize-addition lines has been used to map genes involved in C4 photosynthesis. To obtain Mendelian inheritance of these novel traits, radiation hybrid lines have been established, where maize chromosome segments have been introgressed into the oat genome. This potentially transfers thousands of genes from a species that is distantly related, but is not considered a GMO technique.

A 2013 study applied simple sequence repeat and found five major groupings, namely commercial cultivars and four landrace groups.

== Nutrition ==
=== Nutrients ===
Uncooked oats
Nutritional value per 100 g (3.5 oz)
- Energy: 1,628 kJ (389 kcal)
- Carbohydrates: 66.3 g
- Dietary fiber: 11.6 g
- Fat: 6.9 g
- Saturated: 1.21 g
- Monounsaturated: 2.18 g
- Polyunsaturated: 2.54 g
- Protein: 16.9 g
Vitamins and minerals
| Vitamins | Quantity %DV^{†} |
| Thiamine (B1) | 64% 0.763 mg |
| Riboflavin (B2) | 11% 0.139 mg |
| Niacin (B3) | 6% 0.961 mg |
| Pantothenic acid (B5) | 27% 1.349 mg |
| Vitamin B6 | 7% 0.12 mg |
| Folate (B9) | 14% 56 μg |
| Minerals | Quantity %DV^{†} |
| Calcium | 4% 54 mg |
| Iron | 28% 5 mg |
| Magnesium | 42% 177 mg |
| Manganese | 213% 4.9 mg |
| Phosphorus | 42% 523 mg |
| Potassium | 14% 429 mg |
| Sodium | 0% 2 mg |
| Zinc | 36% 4 mg |
- Other constituents: Quantity
- Water: 8 g
- β-glucans (soluble fiber): 4 g
- USDA FoodData Central entry
- ^{†}Percentages estimated using US recommendations for adults, except for potassium, which is estimated based on expert recommendation from the National Academies.

Uncooked oats are 66% carbohydrates, including 11% dietary fiber and 4% beta-glucans, 7% fat, 17% protein, and 8% water (table). In a reference serving of 100 g (3.5 oz), oats provide 389 kilocalories (1,630 kJ) and are a rich source (20% or more of the Daily Value, DV) of protein (34% DV), dietary fiber (44% DV), several B vitamins, and numerous dietary minerals, especially manganese (213% DV) (table).

=== Health effects ===
==== Blood lipids ====
Regular consumption of oat products lowers blood levels of low-density lipoprotein and total cholesterol, reducing the risk of cardiovascular disease. The beneficial effect of oat consumption on lowering blood lipids is attributed to oat beta-glucan.

In response to the 1980s oat bran fad in the United States (described below), the Food and Drug Administration adopted a rule in 1997 that requires at least 0.75 grams of soluble fiber per serving in any product that bears a health claim associating its oat content with a reduced risk of heart disease.

==== Coeliac disease ====
Coeliac disease (celiac disease in American English) is a permanent autoimmune disease triggered by gluten proteins. It almost always occurs in genetically predisposed people, having a prevalence of about 1% in the developed world. Oat products are frequently contaminated by other gluten-containing grains, mainly wheat and barley, requiring caution in the use of oats if people are sensitive to the gluten in those grains. For example, oat bread often contains only a small proportion of oats alongside wheat or other cereals. Use of pure oats in a gluten-free diet offers improved nutritional value, but remains controversial because a small proportion of people with coeliac disease react to pure oats.

== Uses ==
=== As food ===
When used in foods, oats are most commonly rolled or crushed into oatmeal or ground into fine oat flour. Oatmeal is chiefly eaten as porridge, but may also be used in a variety of baked goods, such as oatcakes (which may be made with coarse steel-cut oats for a rougher texture), oatmeal cookies and oat bread. Oats are an ingredient in many cold cereals, in particular muesli and granola; the Quaker Oats Company introduced instant oatmeal in 1966. Oats are also used to produce milk substitutes ("oat milk"). As of late 2020, the oat milk market became the second-largest among plant milks in the United States, following almond milk, but exceeding the sales of soy milk. As a mainstay of West Wales for centuries, until changes in farming practices in the 1960s, oats were used in many traditional Welsh dishes, including laverbread, a Welsh breakfast, and "cockles and eggs" served with oatbread. Oat noodles have traditionally been eaten in Shanxi, China.

In Britain, oats are sometimes used for brewing beer, such as oatmeal stout where a percentage of oats, often 30%, is added to the barley for the wort. Oatmeal caudle, made of ale and oatmeal with spices, was a traditional British drink and a favourite of Oliver Cromwell.

The United States saw a surge in consumption of oats in the late 1980s, after the Quaker Oats Company began to promote its products as having cholesterol-reducing benefits on the basis of a 1986 study. This "oat bran fad" lasted until 1990, when newer studies cast doubt on the earlier findings.

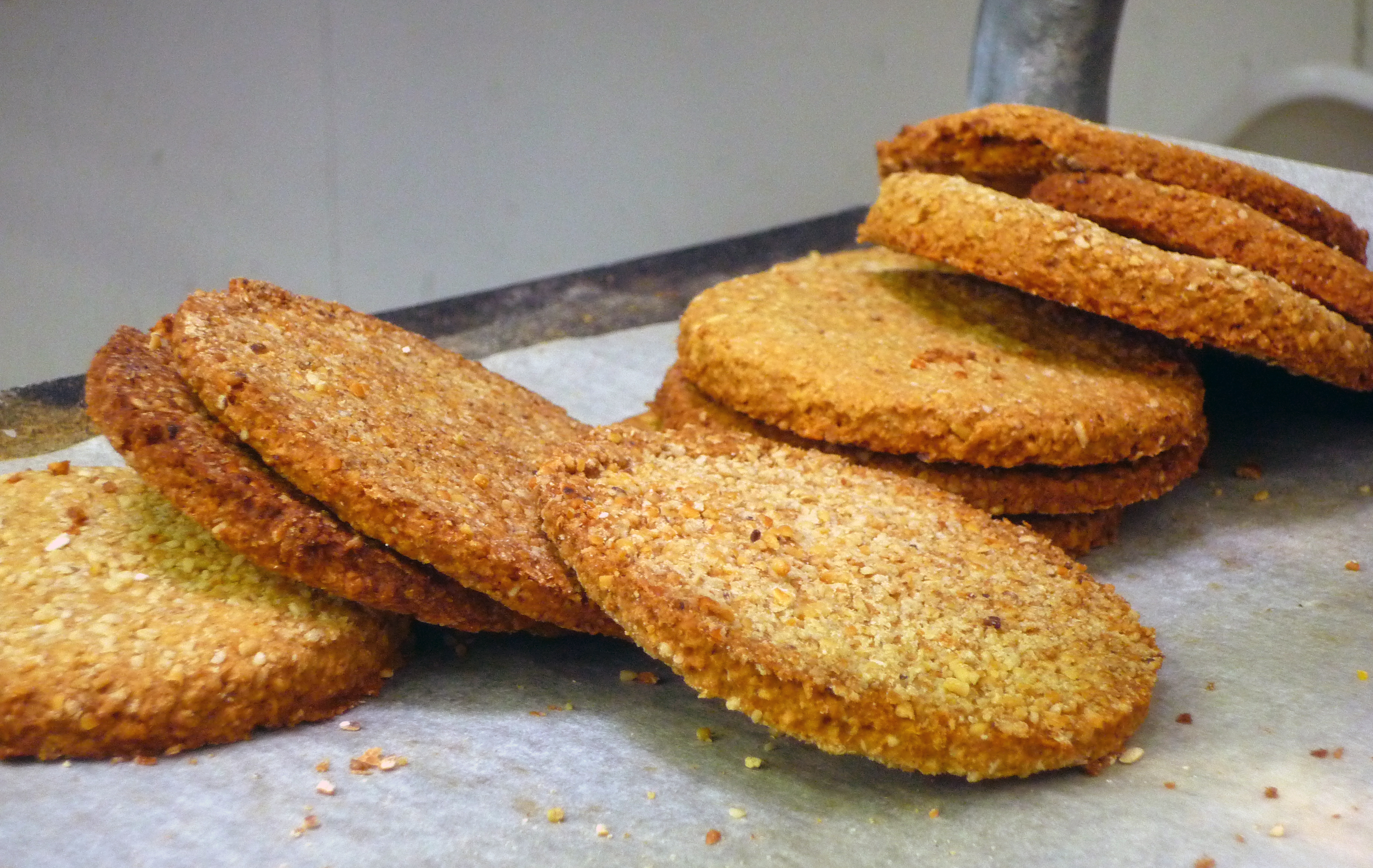
Oatcakes

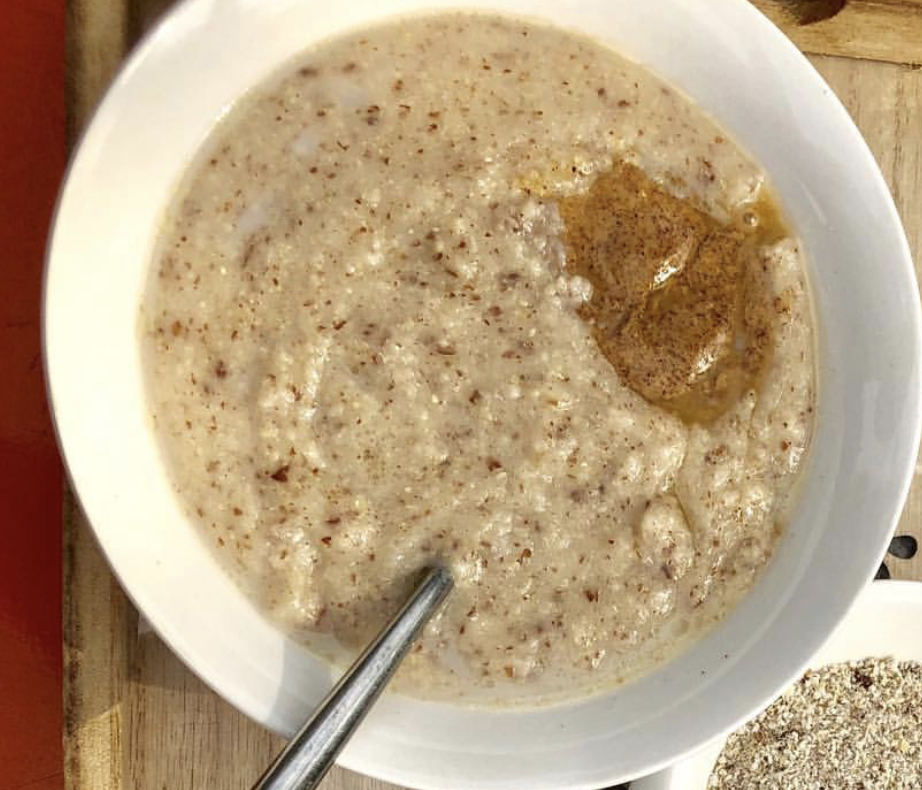
Porridge

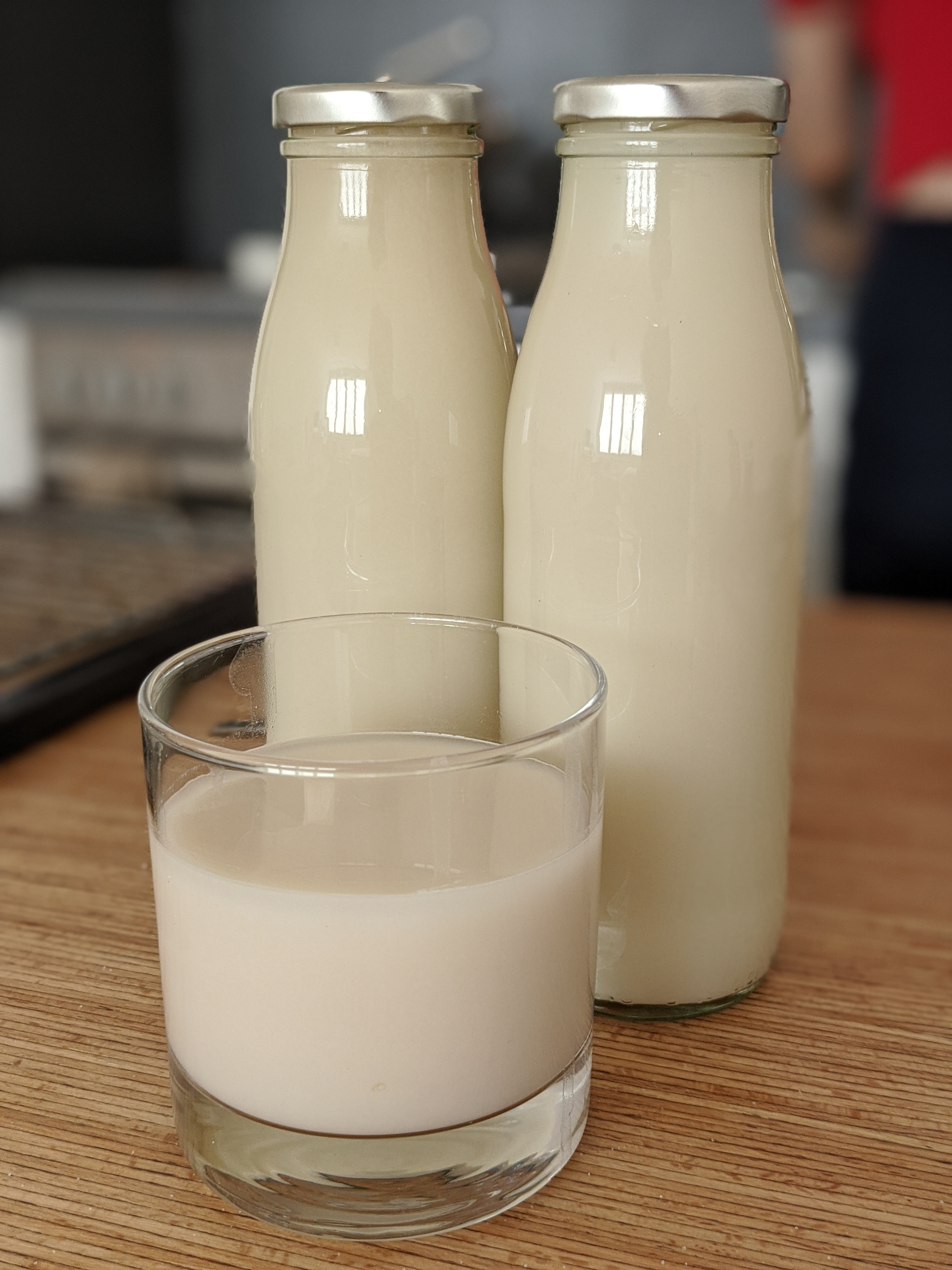
Oat milk

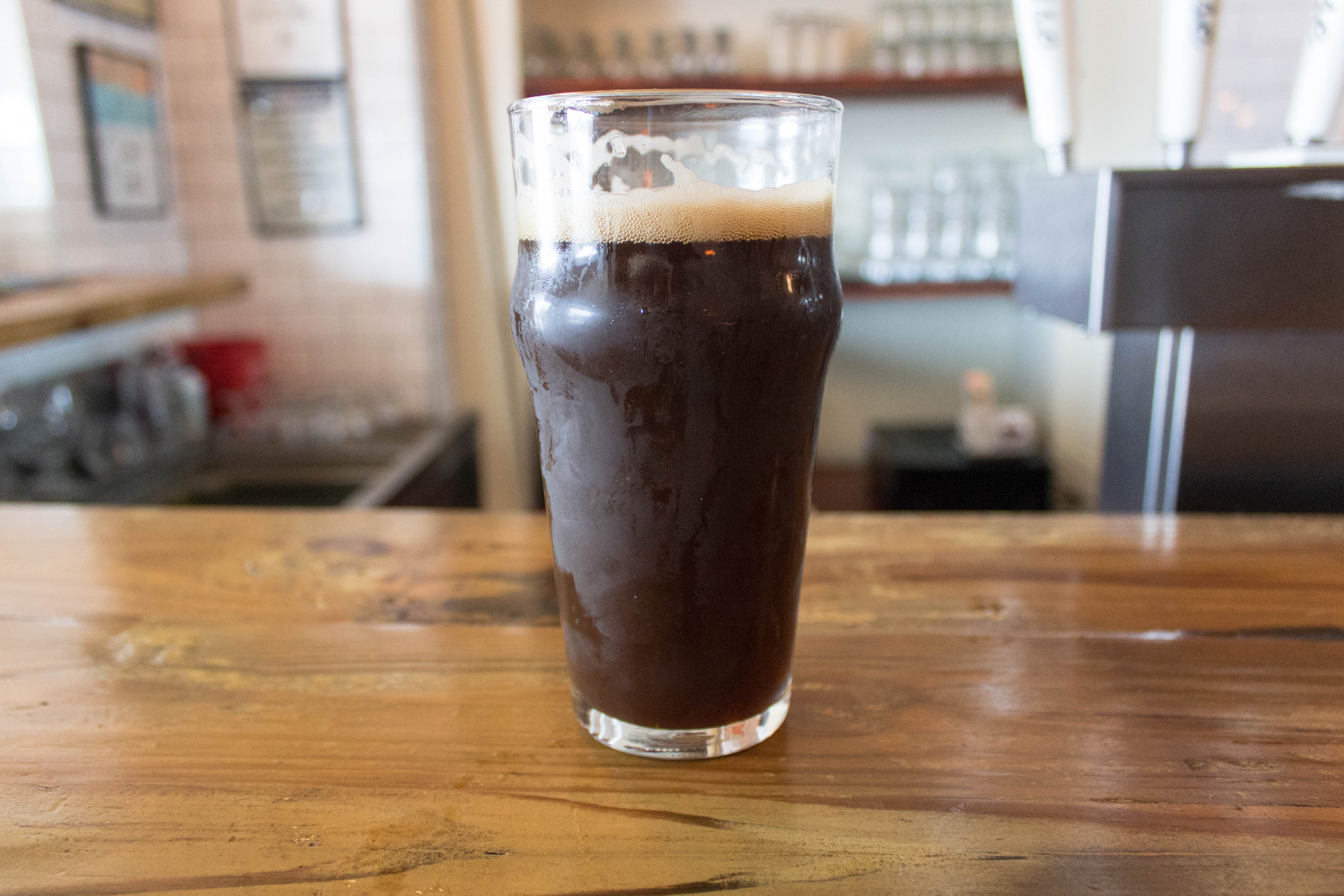
Oatmeal stout

=== Animal feed ===
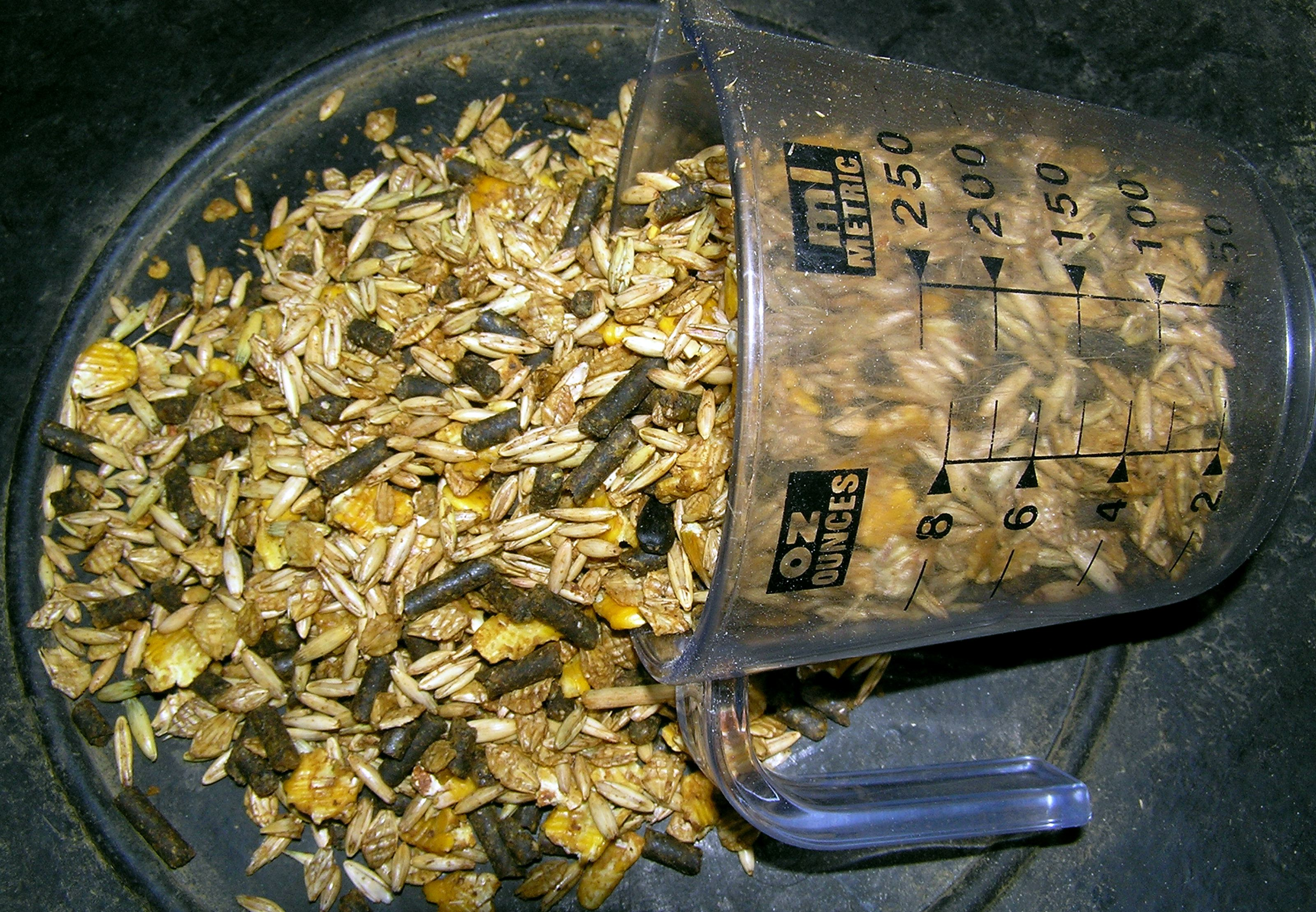
A commercially prepared grain mix for horses, with crimped maize, oats, and barley mixed with molasses and pelleted supplement

Oats are commonly used as feed for horses when extra carbohydrates and the subsequent boost in energy are required. The oat hull may be crushed ("rolled" or "crimped") to make them easier to digest, or may be fed whole. They may be given alone or as part of a blended food pellet. Cattle are also fed oats, either whole or ground into a coarse flour using a roller mill, burr mill, or hammermill. Oat forage is commonly used to feed all kinds of ruminants, as pasture, straw, hay or silage.

=== Ground cover ===
Winter oats may be grown as an off-season groundcover and ploughed under in the spring as a green fertilizer, or harvested in early summer. They also can be used for pasture; they can be grazed a while, then allowed to head out for grain production, or grazed continuously until other pastures are ready.

=== Other uses ===
Oat straw is used as animal bedding; it absorbs liquids better than wheat straw. The straw can be used for making corn dollies, small decorative woven figures. Tied in a muslin bag, oat straw has been used to soften bath water.

In biotechnology, oat-derived proteins such as LOV-domains have been used as the basis for technologies including quantum sensors and fluorescent reporters..

Furfural, a chemical used for manufacturing nylon, is obtained from oat hulls.

== In human culture ==
Oats have been eaten in Britain since the Iron Age. Production and consumption was long concentrated in Scotland even as oats were cultivated elsewhere. In the 16th and 17th centuries, as the emergence of alternative food sources meant the English were less reliant on oats for sustenance, oats began to be regarded as a mark of inferiority. In his 1755 Dictionary of the English Language, Samuel Johnson defined oats as "A grain, which in England is generally given to horses, but in Scotland supports the people."

"Oats and Beans and Barley Grow" is the first line of a traditional folksong (1380 in the Roud Folk Song Index), recorded in different forms from 1870. Similar songs are recorded from France, Canada, Belgium, Sweden, and Italy.

In English, oats are associated with sexual intercourse, as in the idioms "sowing one's (wild) oats", meaning having many sexual partners in one's youth, and "getting your oats", meaning having sex regularly.
