= Mixed-linkage glucan =

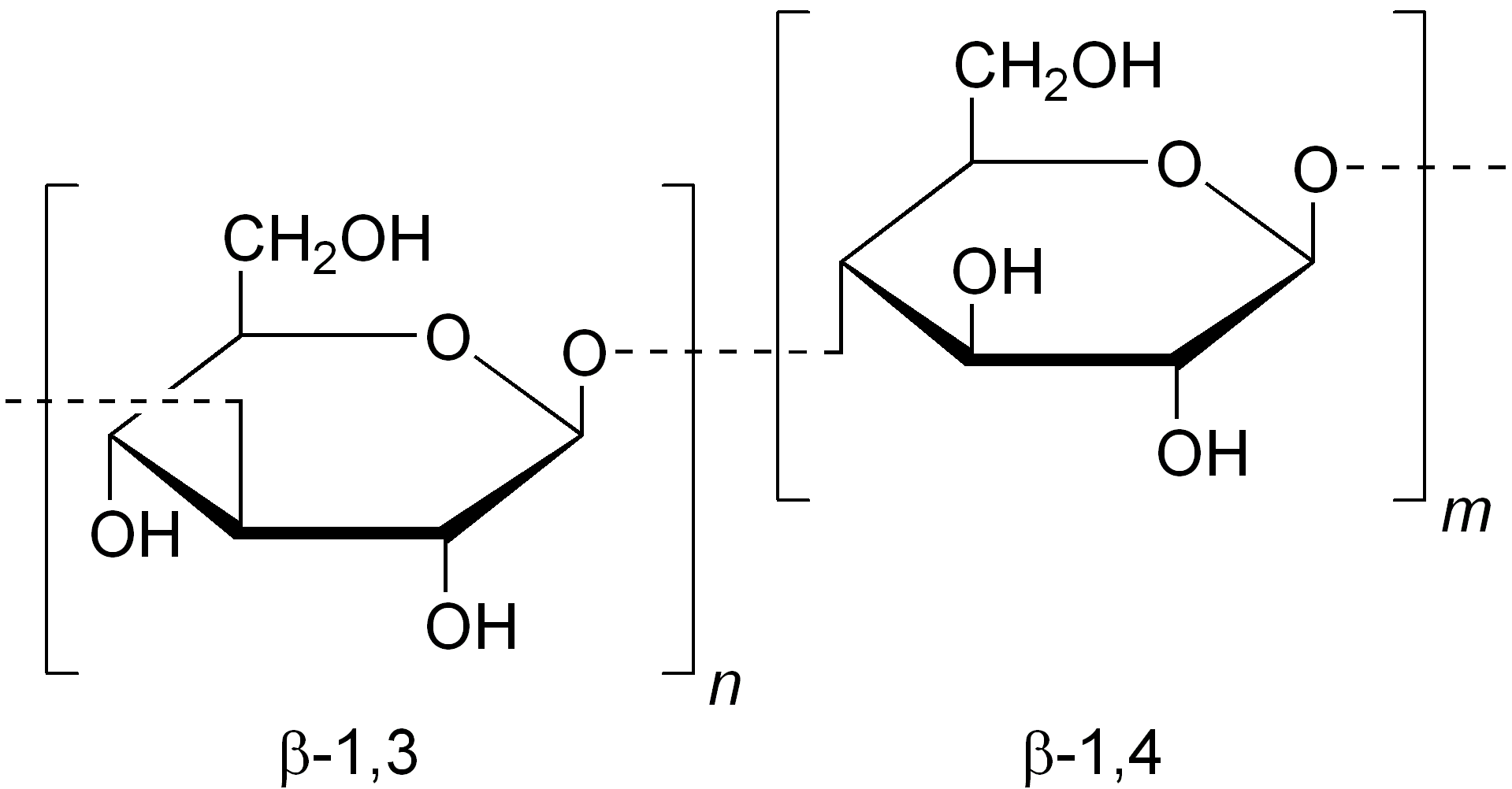
β-D(1-3) and β-D(1-4) linkages

Mixed-linkage glucan (MLG) is a hemicellulosic polysaccharide, a homopolymer of glucose connected by β-D(1-3) and β-D(1-4) glycosidic bonds. It is a type of beta-glucan and is occasionally vaguely called beta-glucan in industrial contexts. MLG is highly prevalent within the Poales (which includes the cereals), where it has important properties in the diet.

In addition, although thought to be confined to the Poales, MLG has been found to be highly prevalent in plants of the distantly related genus Equisetum.

== Structure ==
Glucose molecule, showing carbon numbering notation and beta orientation. In mixed linkage glucan bonds form only on carbons 1, 3 and 4.

MLG is composed of β-D(1-3) and β-D(1-4)-linked glucosyl residues. Typically there are regions of 2-5 β-D(1-4)-linked residues separated by β-D(1-3)-linkages. The β-D(1-4)-linked residues form rigid regions of the structure while the β-D(1-3)-links are flexible.

== Roles in the diet ==
MLGs exhibit the physiological properties of dietary fibres and the functional properties of viscous and gel-forming food hydrocolloids.

The US FDA has approved a health claim for oat beta-glucan, an MLG. "Intake of at least 3 g of β-glucan from oats per day, as part of a diet low in saturated fat and cholesterol, may reduce the risk of heart disease."

== Functions in plants ==
MLG is found in the "type II" cell walls of the Poales as a structural element, with the synthesis at its peak during cell elongation. Type II cell walls are marked by the use of glucuronoarabinoxylan (GAX) instead of "type I" xyloglucan (XG) for cross-linking. Cell wall MLG is largely hydrolyzed away once elongation has ceased. It is also present as a storage polymer in the endosperm.

MLG in Equisetum is found in the cell wall, but the type of cell wall they are found in is rich in neither GAX or XG – neither type II or type I. These cells walls are rich in pectin, however. This suggests a possible different role compared to MLG in Poales. Equiseta do express an the enzyme mixed-linkage glucan : xyloglucan endotransglucosylase (MXE), which grafts MLG to XG and probably increases cell wall strength as the plant ages.

== See also ==
- Lichenin
