= Flapjack (oat bar) =

Oat bar made with butter, sugar & syrup

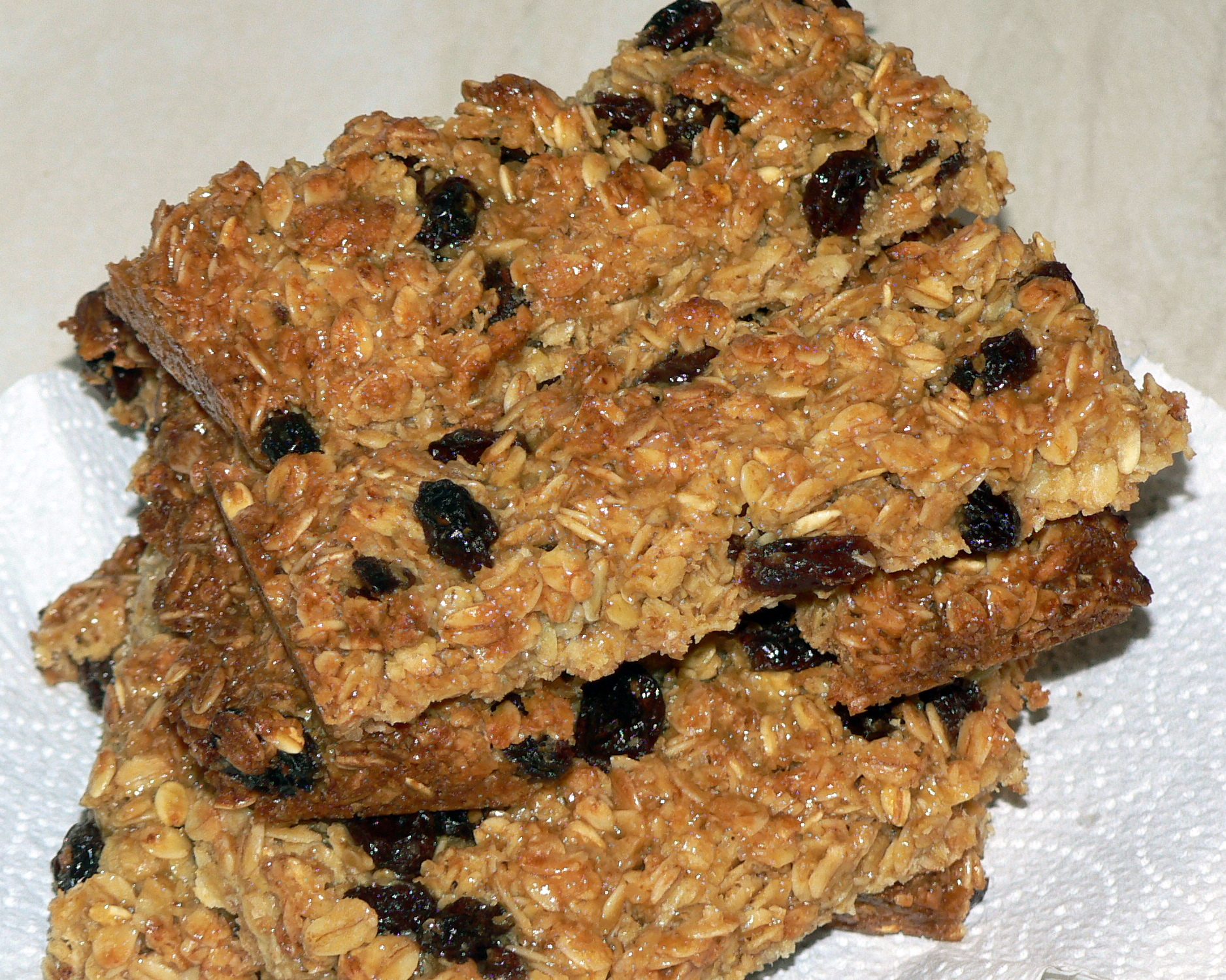
- Flapjacks with added currants
- Type: Dessert bar
- Place of origin: United Kingdom
- Main ingredients: Rolled oats, butter, brown sugar, golden syrup/honey

A flapjack (also known as a cereal bar, oat bar or oat slice) is a baked bar, cooked in a flat oven tin and cut into squares or rectangles, made from rolled oats, fat (typically butter), brown sugar and usually golden syrup. Flapjacks are similar to granola bars.

== Varieties ==
As well as being baked at home, they are widely available in shops, ready-packaged, often with extra ingredients such as chocolate, dried fruit such as glace cherries, nuts, yoghurt and toffee pieces or coatings, either as individual servings or full unsliced trayfuls. Some flapjacks may contain maple syrup. They are usually an alternative to a biscuit or cake, and textures range from soft and moist to dry and crisp. Because of the high levels of fat and calories in traditional recipes, some "diet" versions are available with lower fat and calorie content.

== History ==
The Oxford English Dictionary records the word "flapjack" being used as early as the beginning of the 16th century, although at this time it seems to have been a flat tart. Shakespeare refers to "flap-jacks" in Pericles, Prince of Tyre, but this is one of the many anachronisms in his historical plays and does not suggest that he thought it was a Middle Eastern dish, merely a common English dessert of the time:

Come, thou shant go home, and we'll have flesh for holidays, fish for fasting-days, and moreo'er puddings and flap-jacks, and thou shalt be welcome.

— Pericles, Prince of Tyre, Act II Scene I

Later, flapjack would be used to describe something similar to an apple flan, but it is not until 1935 that the word is first used to describe a food made of oats.

== Name ==
The food is called a flapjack in the United Kingdom, the Isle of Man, Ireland, and Newfoundland. In other English-speaking countries, the same item is called by different names, such as cereal bar, oat bar or (in Australia and New Zealand) oat slice.

In the United States and Canada, "flapjack" is a synonym for pancake.

== See also ==
- Parkin (cake)
