= Endotransglucosylase =

An endotransglucosylase is an enzyme which is able to transfer a saccharide unit from one saccharide to another.
