= Rolled oats =

Food made from oat groats

Rolled oats, dry
Nutritional value per 100 g (3.5 oz)
- Energy: 379 kcal (1,590 kJ)
- Carbohydrates: 67.70 g
- Sugars: 0.99 g
- Dietary fiber: 10.1 g
- Fat: 6.52 g
- Protein: 13.15 g
Vitamins and minerals
Vitamins	Quantity %DV^{†}
Vitamin A equiv.	0% 0 μg
Thiamine (B1)	38% 0.460 mg
Riboflavin (B2)	12% 0.155 mg
Niacin (B3)	7% 1.125 mg
Pantothenic acid (B5)	22% 1.120 mg
Vitamin B6	6% 0.1 mg
Folate (B9)	8% 32 μg
Vitamin B12	0% 0.00 μg
Choline	7% 40.4 mg
Vitamin C	0% 0 mg
Vitamin D	0% 0 μg
Vitamin E	3% 0.42 mg
Vitamin K	2% 2.0 μg
Minerals	Quantity %DV^{†}
Calcium	4% 52 mg
Iron	24% 4.25 mg
Magnesium	33% 138 mg
Manganese	158% 3.630 mg
Phosphorus	33% 410 mg
Potassium	12% 362 mg
Sodium	0% 6 mg
Zinc	33% 3.64 mg
- Other constituents: Quantity
- β-glucan (soluble fibre): 4 g
- Full Link to USDA Database entry
- ^{†}Percentages estimated using US recommendations for adults, except for potassium, which is estimated based on expert recommendation from the National Academies.

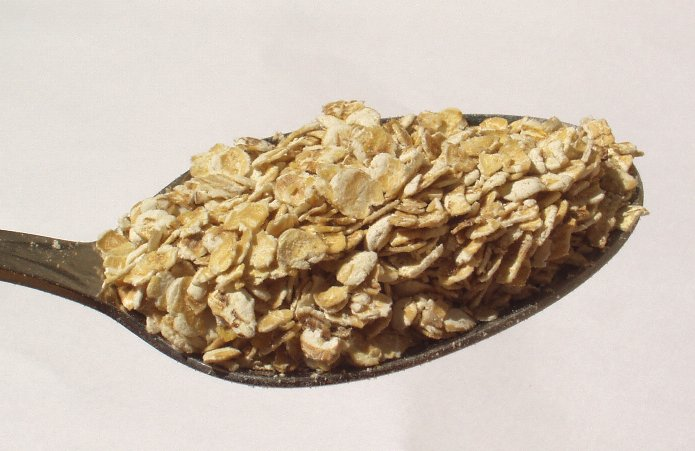
A tablespoon of rolled oats

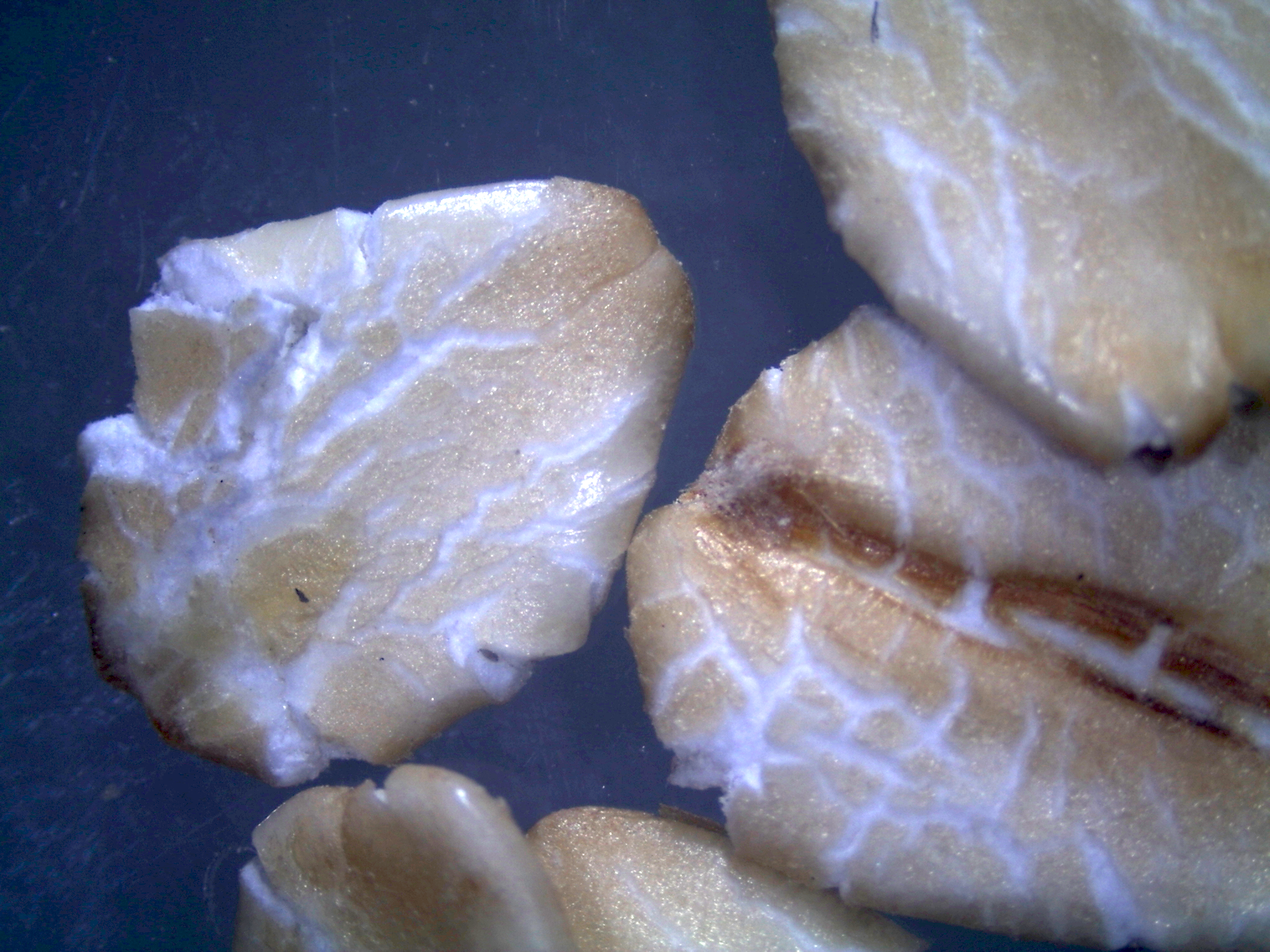
Close-up

Rolled oats are a type of lightly processed whole-grain food. They are made from oat groats that have been dehusked and steamed, before being rolled into flat flakes under heavy rollers and then stabilized by being lightly toasted.

Thick-rolled oats, or old-fashioned oats, usually remain unbroken during processing. Rolled whole oats, without further processing, can be cooked into a porridge and eaten as oatmeal; when the oats are rolled thinner and steam-cooked more in the factory, these thin-rolled oats often become fragmented but they later will absorb water more easily and cook faster into a porridge; when processed this way, they sometimes are marketed as "quick" or "instant" oats.

Rolled oats are most often the main ingredient in granola and muesli. They can be processed further into a coarse powder, which breaks down to nearly a liquid consistency when boiled. Cooked oatmeal powder is often used as baby food.

== Process ==
The oat, like other cereals, has a hard, inedible outer husk that must be removed before the grain can be eaten. After the outer husk (or chaff) has been removed from the still bran-covered oat grains, the remainder is called oat groats. Since the bran layer, though nutritious, makes the grains tougher to chew and contains an enzyme that can cause the oats to go rancid, raw oat groats are often further steam-treated to soften them for a quicker cooking time and to denature the enzymes for a longer shelf life.

Steel-cut oats (sometimes called "pinhead oats", especially if cut small) are oat groats that have been chopped by a sharp-bladed machine before any steaming, and thus retain bits of the bran layer.

== Preparation ==
Rolled oats can be eaten without further heating or cooking, if they are soaked for one to six hours in water-based liquid, such as water, milk, or plant-based dairy substitutes. The required soaking duration depends on shape, size and pre-processing technique.

Whole oat groats can be cooked as a breakfast cereal in the same general way as the various forms of oatmeal, rolled oats, and pinhead oats; they simply take longer to cook. Rolled oats are used in granola, muesli, oatcakes, and flapjacks (the style of "flapjack" that is like a granola bar, not a pancake).

== Nutrients ==
Whole oats (uncooked) are 68% carbohydrates, 6% fat, and 13% protein (table). In a 100-gram reference amount, whole oats supply 379 calories and contain high amounts (20% or more the Daily Value, DV) of the B vitamins – thiamine and pantothenic acid (40% and 22% DV, respectively) – and several dietary minerals, especially manganese (173% DV) and phosphorus (59% DV). As a rich source of dietary fiber (10 grams per 100 gram serving), whole oats supply beta-glucan (4 grams per 100 gram serving; table), a soluble fiber with cholesterol-lowering effects.

== See also ==
- Flattened rice – Type of rice dish
- Oat bran – Hard outer layers of cereal grain
- Oat milk – Type of plant milk made from oats
