= Oat beta-glucan =

Polysaccharide

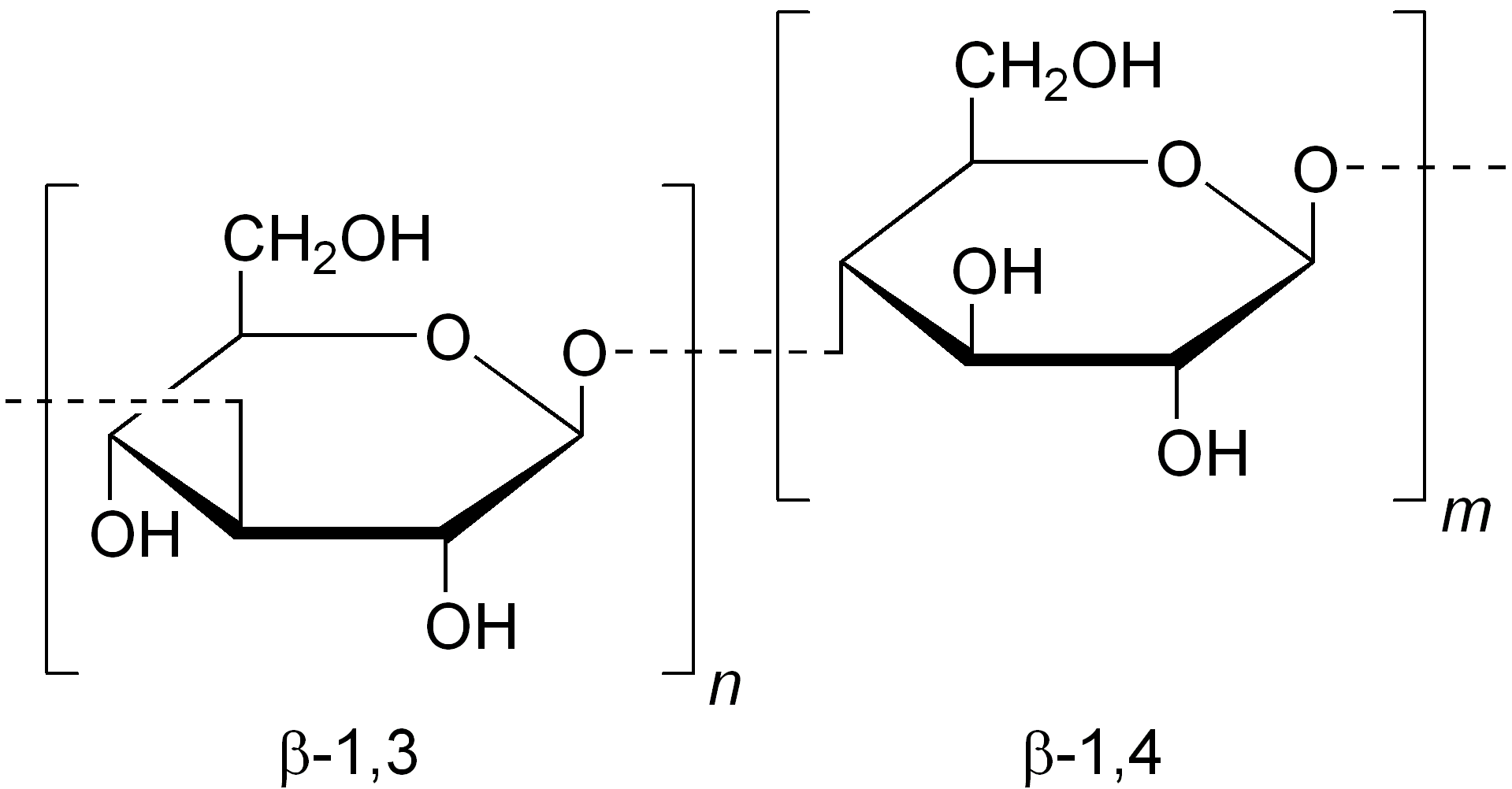
Oat β-glucan repeat structure

Oat β-glucans are water-soluble mixed-linkage β-glucans derived from the endosperm of oat kernels known for their dietary contribution as components of soluble fiber. Due to their property to lower serum total cholesterol and low-density lipoprotein cholesterol, and potentially reduce the risk of cardiovascular diseases, oat β-glucans have been assigned a qualified health claim by the European Food Safety Authority and the US Food and Drug Administration.

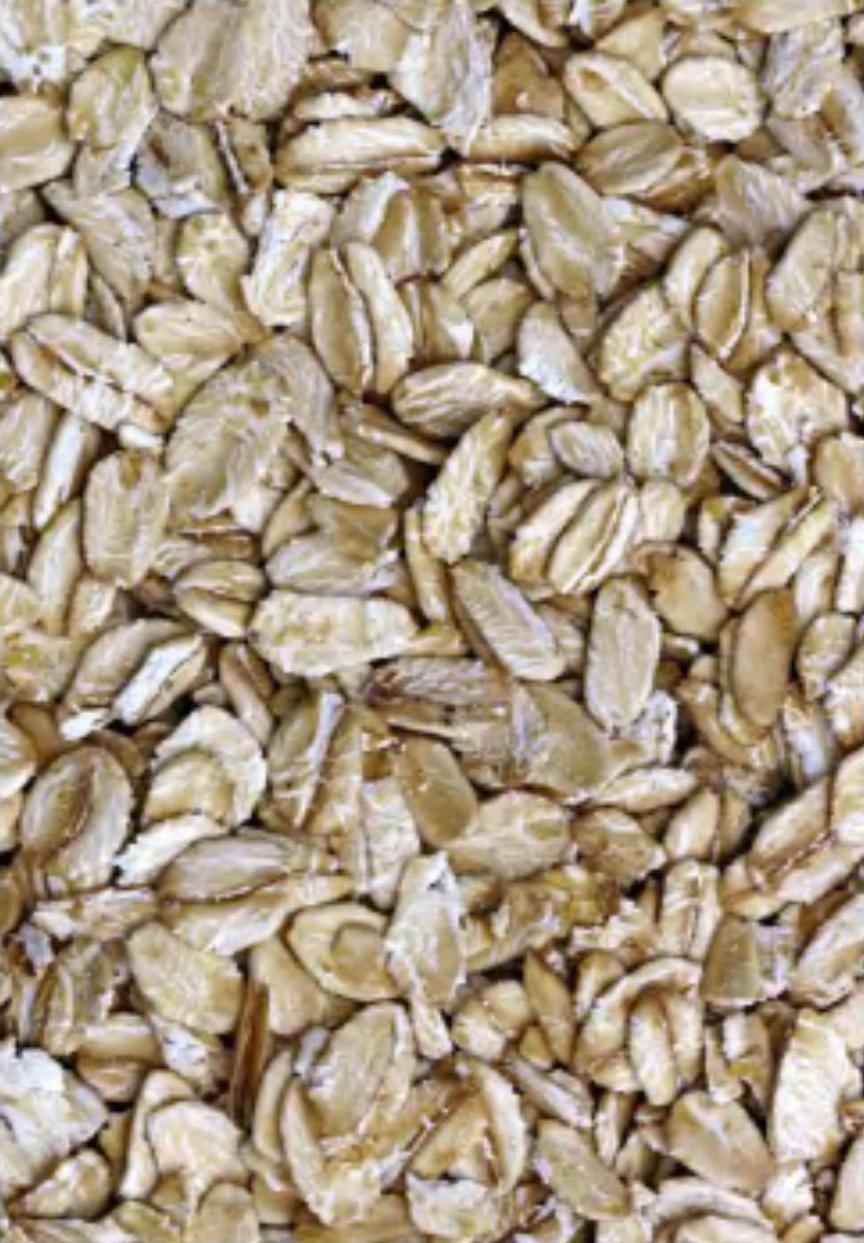
Oat flakes used for making common oatmeal products

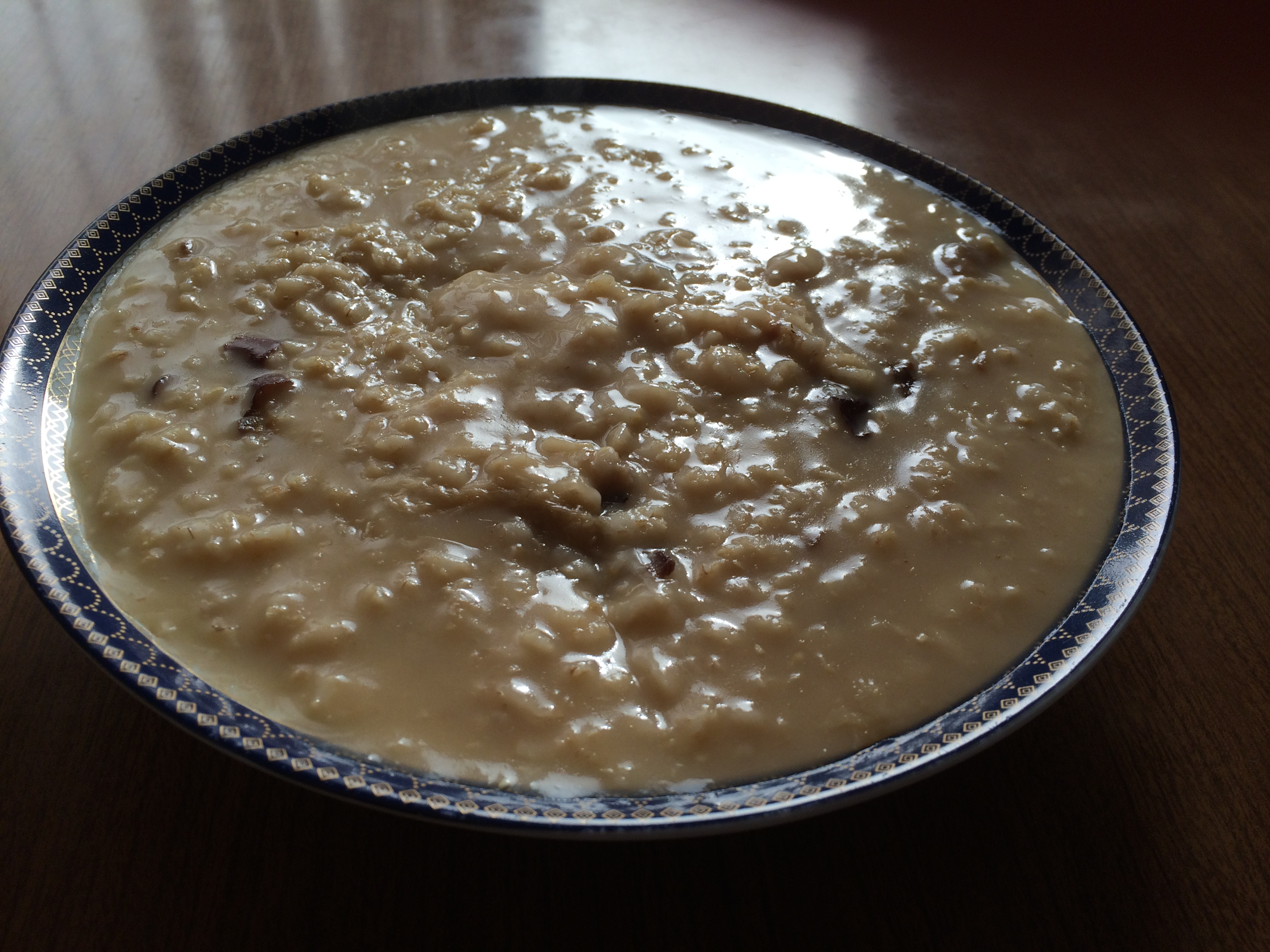
A bowl of oatmeal, a common food source of beta-glucans

== History ==
Oat products have been used for centuries for medicinal and cosmetic purposes; however, the specific role of β-glucan was not explored until the 20th century. β-glucans were first discovered in lichens, and shortly thereafter in barley. After joining Agriculture and Agri-Food Canada in 1969, Peter J Wood played an instrumental role in isolating and characterizing the structure and bioactive properties of oat β-glucan. A public interest in oat β-glucan arose after its cholesterol lowering effect was reported in 1984.

In 1997, after reviewing 33 clinical studies performed over the previous decades, the FDA approved the claim that intake of at least 3 g of β-glucan from oats per day "as part of a diet low in saturated fat and cholesterol, may reduce the risk of heart disease." This marked the first time a public health agency claimed dietary intervention can actually help prevent disease. This health claim mobilized a dietary movement as physicians and dietitians for the first time could recommend intake of a specific food to directly combat disease. Since then, oat consumption has continued to gain traction in disease prevention with noted effects on ischemic heart disease and stroke prevention, but also in other areas like BMI reduction, blood pressure lowering and highly corroborated evidence for reduced blood serum cholesterol.

== Structural properties ==
Cereal β-glucans – including β-glucan from oat, barley and wheat – are linear polysaccharides joined by 1,3 and 1,4 carbon linkages. The majority of cereal β-glucan bonds consist of 3 or 4 beta-1,4 glycosidic bonds (trimers and tetramers) interconnected by 1,3 linkages. In β-glucan, these trimers and tetramers are known as cellotriosyl and cellotetraosyl. Oats and barley differ in the ratio of cellotriosyl to cellotetraosyl, and barley has more 1-4 linkages with a degree of polymerization higher than 4. In oats, β-glucan is found mainly in the endosperm of the oat kernel, especially in the outer layers of that endosperm (a marked difference from barley, which contains β-glucan uniformly throughout the endosperm).

Most oats contain 3–6% β-glucan by weight. Oats can be selectively bred based on favourable β-glucan levels. Often millers only process oat cultivars with at least 4% by weight β-glucan. Oat β-glucans are linear and linked at the 1,3 and 1,4 carbon sites.

Oat β-glucans can form into a random coil structure and flow with Newtonian behaviour until they reach a critical concentration at which point they become pseudoplastic. The gelling ability of oat β-glucan correlates to the percentage of trimers.

== Extraction ==
β-glucan extraction from oat can be difficult due to tendency of depolymerization – which often occurs in high pH. Thus β-glucan extraction is usually performed under a more neutral pH and generally at temperatures of 60–100 °C (140–212 °F). Usually β-glucan is solubilized in the extraction process with residual starch, which is then removed by hydrolysis with alpha-amylase. The residual solution usually contains coextracts of hemicelluloses and proteins which can then be separated through selective precipitation. Through wet milling, sieving, and solvent-extraction, oat beta-glucans can achieve up to 95% extraction purity.

== Viscosity of oat β-glucan ==
In oats, β-glucan makes up the majority of the soluble fibre; however, oat β-glucans do become insoluble above a certain concentration. The total viscosity is determined by the level of solubility, the molecular weight, and the trimer-to-tetramer ratio. The lower the trimer-tetramer ratio, the higher the β-glucan viscosity in solution. A more viscous internal β-glucan solution generally leads to beneficial physiological effects – including a more pronounced hypoglycemic effect and lowered cholesterol levels, and a decrease in postprandial blood glucose levels.

== Physiological effects ==
=== As fermentable fiber ===
In the diet, β-glucans are a source of soluble, fermentable fiber – also called prebiotic fiber – which provides a substrate for microbiota within the large intestine, increasing fecal bulk and producing short-chain fatty acids as byproducts with wide-ranging physiological activities. This fermentation impacts the expression of many genes within the large intestine, which further affects digestive function and cholesterol and glucose metabolism, as well as the immune system and other systemic functions.

=== Cholesterol ===
In 1997, the FDA recognized the cholesterol lowering effect of oat β-glucan. In Europe, several health claim requests were submitted to the EFSA NDA Panel (Dietetic Products, Nutrition and Allergies), related to the role of β-glucans in maintenance of normal blood cholesterol concentrations and maintenance or achievement of a normal body weight. In July 2009, the Scientific Committee issued the following statements:

- On the basis of the data available, the Panel concludes that a cause-and-effect relationship has been established between the consumption of beta-glucans and the "reduction of blood cholesterol concentrations."
- The following wording reflects the scientific evidence: "Regular consumption of beta-glucans contributes to maintenance of normal blood cholesterol concentrations." In order to bear the claim, foods should provide at least 3 g/d of beta-glucans from oats, oat bran, barley, barley bran, or mixtures of non-processed or minimally processed beta-glucans in one or more servings. The target population is adults with normal or mildly elevated blood cholesterol concentrations.

In November 2011, the EU Commission published its decision in favour of oat beta-glucans with regard to Article 14 of the EC Regulation on the labelling of foodstuffs with nutrition and health claim statements permitting oat beta-glucan to be described as beneficial to health. Following the opinion of the Panel on Dietetic Products, Nutrition and Allergies (NDA) the EFSA and the Regulation (EU) no. 1160/2011 of the Commission, foodstuffs through which 3 g/day of oat beta-glucan are consumed (1 g of oat beta-glucan per portion) are allowed to display the following health claim: "Oat beta-glucan reduces the cholesterol level in the blood. The lowering of the blood cholesterol level can reduce the risk of coronary heart disease."

β-glucan lowers cholesterol in part by increasing the viscosity of digesta in the small intestine, although cholesterol reduction is greater in those with higher total cholesterol and LDL cholesterol in their blood. Additionally, studies suggest that it increases the activity of CYP7A1, a key enzyme in the synthesis of bile acids, thus increasing the excretion of cholesterol, and that it may have additional anti-atherogenic mechanisms. The degree of cholesterol reduction depends upon the particular strain of β-glucan in a range between a molecular weights of 26.8 and 3000 kD. Although more viscous β-glucans result in a more viscous solution of intestinal digesta, and thus more cholesterol uptake, after a certain molecular weight, β-glucans become less soluble and thus contribute less to solution viscosity. The intake of β-glucan in liquid form generally results in greater solubilization and oat β-glucan is more effective at lowering cholesterol in juices than in hard foods like bread and cookies. Despite the recognized impact of viscosity on serum cholesterol levels, no current data exists comparing internal solution viscosity and serum cholesterol.

Intake of oat β-glucan at daily amounts of at least 3 grams lowers total and low-density lipoprotein cholesterol levels by 5–10% in people with normal or elevated blood cholesterol levels.

=== Digestion ===
Throughout digestion, β-glucan alters the physical properties of digesta while chemicals in the digestive tract break down β-glucan, changing its composition. Fermentation of β-glucans by microbiote results in the production of short chain fatty acids and changes to gut microbes as well as the depolymerization and structural change of the original β-glucan. In the stomach, β-glucans swell and cause gastric distension – which is associated with the signal pathway of satiation – the feeling of fullness, leading to a decreased appetite. Studies demonstrating β-glucan's effect on delayed gastric emptying may differ due to variants in food combination, β-glucan dosage, and molecular weight, and variety of food source. In the small intestine, β-glucan may reduce starch digestibility and glucose uptake – significant in the reduction of postprandial glucose levels.

Oat β-glucans have a prebiotic effect where they selectively stimulate growth of specific strands of microbes in the colon, where the particular microbe stimulated depends on the degree of polymerization of the β-glucan. Specifically, Lactobacillus and Enterococcus are stimulated by all oat β-glucan while Bifidobacterium bacteria also stimulated by oat β-glucan oligosaccharides. Soluble β-glucan increases stool weight through the increase in microbial cells in the colon.

=== Blood glucose ===
Postprandial blood glucose levels become lower after consumption of a meal containing β-glucan as a result of increased gut viscosity, which delays gastric emptying and lengthens travel through the small intestine. In one review, the net decrease in blood glucose absorption reduced postprandial blood insulin concentrations, improving insulin sensitivity. A 2021 meta-analysis of clinical trials concluded that oat beta-glucan with molecular weights greater than 300 kg/mol reduced incremental area-under-the-curve by 23%, peak blood glucose by 28%, and insulin by 22% in a dose-responsive fashion, with similar results in participants with or without diabetes. Diabetic people who increased their daily consumption of beta-glucans by more than 3 grams per day for months also lost body weight.

=== Cosmetics ===
β-glucan is used in a variety of creams, ointments and powders with potential to affect collagen production and skin disorders.

=== Wound healing and immunomodulation ===
In preliminary research, oat β-glucan is being studied for its potential immunomodulatory effects, antitumour properties, and stimulation of collagen deposition, tissue granulation, reepithelization, and macrophage infiltration in the wound healing process.
