= Hemicellulose =

Class of plant cell wall polysaccharides

A hemicellulose (also known as polyose) is one of a number of heteropolymers (matrix polysaccharides), such as arabinoxylans, present along with cellulose in almost all terrestrial plant cell walls. Cellulose is crystalline, strong, and resistant to hydrolysis. Hemicelluloses are branched, shorter in length than cellulose, and also show a propensity to crystallize. They can be hydrolyzed by dilute acid, base, or hemicellulase enzymes.

== Composition ==
Diverse kinds of hemicelluloses are known. Important examples include xylan, glucuronoxylan, arabinoxylan, glucomannan, and xyloglucan.

Hemicelluloses are polysaccharides often associated with cellulose, but with distinct compositions and structures. Whereas cellulose is derived exclusively from glucose, hemicelluloses are composed of diverse sugars, and can include the five-carbon sugars xylose and arabinose, the six-carbon sugars glucose, mannose and galactose, and the six-carbon deoxy sugar fucose. Hemicelluloses contain most of the D-pentose sugars, and occasionally small amounts of L-sugars as well. Xylose is in most cases the sugar monomer present in the largest amount, although in softwoods mannose can be the most abundant sugar. Not only regular sugars can be found in hemicellulose, but also their acidified forms, for instance glucuronic acid can be present.

== Structural comparison to cellulose ==
Unlike cellulose, hemicelluloses consist of shorter chains – 500–3,000 sugar units. In contrast, each polymer of cellulose comprises 7,000–15,000 glucose molecules. In addition, hemicelluloses may be branched polymers, while cellulose is unbranched. Hemicelluloses are embedded in the cell walls of plants, sometimes in chains that form a 'ground' – they bind with pectin to cellulose to form a network of cross-linked fibres.

Section of a cell wall; hemicellulose in green

Based on the structural difference, like backbone linkages and side groups, as well as other factors, like abundance and distributions in plants, hemicelluloses can be categorized into four groups as following: 1) xylans, 2) mannans; 3) mixed linkage β-glucans; 4) xyloglucans.

=== Xylans ===
Xylans usually consist of a backbone of β-(1→4)-linked xylose residues and can be further divided into homoxylans and heteroxylans. Homoxylans have a backbone of D-xylopyranose residues linked by β(1→4) glycosidic linkages. Homoxylans mainly have structural functions. Heteroxylans such as glucuronoxylans, glucuronoarabinoxylans, and complex heteroxylans, have a backbone of D-xylopyranose and short carbohydrate branches. For example, glucuronoxylan has a substitution with α-(1→2)-linked glucuronosyl and 4-O-methyl glucuronosyl residues. Arabinoxylans and glucuronoarabinoxylans contain arabinose residues attached to the backbone

Xylan in hardwood

=== Mannans ===
The mannan-type hemicellulose can be classified into two types based on their main chain difference, galactomannans and glucomannans. Galactomannans have only β-(1→4) linked D-mannopyranose residues in linear chains. Glucomannans consist of both β-(1→4) linked D-mannopyranose and β-(1→4) linked D-glucopyranose residues in the main chains. As for the side chains, D-galactopyranose residues tend to be 6-linked to both types as the single side chains with various amount.

=== Mixed linkage β-glucans ===
The conformation of the mixed linkage glucan chains usually contains blocks of β-(1→4) D-Glucopyranose separated by single β-(1→3) D-Glucopyranose. The population of β-(1→4) and β-(1→3) are about 70% and 30%. These glucans primarily consist of cellotriosyl (C_{18}H_{32}O_{16}) and cellotraosyl (C_{24}H_{42}O_{21})segments in random order. There are some study show the molar ratio of cellotriosyl/cellotraosyl for oat (2.1-2.4), barley (2.8-3.3), and wheat (4.2-4.5).

Beta-D-glucopyranose with carbon positions.

=== Xyloglucans ===
Xyloglucans have a backbone similar to cellulose with α-D-xylopyranose residues at position 6. To better describe different side chains, a single letter code notation is used for each side chain type. G -- unbranched Glc residue; X -- α-d-Xyl-(1→6)-Glc. L -- β-Gal , S -- α-l-Araf, F-- α-l-Fuc. These are the most common side chains.

The two most common types of xyloglucans in plant cell walls are identified as XXXG and XXGG.

== Biosynthesis ==
Hemicelluloses are synthesised from sugar nucleotides in the cell's Golgi apparatus. Two models explain their synthesis: 1) a '2 component model' where modification occurs at two transmembrane proteins, and 2) a '1 component model' where modification occurs only at one transmembrane protein. After synthesis, hemicelluloses are transported to the plasma membrane via Golgi vesicles.

Each kind of hemicellulose is biosynthesized by specialized enzymes.

Mannan chain backbones are synthesized by cellulose synthase-like protein family A (CSLA) and possibly enzymes in cellulose synthase-like protein family D (CSLD). Mannan synthase, a particular enzyme in CSLA, is responsible for the addition of mannose units to the backbone. The galactose side-chains of some mannans are added by galactomannan galactosyltransferase. Acetylation of mannans is mediated by a mannan O-acetyltransferase, however, this enzyme has not been definitively identified.

Xyloglucan backbone synthesis is mediated by cellulose synthase-like protein family C (CSLC), particularly glucan synthase, which adds glucose units to the chain. Backbone synthesis of xyloglucan is also mediated in some way by xylosyltransferase, but this mechanism is separate to its transferase function and remains unclear. Xylosyltransferase in its transferase function is, however, utilized for the addition of xylose to the side-chain. Other enzymes utilized for side-chain synthesis of xyloglucan include galactosyltransferase (which is responsible for the addition of [galactose and of which two different forms are utilized), fucosyltransferase (which is responsible for the addition of fucose), and acetyltransferase (which is responsible for acetylation).

Xylan backbone synthesis, unlike that of the other hemicelluloses, is not mediated by any cellulose synthase-like proteins. Instead, xylan synthase is responsible for backbone synthesis, facilitating the addition of xylose. Several genes for xylan synthases have been identified. Several other enzymes are utilized for the addition and modification of the side-chain units of xylan, including glucuronosyltransferase (which adds [glucuronic acid units), xylosyltransferase (which adds additional xylose units), arabinosyltransferase (which adds arabinose), methyltransferase (responsible for methylation), and acetyltransferase] (responsible for acetylation). Given that mixed-linkage glucan is a non-branched homopolymer of glucose, there is no side-chain synthesis, only the addition of glucose to the backbone in two linkages, β1-3 and β1-4. Backbone synthesis is mediated by enzymes in cellulose synthase-like protein families F and H (CSLF and CSLH), specifically glucan synthase. Several forms of glucan synthase from CSLF and CSLH have been identified. All of them are responsible for addition of glucose to the backbone and all are capable of producing both β1-3 and β1-4 linkages, however, it is unknown how much each specific enzyme contributes to the distribution of β1-3 and β1-4 linkages.

== Applications ==
In the sulfite pulp process, hemicellulose is largely hydrolysed by the acid pulping liquor ending up in the brown liquor where the fermentable hexose sugars (around 2%) can be used for producing ethanol. This process was primarily applied to calcium sulfite brown liquors.

Xylan
The films based on xylan show low oxygen permeability and thus are of potential interest as packaging for oxygen-sensitive products.
Mixed-linkage glucan
Mixed-linkage glucans (industrially known as 'β-glucans') have an important role in food supplements, while they also show promise in treating health-related issues, especially in immune reactions and the treatment of cancer.
Glucomannan and galactomannan
Various (gluco/galacto)mannans such as konjac, locust bean gum, and guar gum, are frequently used as food additives, where they act as thickeners, stabilisers, and emulsifiers.

Hemicellulose is also abundantly found in cereal hull/husk, bran, and straw. A number of proposed processes aim to break it down into the above-mentioned parts for utilization.

== Natural functions ==
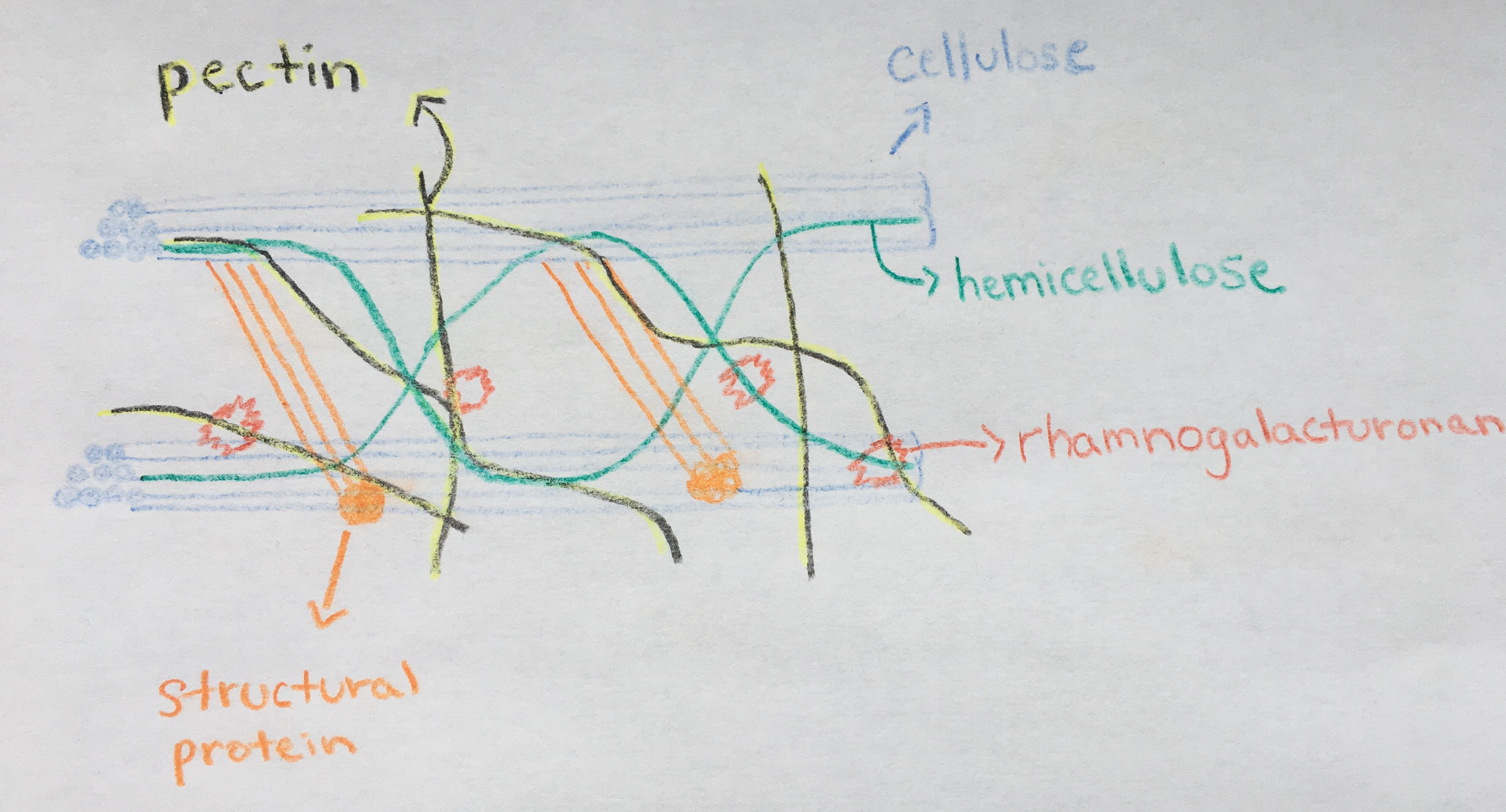
Hemicellulose contribution to structural support within plant cells

As a polysaccharide compound in plant cell walls similar to cellulose, hemicellulose helps cellulose in the strengthening of plant cell walls. Hemicellulose interacts with the cellulose by providing cross-linking of cellulose microfibrils: hemicellulose will search for voids in the cell wall during its formation and provide support around cellulose fibrils in order to equip the cell wall with the maximum possible strength it can provide. Hemicellulose dominates the middle lamella of the plant cell, unlike cellulose which is primarily found in the secondary layers. This allows for hemicellulose to provide middle-ground support for the cellulose on the outer layers of the plant cell. In few cell walls, hemicellulose will also interact with lignin to provide structural tissue support of more vascular plants.

== Extraction ==
There are many ways to obtain hemicellulose; all of these rely on extraction methods through hardwood or softwood trees milled into smaller samples. In hardwoods the main hemicellulose extract is glucuronoxlyan (acetylated xylans), while galactoglucomannan is found in softwoods. Prior to extraction the wood typically must be milled into wood chips of various sizes depending on the reactor used. Following this, a hot water extraction process, also known as autohydrolysis or hydrothermal treatment, is utilized with the addition of acids and bases to change the yield size and properties. The main advantage to hot water extraction is that it offers a method where the only chemical that is needed is water, making this environmentally friendly and cheap.

The goal of hot water treatment is to remove as much hemicellulose from the wood as possible. This is done through the hydrolysis of the hemicellulose to achieve smaller oligomers and xylose. Xylose when dehydrated becomes furfural. When xylose and furfural are the goal, acid catalysts, such as formic acid, are added to increase the transition of polysaccharide to monosaccharides. This catalyst also has been shown to also utilize a solvent effect to be aid the reaction.

One method of pretreatment is to soak the wood with diluted acids (with concentrations around 4%). This converts the hemicellulose into monosaccharides. When pretreatment is done with bases (for instance sodium or potassium hydroxide) this destroys the structure of the lignin. This changes the structure from crystalline to amorphous. Hydrothermal pretreatment is another method. This offers advantages such as no toxic or corrosive solvents are needed, nor are special reactors, and no extra costs to dispose of hazardous chemicals.

The hot water extraction process is done in batch reactors, semi-continuous reactors, or slurry continuous reactors. For batch and semi-continuous reactors wood samples can be used in conditions such as chips or pellets while a slurry reactor must have particles as small as 200 to 300 micrometers. While the particle size decreases the yield production decreases as well. This is due to the increase of cellulose.

The hot water process is operated at a temperature range of 160 to 240 degrees Celsius in order to maintain the liquid phase. This is done above the normal boiling point of water to increase the solubilization of the hemicellulose and the depolymerization of polysaccharides. This process can take several minutes to several hours depending on the temperature and pH of the system. Higher temperatures paired with higher extraction times lead to higher yields. A maximum yield is obtained at a pH of 3.5. If below, the extraction yield exponentially decreases. In order to control pH, sodium bicarbonate is generally added. The sodium bicarbonate inhibits the autolysis of acetyl groups as well as inhibiting glycosyl bonds. Depending on the temperature and time the hemicellulose can be further converted into oligomers, monomers and lignin.

Solid bits of wood remain after autohydrolysis, as the lignin is largely untouched. A proper degree of autohydrolysis can preserve the lignin well enough to be used for paper production. This is useful for the Kraft process, which normally does not recover wood hemicellulose into useful products.

== See also ==
- Cellulose
- Lignin
- Polysaccharides
