= Arabinoxylan =

Hemicellulose found in cell walls of plants

Arabinoxylan is a form of the hemicellulose xylan found in both the primary and secondary cell walls of plants which in addition to xylose contains substantial amounts of another pentose sugar, arabinose. The term arabinoxylan usually refers to feruloyl-arabinoxylan from grasses and other commelinids containing moieties of the phenolic ferulic acid that can undergo oxidative coupling (in the same way as lignin units) forming crosslinks between arabinoxylan chains and with lignin. Whilst arabinose has been found linked to xylan in non-commelinid plants, ferulic acid has not been reported on these and unlike feruloyl-arabinoxylan these arabinoxylans are not monophyletic. The remainder of this article refers to feruloyl-arabinoxylan from cell walls of grasses and other commelinid species.

== Structure ==
As with all xylan, the backbone of arabinoxylan chains is composed of a large number of 1,4-linked β-D-xylopyranosyl units. In arabinoxylan many of these xylose units are 3-linked with single α-L-arabinofuranosyl units and some of these arabinose in turn have ester-linked ferulic acid residues. These feruloyl units can undergo radical oxidative coupling forming ferulic acid dehydrodimers and possibly higher oligomers that covalently crosslink arabinoxylan chains. This mode of cross-linking is a key feature of both primary and secondary cell walls in grasses and other commelinid species.

Due to its importance in food, the structure of arabinoxylan from wheat grain and other cereals has been intensively studied. In particular, the arabinoxylan from wheat endosperm that gives rise to white flour has a simpler structure than that from most tissues. Apart from the structural features described above, it has xylose units di-substituted with 2 and 3-linked arabinose residues. Due to a low degree of crosslinking into the cell wall, some of this endosperm arabinoxylan is extractable in water, giving rise to soluble dietary fiber.

Arabinoxylans from tissues other than endosperm are structurally more complex. The xylan backbone is often heavily substituted with glucuronic acid resides and other sugars and these arabinoxylan polymers are sometimes termed glucuronarabinoxylans or heteroxylans. Both backbone and sidechain sugar residues can be acetylated. Arabinosyl residues can be acylated with phenolics other than ferulic acid, in particular p-coumaric acid but also sinapinic acid and others. These acylated arabinosyl residues are frequently additionally substituted with 2-linked sugars. In lignified cell walls, there is strong evidence that feruloyl residues on arabinoxylan can be crosslinked into the lignin polymer, increasing recalcitrance to digestion.

== Functions ==
Arabinoxylans chiefly serve a structural role in the plant cells. They are also the reservoirs of large amounts of ferulic acid and other phenolic acids which are covalently linked to them. Phenolic acids may also be involved in defense including protection against fungal pathogens.

Arabinoxylans are one of the main components of soluble and insoluble dietary fibers which are shown to exert various health benefits. In addition, arabinoxylans, owing to their bound phenolic acids, are shown to have antioxidant activity. Their ion exchange capacity and viscosity are also partly responsible for their beneficial metabolic effects.

== Modified Arabinoxylan (MGN-3) ==
Clinical trials have also explored its prophylactic potential against viral infections. In a randomized, double-blind, placebo-controlled study involving elderly subjects, daily supplementation with MGN-3 was associated with a significant reduction in the incidence of influenza-like illnesses (9/40 in the placebo group versus 2/40 in the treatment group). This protective effect is linked to the upregulation of NK cell cytotoxic activity and the increased expression of the degranulation marker CD107a.
