= Glucuronoxylan =

Class of polysaccharides

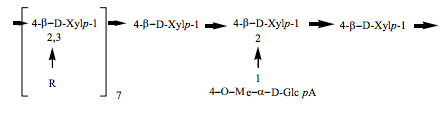
Principal structure of glucuronoxylan in hardwood

Glucuronoxylans are the primary components of hemicellulose as found in hardwood trees, such as birch. They are hemicellulosic plant cell-wall polysaccharides, containing glucuronic acid and xylose as its main constituents. They are linear polymers of β-D-xylopyranosyl units linked by (1→4) glycosidic bonds, with many of the xylose units substituted with 2-, 3-, or 2,3-linked glucuronate residue, which are often methylated at position 4. Most of the glucuronoxylans have single 4-O-methyl-α-D-glucopyranosyl uronate residues (MeGlcA) attached at position 2. This structural type is usually named as 4-O-methyl-D-glucurono-D-xylan (MGX).

Angiosperm (hardwood) glucuronoxylans also have a high rate of substitution (70–80%) by acetyl groups, at position 2 or 3 of the β-D-xylopyranosyl, conferring on the xylan its partial solubility in water.
