= Xylan =

Plant cell wall polysaccharide

Structure of xylan in hardwood.

Plant cell wall is composed of cellulose, hemicellulose, pectin and glycoproteins. Hemicelluloses (a heterogeneous group of polysaccharides) cross-link glycans interlocking the cellulose fibers and form a mesh like structure to deposit other polysaccharides.

Xylan (/ˈzaɪlæn/; /ˈzaɪlən/) (CAS number: 9014-63-5) is a type of hemicellulose, a polysaccharide consisting mainly of xylose residues. It is found in plants, in the secondary cell walls of dicots and all cell walls of grasses. Xylan is considered to be the second most abundant plant biopolymer, and the third most abundant polysaccharide on Earth after cellulose and chitin.

== Composition ==
Xylans are polysaccharides made up of β-1,4-linked xylose (a pentose sugar) residues with side branches of α-arabinofuranose and/or α-glucuronic acids. On the basis of substituted groups xylan can be categorized into three classes i) glucuronoxylan (GX) ii) neutral arabinoxylan (AX) and iii) glucuronoarabinoxylan (GAX). In some cases contribute to cross-linking of cellulose microfibrils and lignin through ferulic acid residues.

== Occurrence ==
=== Plant cell structure ===
Xylans play an important role in the integrity of the plant cell wall and increase cell wall recalcitrance to enzymatic digestion; thus, they help plants to defend against herbivores and pathogens (biotic stress). Xylan also plays a significant role in plant growth and development. Typically, xylans content in hardwoods is 10-35%, whereas they are 10-15% in softwoods. The main xylan component in hardwoods is O-acetyl-4-O-methylglucuronoxylan, whereas arabino-4-O-methylglucuronoxylans are a major component in softwoods. In general, softwood xylans differ from hardwood xylans by the lack of acetyl groups and the presence of arabinose units linked by α-(1,3)-glycosidic bonds to the xylan backbone.

=== Algae ===
Some macrophytic green algae contain xylan (specifically homoxylan) especially those within the Codium and Bryopsis genera where it replaces cellulose in the cell wall matrix. Similarly, it replaces the inner fibrillar cell-wall layer of cellulose in some red algae.

=== Food science ===
The quality of cereal flours and the hardness of dough are affected by their xylan content, thus, playing a significant role in bread industry. The main constituent of xylan can be converted into xylitol (a xylose derivative), which is used as a natural food sweetener, which helps to reduce dental cavities and acts as a sugar substitute for diabetic patients. Poultry feed has a high percentage of xylan.

Xylan is one of the foremost anti-nutritional factors in common use feedstuff raw materials. Xylooligosaccharides produced from xylan are considered as "functional food" or dietary fibers due their potential prebiotic properties.

== Crystallinity ==
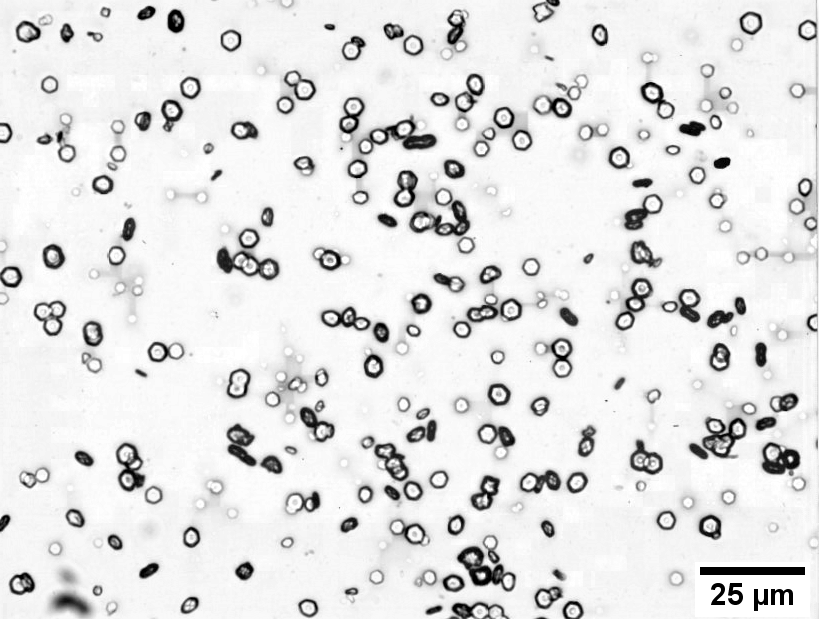
Optical microscope image of barley straw xylan single crystals mounted in Nephrax (reproduced from Yundt 1949).

The regular branching patterns of xylans may facilitate their co-crystallization with cellulose in the plant cell wall. Xylan also tends to crystallize from aqueous solution. Additional polymorphs of (1→4)-β-D-xylan have been obtained by crystallization from non-aqueous environments.

== Biosynthesis ==
Several glycosyltransferases are involved in the biosynthesis of xylans.

In eukaryotes, GTs represent about 1% to 2% of gene products. GTs are assembled into complexes existing in the Golgi apparatus. However, no xylan synthase complexes have been isolated from Arabidopsis tissues (dicot). The first gene involved in the biosynthesis of xylan was revealed on xylem mutants (irx) in Arabidopsis thaliana because of some mutation affecting xylan biosynthesis genes. As a result, abnormal plant growth due to thinning and weakening of secondary xylem cell walls was seen. Arabidopsis mutant irx9 (At2g37090), irx14 (At4g36890), irx10/gut2 (At1g27440), irx10-L/gut1 (At5g61840) showed defect in xylan backbone biosynthesis. Arabidopsis mutants irx7, irx8, and parvus are thought to be related to the reducing end oligosaccharide biosynthesis. Thus, many genes have been associated with xylan biosynthesis but their biochemical mechanism is still unknown. Zeng et al. (2010) immuno-purified xylan synthase activity from etiolated wheat (Triticum aestivum) microsomes. Jiang et al. (2016) reported a xylan synthase complex (XSC) from wheat that has a central core formed of two members of the GT43 and GT47 families (CAZy database). They purified xylan synthase activity from wheat seedlings through proteomics analysis and showed that two members of TaGT43 and TaGT47 are sufficient for the synthesis of a xylan-like polymer in vitro.

== Breakdown ==
Xylanase converts xylan into xylose. Given that plants contain up to 30% xylan, xylanase is important to the nutrient cycle. The degradation of xylan and other hemicelluloses is relevant to the production of biofuels. Being less crystalline and more highly branched, these hemicelluloses are particularly susceptible to hydrolysis.

== Research ==
As a major component of plants, xylan is potentially a significant source of renewable energy especially for second generation biofuels. However, xylose (backbone of xylan) is a pentose sugar that is hard to ferment during biofuel conversion because microorganisms like yeast cannot ferment pentose naturally.
