= Balmoral chicken =

Chicken dish

Balmoral Chicken
- Alternative names: Highland Chicken; Chicken Balmoral
- Type: Savoury
- Course: Main
- Place of origin: Scotland
- Main ingredients: Chicken, haggis, whisky sauce, bacon

Balmoral chicken is a popular Scottish dish featuring chicken breast stuffed with haggis, wrapped in bacon and served with a whisky or peppercorn sauce. Balmoral chicken is named after Balmoral Castle in Aberdeenshire. As a dish featuring haggis it is a popular choice for a Burns supper, a national holiday to celebrate the life of poet Robert Burns.

== Dish ==
Balmoral chicken is typically served with mashed tatties and peas or another vegetable of choice. It is traditionally covered with a whisky cream sauce, although peppercorn sauce is a popular alternative.
