= Address to a Haggis =

1786 poem by Robert Burns

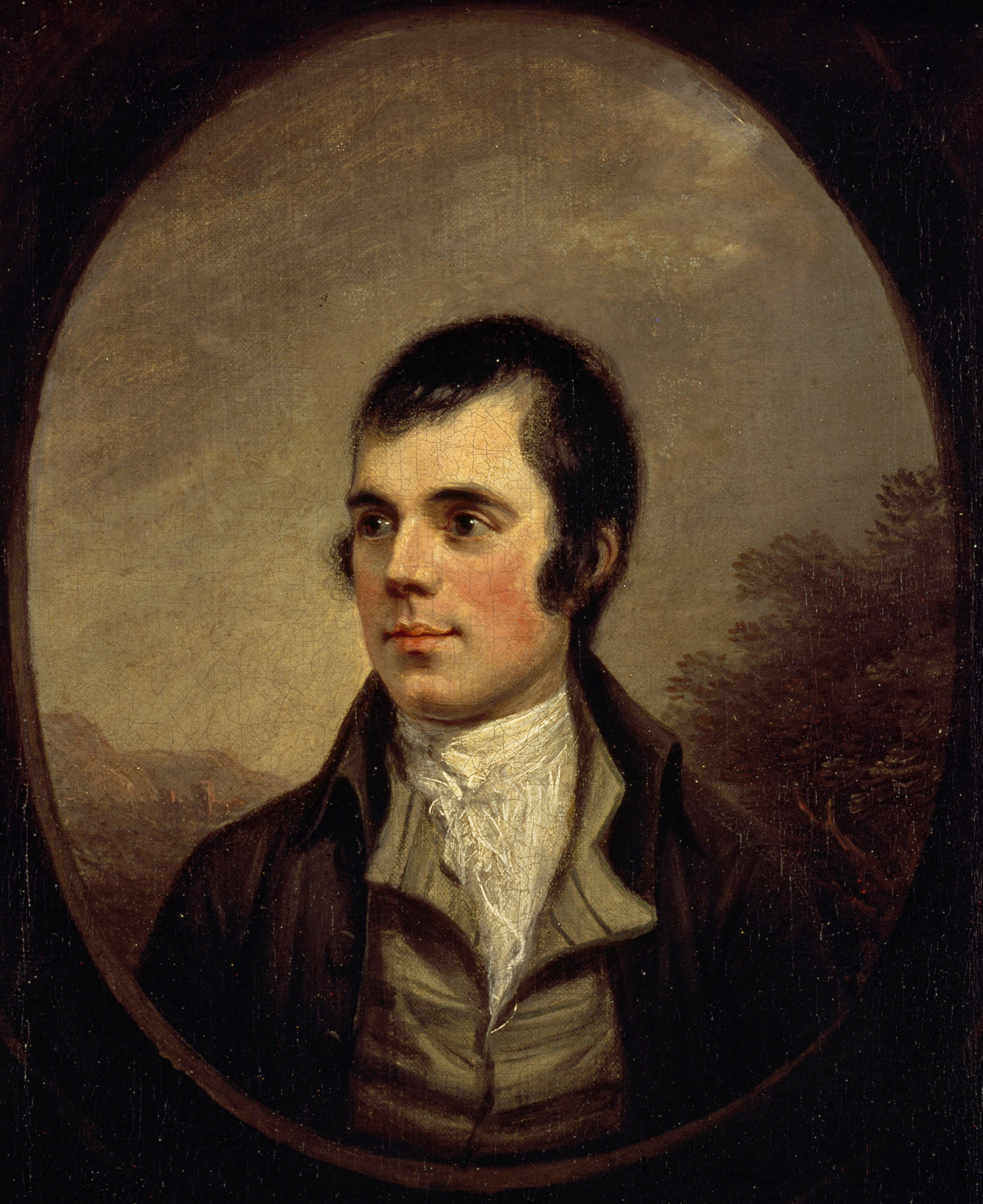
Portrait of Robert Burns

"Address to a Haggis" is a Scots-language poem written by Robert Burns in 1786. It was first published in the Caledonian Mercury on 19 December of that year, as "Address to a Haggice". The following year, it appeared in the Edinburgh Edition of Burns's Poems, Chiefly in the Scottish Dialect, with a different final verse.

Like many of Burns's poems, "Address to a Haggis" extols the virtues of something honest and humble—in this case, the peasant dish haggis, which Burns compares favourably with the French dishes that were fashionable in his time.

Both the dish and the poem have become essential features of Burns suppers, annual events celebrating the poet's life and works. Customarily, the assembly stands as a haggis is brought in on a silver salver, preceded by a bagpiper. The host or a guest then recites the poem, slicing open the haggis at the appropriate moment with a ceremonial knife.

== Poem ==
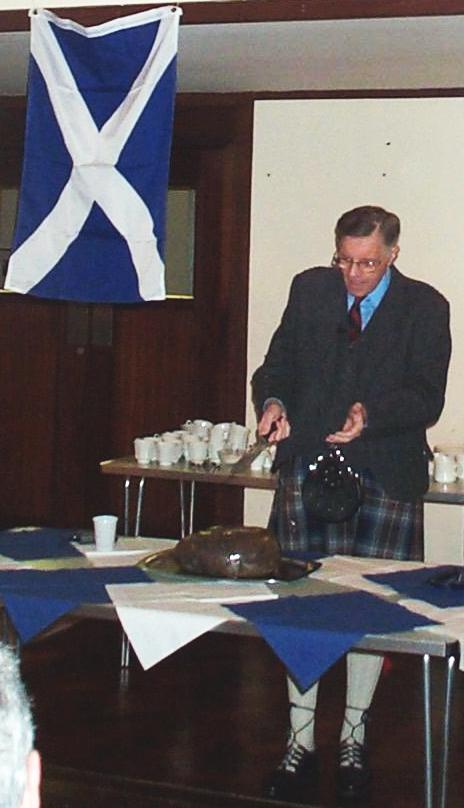
Recitation of the poem "Address to a Haggis" by Robert Burns is an important part of the Burns supper

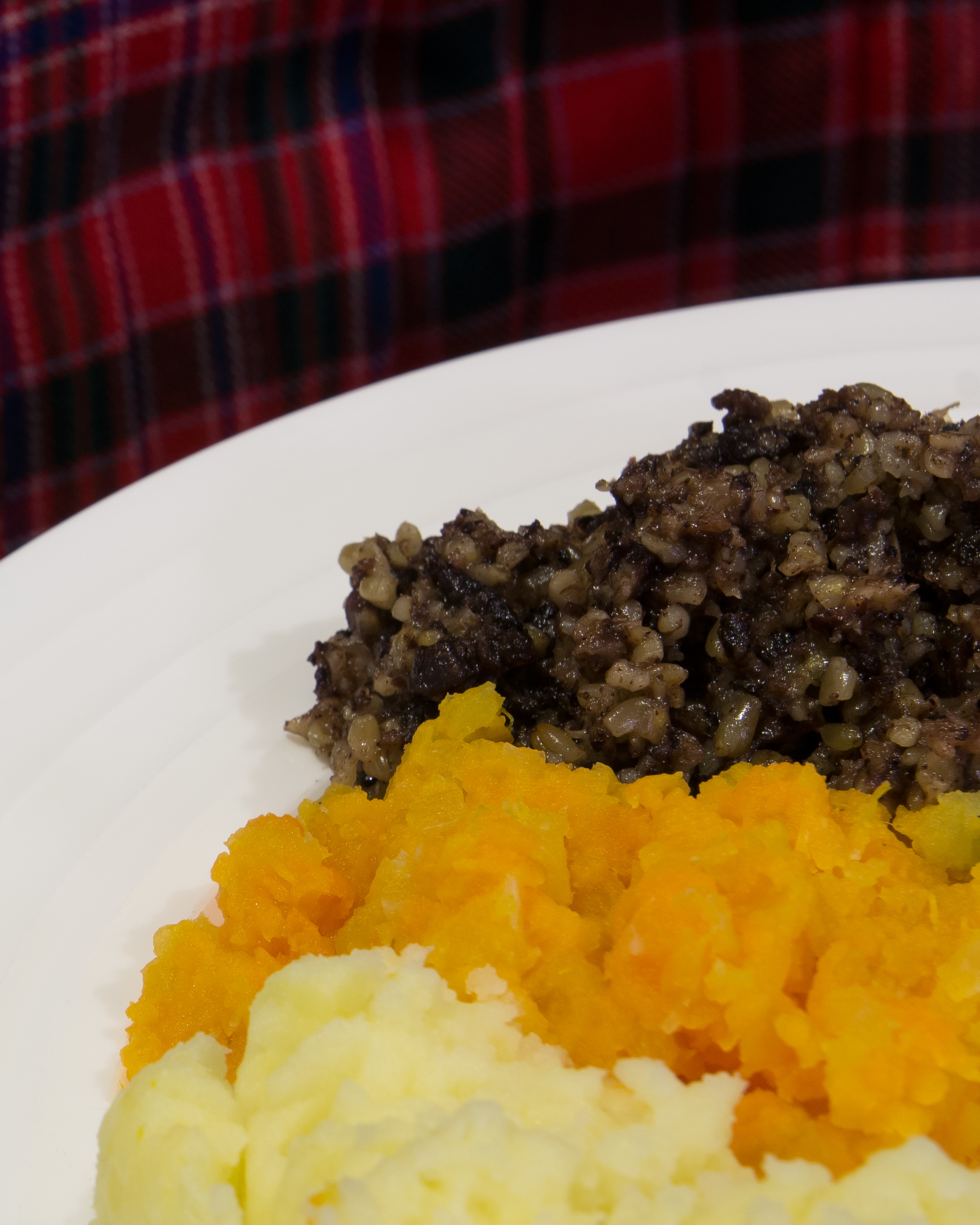
A serving of haggis, neeps, and tatties

Original text

Fair fa' your honest, sonsie face,
Great Chieftan o' the Puddin-race!
Aboon them a' ye tak your place,
Painch, tripe, or thairm:
Weel are ye wordy o' a grace
As lang's my arm.

The groaning trencher there ye fill,
Your hurdies like a distant hill,
Your pin wad help to mend a mill
In time o' need,
While thro' your pores the dews distil
Like amber bead.

His knife see rustic Labour dight,
An' cut you up wi' ready slight,
Trenching your gushing entrails bright
Like onie ditch;
And then, O what a glorious sight,
Warm-reekin, rich!

Then, horn for horn they stretch an' strive,
Deil tak the hindmost, on they drive,
Till a' their weel-swall'd kytes belyve
Are bent like drums;
Then auld Guidman, maist like to rive,
Bethankit hums.

Is there that owre his French ragout,
Or olio that wad staw a sow,
Or fricassee wad mak her spew
Wi' perfect sconner,
Looks down wi' sneering, scornfu' view
On sic a dinner?

Poor devil! see him owre his trash,
As feckless as a wither'd rash,
His spindle shank a guid whip-lash,
His nieve a nit;
Thro' bluidy flood or field to dash,
O how unfit!

But mark the Rustic, haggis-fed,
The trembling earth resounds his tread,
Clap in his walie nieve a blade,
He'll mak it whissle;
An' legs, an' arms, an' heads will sned,
Like taps o' thrissle.

Ye Pow'rs wha mak mankind your care,
And dish them out their bill o' fare,
Auld Scotland wants nae skinking ware
That jaups in luggies;
But, if ye wish her gratefu' pray'r,
Gie her a haggis!

Translation:
English translation

Good luck to you and your honest, plump face,
Great chieftain of the pudding race!
Above them all you take your place,
Stomach, tripe, or bowels:
Well are you worthy of a grace
As long as my arm.

The groaning trencher there you fill,
Your buttocks like a distant hill,
Your pin would help to mend a mill
In time of need;
While through your pores the dews distill
Like amber bead.

His knife see rustic Labour wipe
And cut you up with ready sleight,
Trenching your gushing entrails bright,
Like any ditch;
And then, O what a glorious sight,
Warm-steaming, rich!

Then, spoon for spoon, they stretch and strive,
Devil take the hindmost, on they drive,
Till all their well-swollen bellies by-and-by
Are bent like drums;
Then old Master, most like to burst,
Thanks be! hums.

Is there that over his French ragout,
Or olio that would sicken a sow,
Or fricassee would make her spew
With perfect disgust,
Looks down with sneering, scornful view
On such a dinner?

Poor devil! see him over his trash,
As feeble as a withered rush,
His thin leg a good whiplash,
His fist a nut;
Through bloody flood or field to dash,
O how unfit!

But mark the Rustic, haggis-fed,
The trembling earth resounds his tread,
Clap in his ample fist a blade,
He'll make it whistle;
And legs, and arms, and heads will sever,
Like heads of thistles.

You powers who make mankind your care,
And dish them out their bill of fare,
Old Scotland wants no watery stuff
That slops in bowls;
But if you wish her grateful prayer,
Give her a haggis!
