= Rød pølse =

Type of red sausage common in Denmark

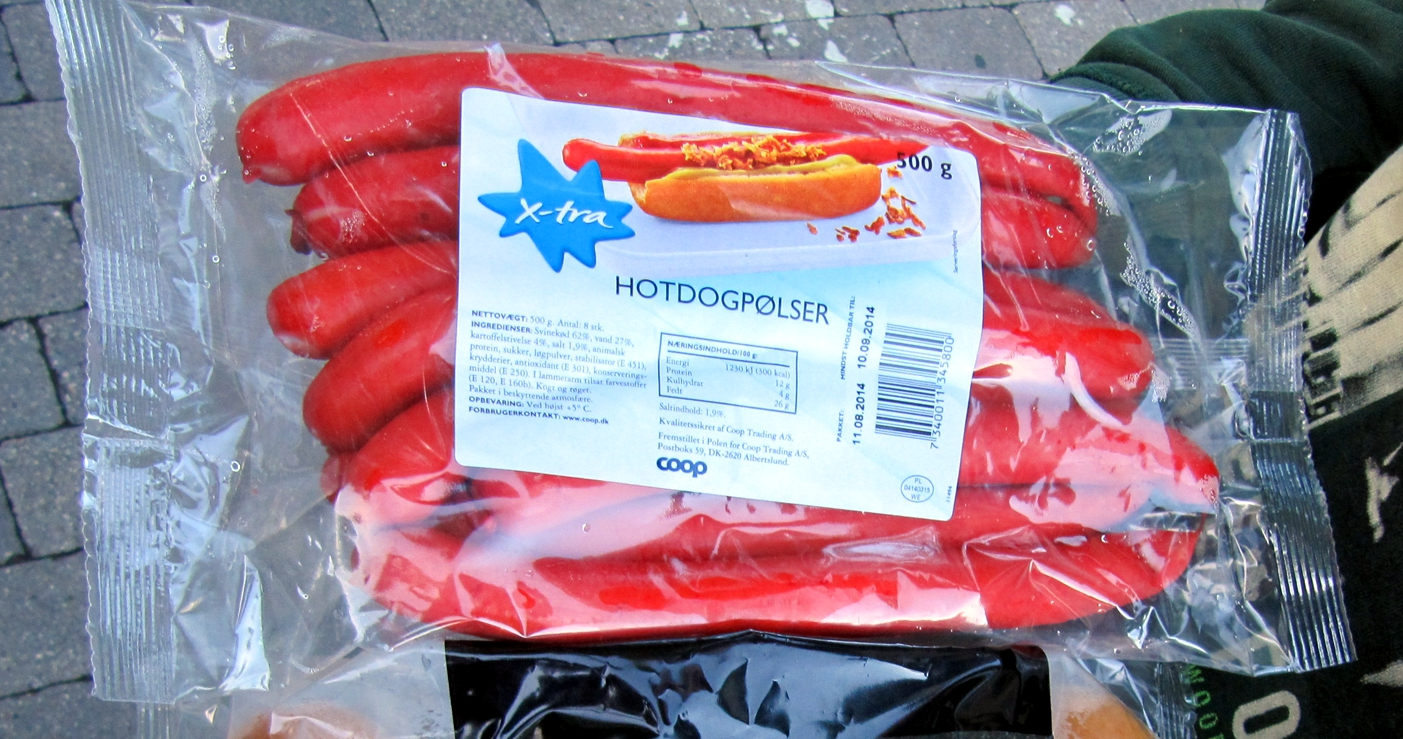
Red pølser from a supermarket

Rød pølse ("red sausage") is a type of brightly red, boiled pork sausage very common in Denmark. Since hot dog stands are almost everywhere in Denmark, some people regard røde pølser as one of the national dishes. They are made of the Vienna type and the skin is colored with a traditional red dye (carmine).

== Traditional preparation ==
Rød pølse are to be heated in hot water and are commonly served with remoulade, mustard, ketchup, fried onions, raw onions and pickled sliced cucumber (gherkin). A common legend says that it was once ordered that day-old sausages be dyed as a means of warning. Another interpretation is that starting in the 1920s, vendors used red dye to disguise the diminished quality of older sausages.

== Other Scandinavian sausages ==
Scandinavian sausages are usually made of 60–80% finely ground pork, spiced with pepper, nutmeg, allspice or similar sweet spices (ground mustard seed, onions and sugar may also be added). Water, lard, pork rind, potato starch flour and soybean or milk protein are often added as fillers. Nearly all commercially available sausages are industrially precooked to be subsequently fried or heated in boiling water.

In Norway, sausages are most often served in white buns or with the traditional potato flat-bread "lompe" which is similar to lefse. The sausages are grilled or heated in lightly seasoned hot water, and they are normally served with ketchup and mustard. Many different condiments can be added, such as dry, fried onion, shrimp-salad, potato-salad or mashed potatoes.

In Iceland, the sausages may contain mutton, giving them a distinct taste.

== See also ==
- Pølsevogn, Danish hot dog stands
- Pölsa is a similar-sounding word in Swedish, but the Swedish word for sausage is "korv".
- Hot dog is a similar sausage found in other parts of the world.
- List of sausages
