= Pölsa =

Traditional northern Swedish dish

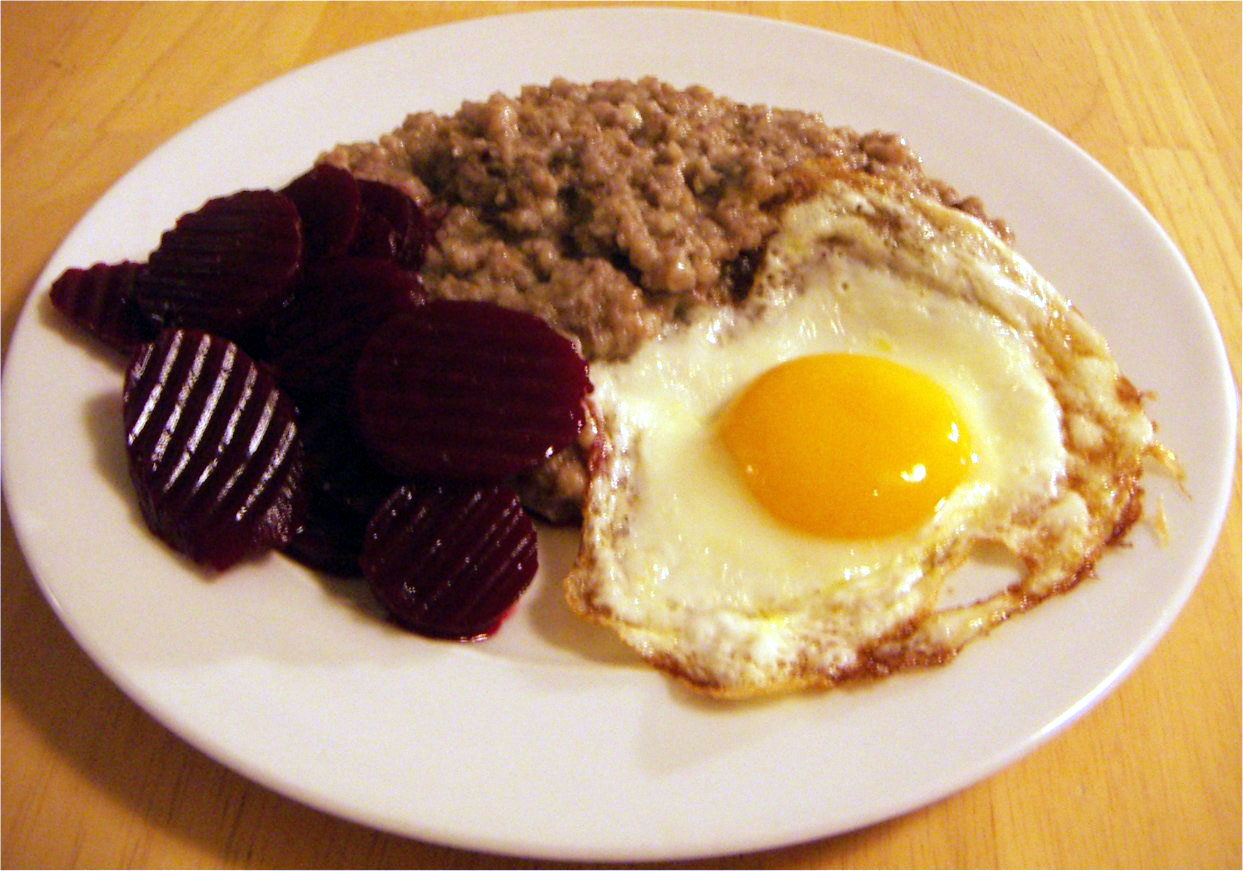
Pölsa served with a fried egg and pickled beetroot

Pölsa is a traditional northern Swedish dish that is a close relative to Scottish haggis. The main ingredients are beef sinew, liver, heart, lung, onion, and barley, mixed with stock, black pepper, and marjoram. Sometimes ground beef or minced pork is added. It is usually served with mashed or boiled potatoes and pickled beetroot, and sometimes a fried egg.

== Background ==
The Norwegian and Danish word pølse means sausage and even if the two dishes don't look the same, the two words are related. Pölsa is simply a traditional variety of sausage filling without any casing.

== In popular culture ==
The dish plays a central role in the allegorical novel Pölsan (2002) by Swedish author Torgny Lindgren (1938–2017), in which two men go on a personal quest across postwar Sweden in search of the genuine Swedish "pölsa".

== See also ==
- Haggis – similar food from Scotland
- Labskaus – similar food from Northern Germany
- Lobscouse – similar food from Norway
- Scouse (food) – similar food from the Liverpool area
- Stippgrütze – related food from Westphalia
- Hakkemat – similar food from Norway
- Faggots – similar food from western Britain
