= Pølsevogn =

Danish hot dog stands

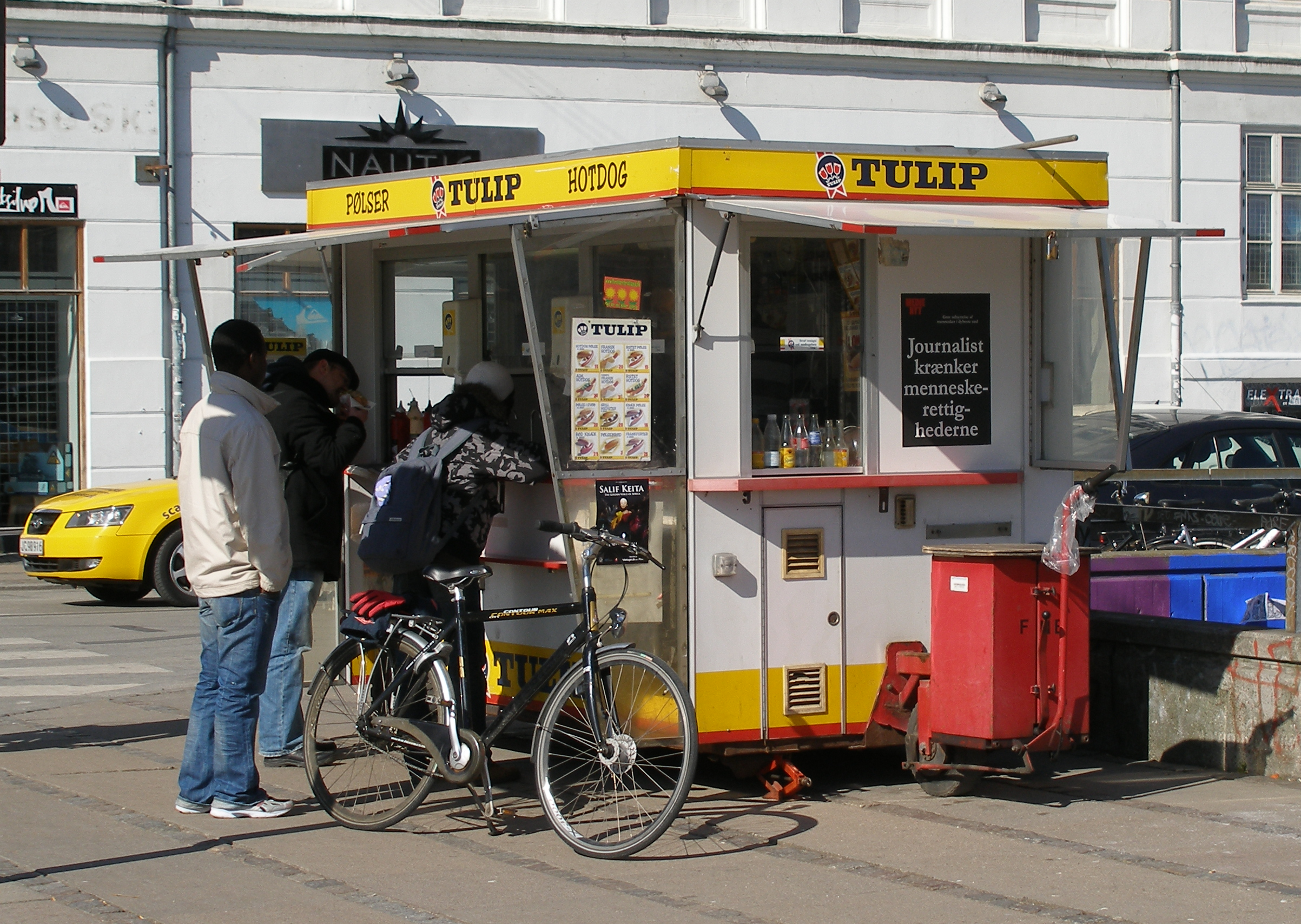
Pølsevogn at Nørrebro in Copenhagen.

Pølsevogn(e) (lit. 'sausage wagon(s)') are hot dog stands that sell Danish-style hot dogs, such as rød pølse, and sausages as street food. Today, some are mobile, and some are, despite their names, permanent structures. They are equipped with a small kitchen, boilers, an external desk and room for a pølsemand (sausage-man) preparing and selling hot dogs to passing customers. Pølsevogne are numerous across Denmark and are popular among Danes and tourists alike.

== History ==
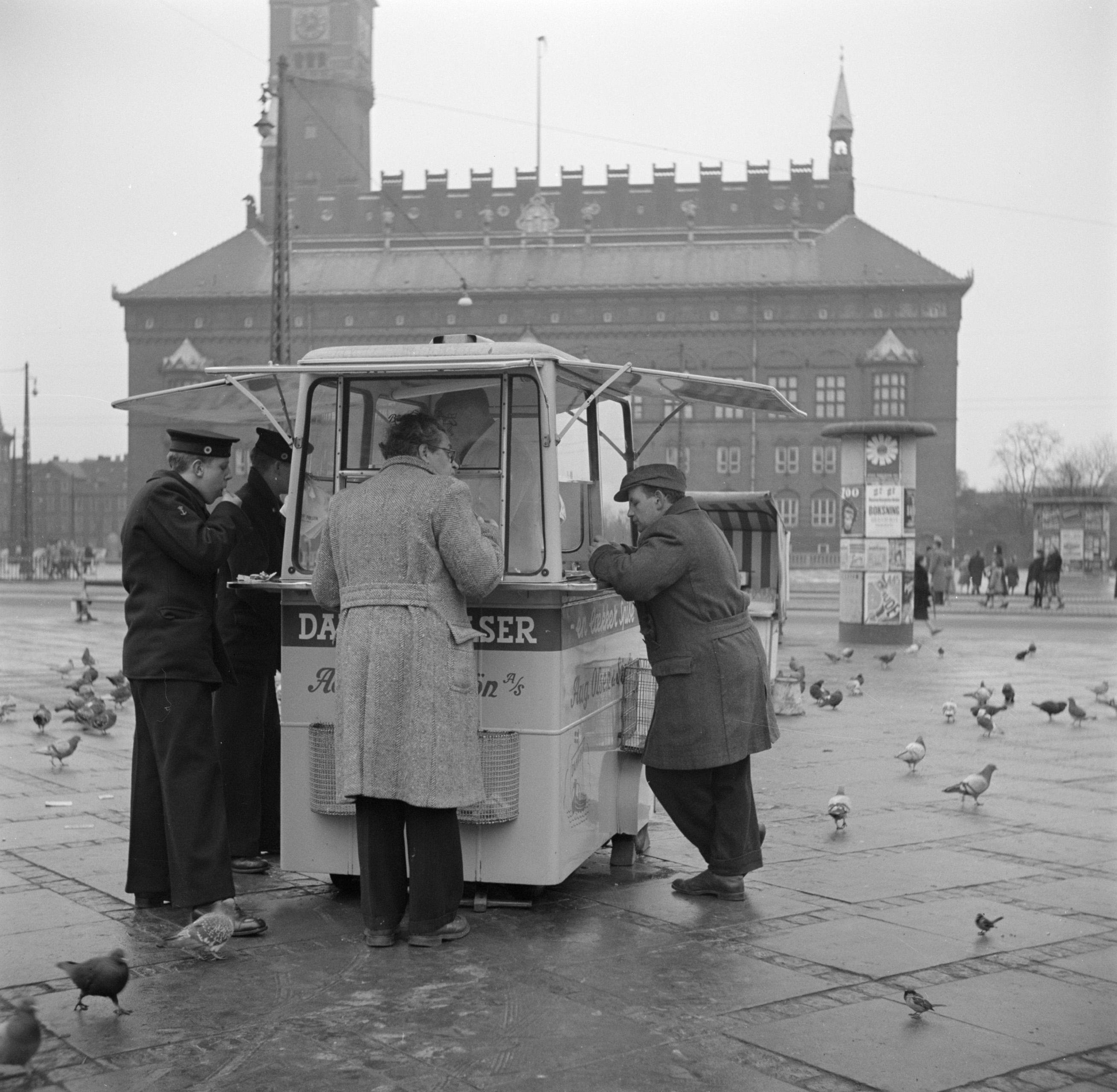
People eating at a pølsevogn in Copenhagen, Denmark in 1954

The first pølsevogne in Denmark entered the streets of Aarhus in 1917.

On 18 January 1921, the first 6 pølsevogne entered the streets of Copenhagen. In the 1960s and 1970s there were more than 700 pølsevogne in Denmark. In 2021, there were 100.

== Fare ==
Apart from Danish-style hot dogs, sausage-wagons also sell a variety of sausages (pork almost exclusively), and many also offers other types of Danish barbecue fast food like bøfsandwich, fransk hotdog and pølse i svøb and beverages like chocolate milk, soft drinks, coffee or beer. The mustard served in Denmark is strong, unsweetened and less sour than what is encountered elsewhere, and hot dogs and sausages also come with ketchup, Danish remoulade and a sweet soft bun. Danish-style hot dogs have some regional variety. In most places they are served with pickled cucumbers, while other places serve them with pickled red cabbage.

The immigration and gradual integration of immigrants have also influenced this Danish tradition and resulted in a Halal pølsevogn being opened in Nørrebro, Copenhagen.

== Outside Denmark ==
Danish-themed hot dog stands can be found in more and more countries throughout the world. 130 pølsevogne exist in Russia alone. Other countries with pølsevogne include Norway, Sweden, Finland, Germany, the United Kingdom, Spain and as far away as Singapore. Many of these exist due to large Danish permanent or tourist communities. Pølsevogne have also been known to travel with Danish groups to events like the Le Mans 24-hour race.

Some pølsevogne have made trips to and around other countries. This includes a cross-country trip through the United States, collecting money for charity, and a 2213 km Copenhagen-Paris trip, as part of a bet with a main supplier of hot dog buns.

== Gallery ==
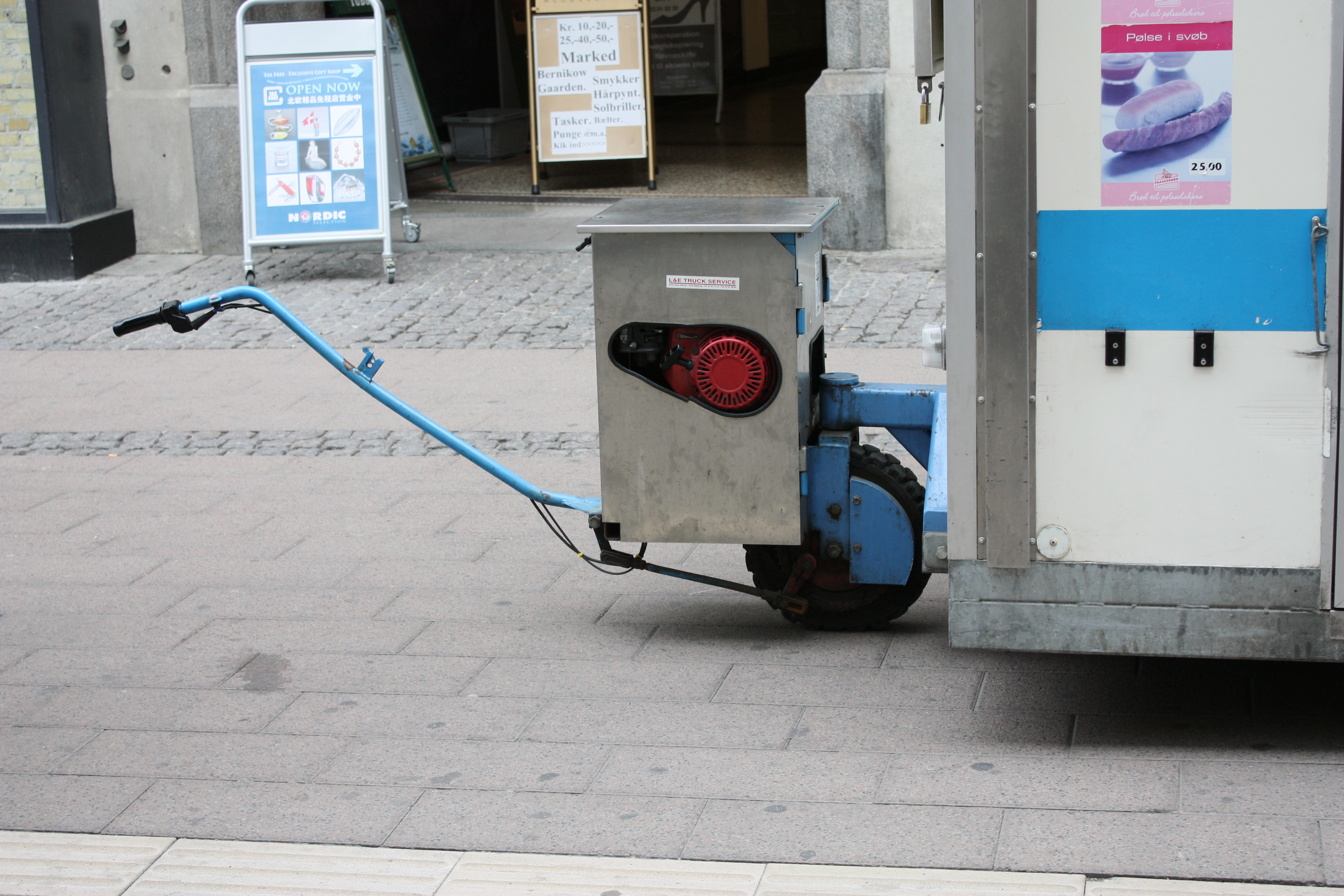
Motor and tow bar on a mobile pølsevogn.

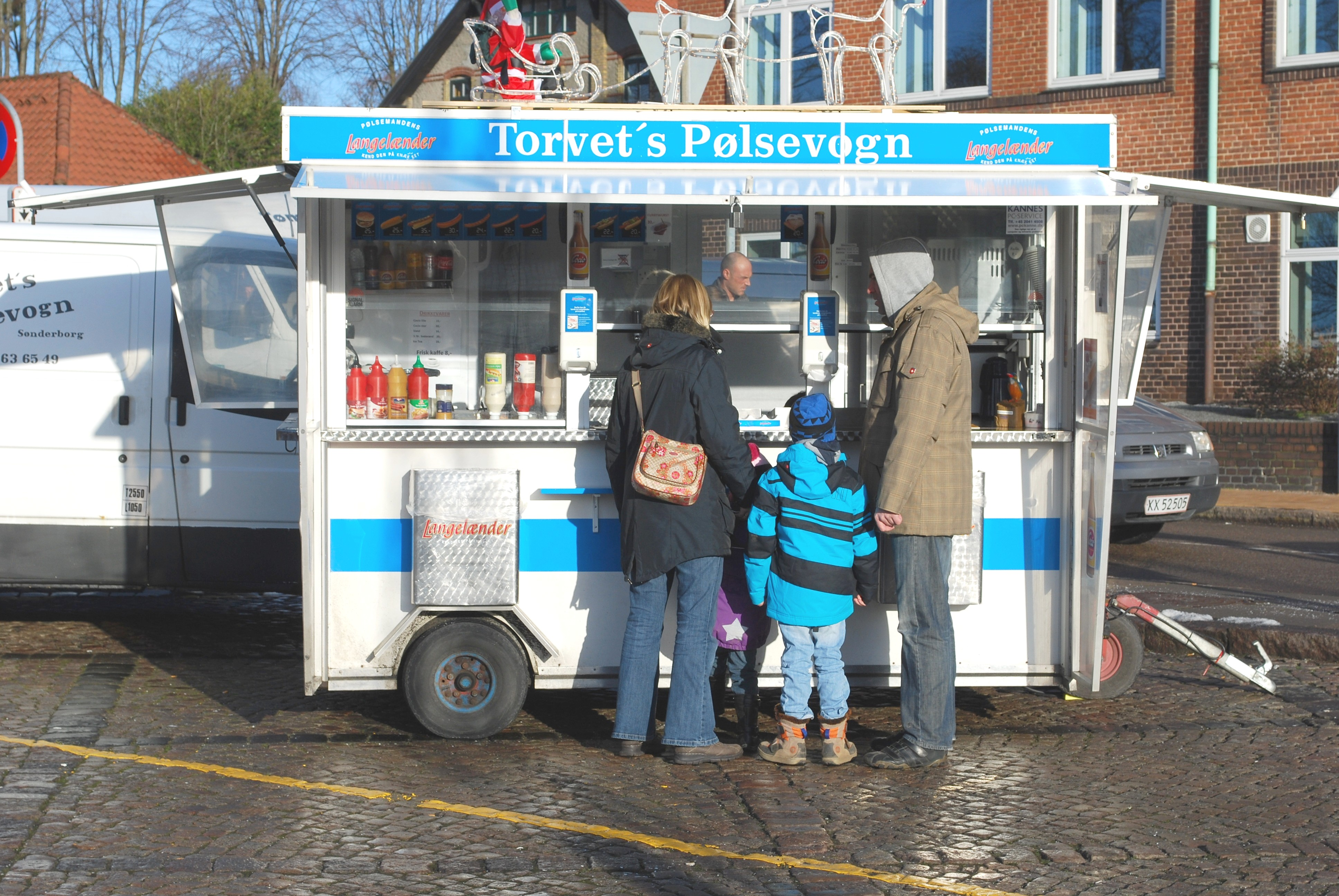
A pølsevogn in Sønderborg.

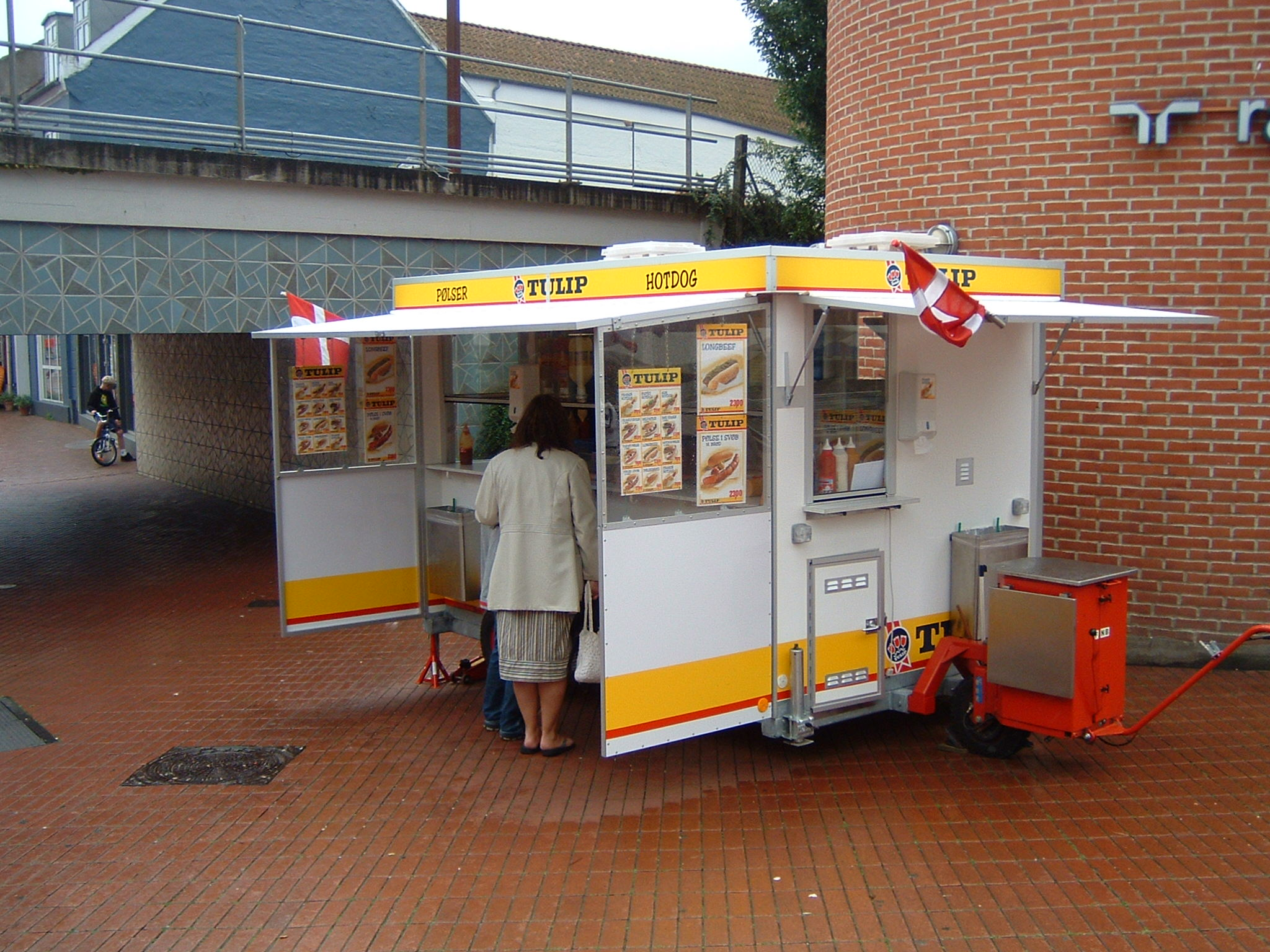
A pølsevogn in the city center of Kolding.

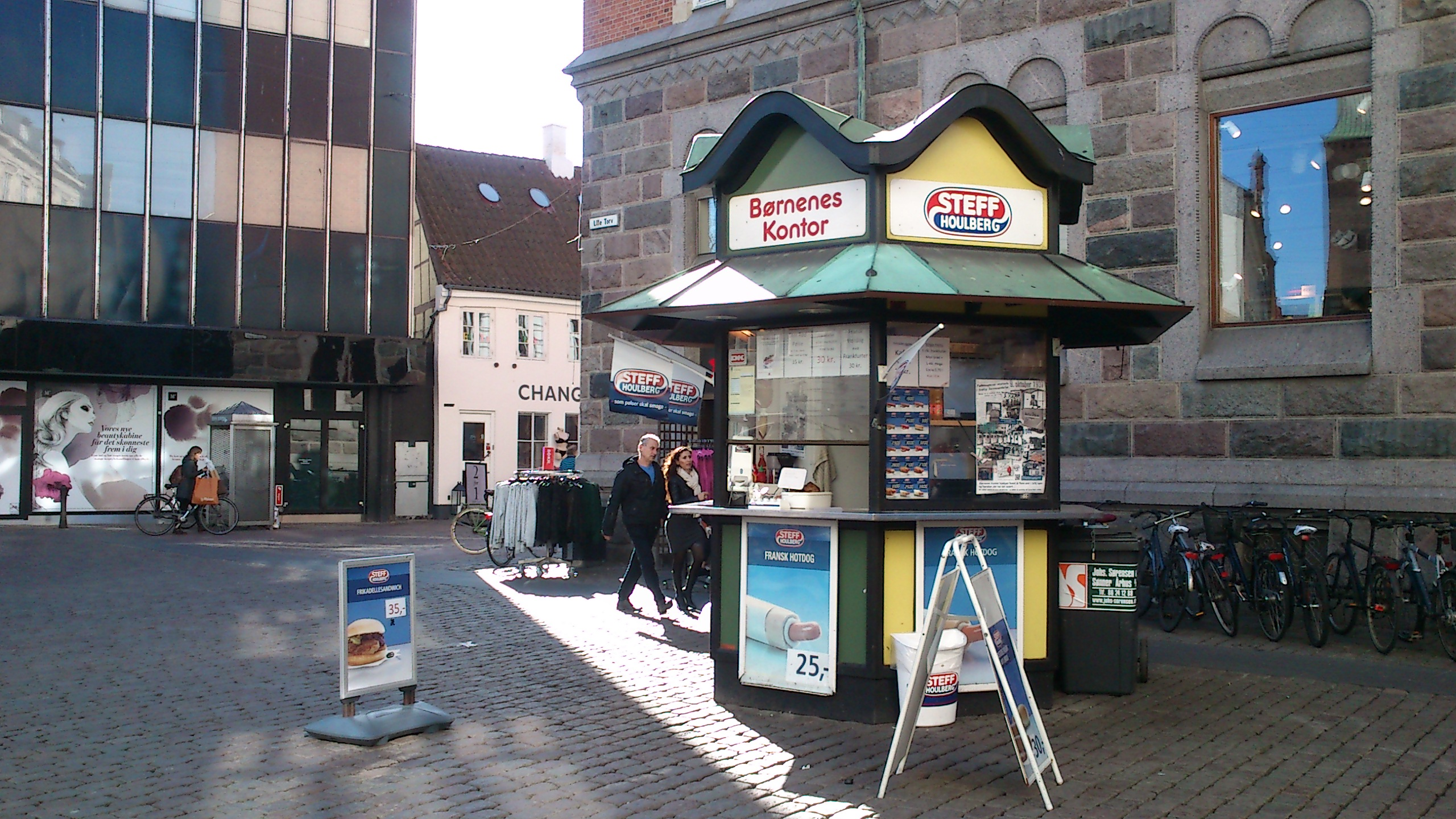
A stationary pølsevogn in Aarhus
