= Ragout =

French main-dish stew

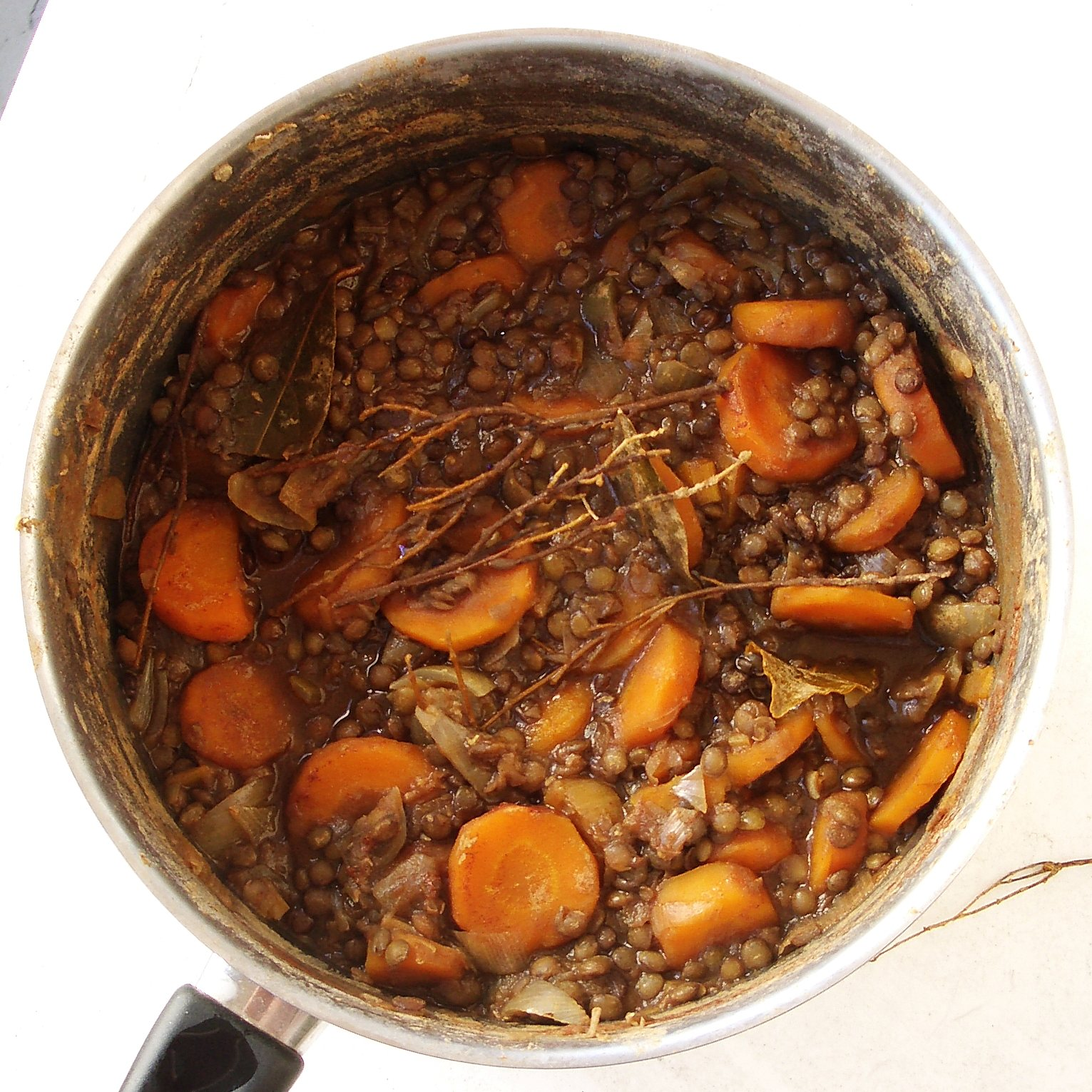
- Ragoût aux lentilles
- Type: Stew
- Place of origin: France
- Region or state: Paris

Ragout (/ræˈɡuː/, French: ragoût, French: [ʁaɡu]) is a stew served as a main dish.

== Etymology ==
The term comes from the French ragoûter, meaning 'to revive the taste'.

== Preparation ==
The basic method of preparation involves slow cooking over a low heat. The main ingredients are many; ragouts may be prepared with or without meat, a wide variety of vegetables may be incorporated, and they may be more or less heavily spiced and seasoned.

== Examples ==
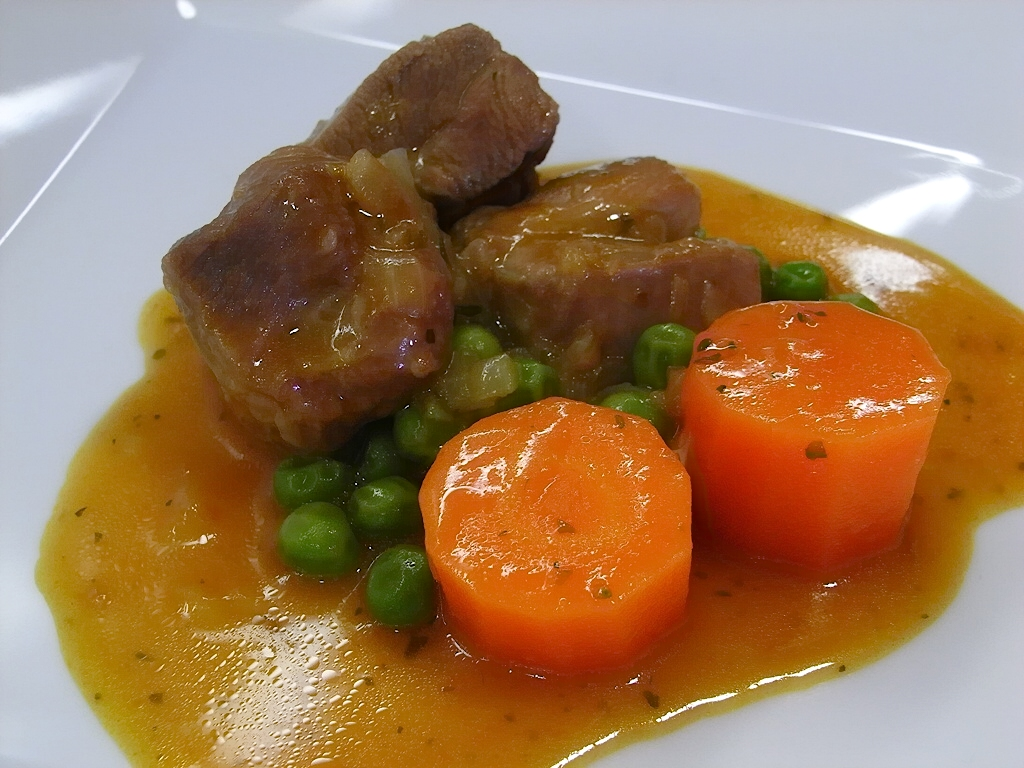
Plated turkey ragout

The Roman-era cookbook Apicius includes a recipe for ragout with ostrich meat. According to a translation by Patrick Faas, it incorporated dates, honey, vinegar, garum (a fish sauce), passum (a dessert wine), and spices such as pepper, mint, roast cumin, and celery seed. The Apicius recipe suggests boiling all the ingredients save for the ostrich meat together in a pot, binding them with starch, and pouring the mixture over boiled ostrich meat, while Faas, in his reconstruction, tells the reader to first make a roux with flour and olive oil and add passum, spices, honey, vinegar, dates, and garum in a certain order, after which the reader can then stir in the ostrich meat, which he says can be roasted or fried.

Two 18th-century English dishes from The Complete Housewife show some of the varying meats, vegetables, seasonings, garnishes and procedures which can be applied to the ragoût.

A Ragu for made Dishes
TAKE claret, gravy, sweet-herbs, and savoury spice, toss up in it lamb-stones (i.e. lamb's testicles), cock's-combs, boiled, blanched, and sliced, with sliced sweet-meats, oysters, mushrooms, truffles, and morels; thicken these with brown butter; use it when called for.

To make a Ragu of Pigs-Ears
TAKE a quantity of pigs-ears, and boil them in one half wine and the other water; cut them in small pieces, then brown a little butter, and put them in, and a pretty deal of gravy, two anchovies, an eschalot or two, a little mustard, and some slices of lemon, some salt and nutmeg: stew all these together, and shake it up thick. Garnish the dish with barberries.

In his 19th-century culinary dictionary, Alexandre Dumas credits ragouts with making "the ancient French cuisine shine". He gives several examples including salpicons, made with a variety of meats and vegetables like mushrooms, artichokes, truffles, quenelles, and sweetbreads. According to Dumas each ingredient is cooked separately. The "Ordinary Salpicon" includes veal sweetbreads, ham, mushrooms, foie gras and truffles served in espagnole sauce. Celery ragout is cooked in bouillon seasoned with salt, nutmeg and pepper. Cucumber ragout is made with velouté sauce. One ragout is made with madeira, chestnuts and chipolata sausages cooked in bouillon with espagnole sauce.

== In popular culture ==
The 1731 patriotic ballad "The Roast Beef of Old England" by the British writer Henry Fielding comically attributes Britain's traditional military prowess to the eating of roast beef, suggesting that this has been lost since the introduction of ragout from "all-vapouring France".

In Robert Burns' "Address to a Haggis" (1786), the poet suggests nobody could possibly choose French ragout when presented with the titular delicacy.

In the novel Pride and Prejudice, the character Mr. Hurst reacts with disdain when Elizabeth Bennet opts for a "plain dish" instead of a ragout at dinner.

In the Haddawy translation of The Arabian Nights, the Steward's tale about "The Young Man from Baghdad and Lady Zubaida's Maid" (beginning during the 121st night and continuing through the 130th night) tells of the suffering of a young man who attempts to consummate his marriage without having washed his hands after having eaten a large quantity of ragout spiced with cumin.

== See also ==
- List of stews
- Ragù
