= Haggis =

Scottish savoury pudding containing sheep's pluck

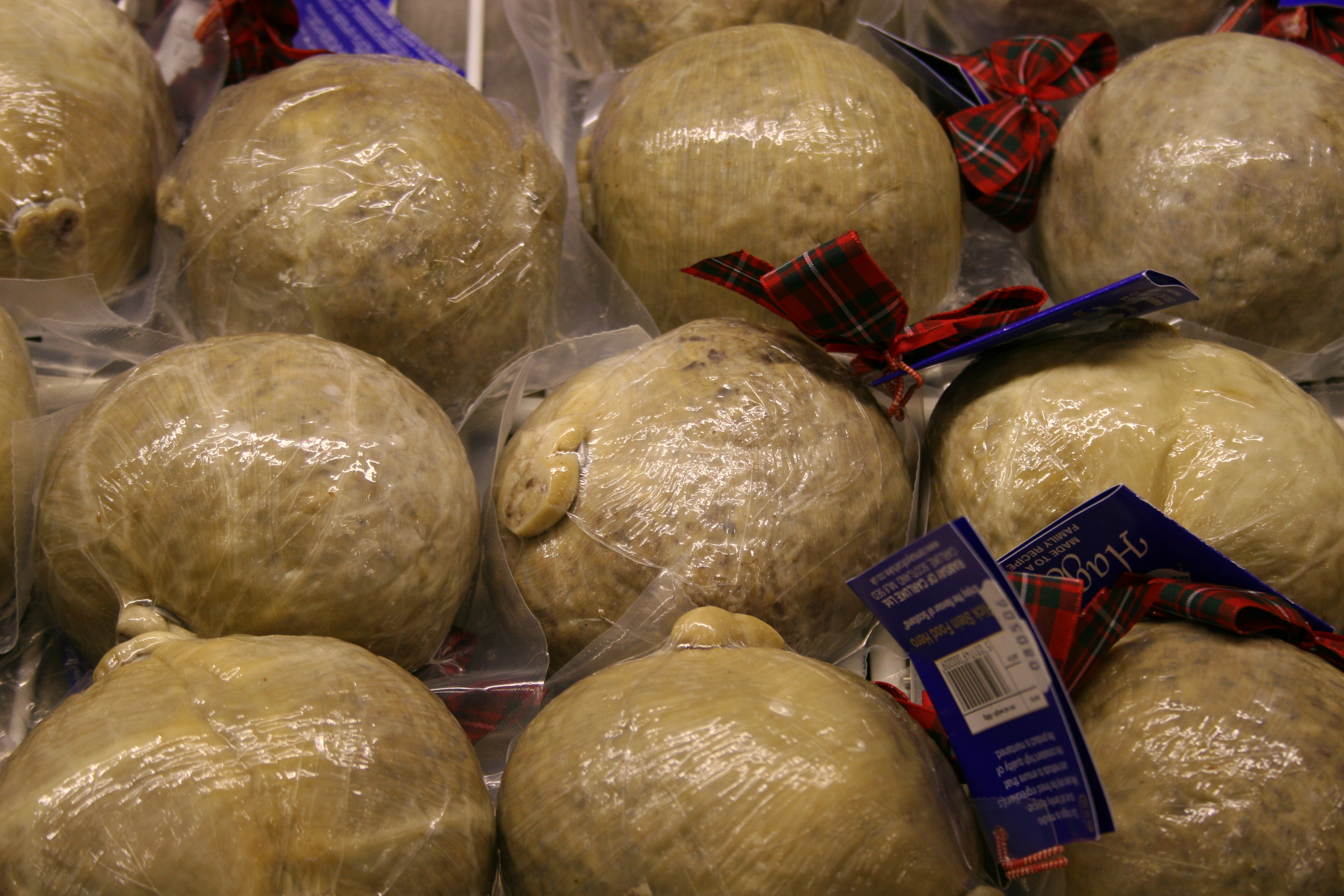
- Haggis displayed for sale
- Type: Pudding, sausage
- Place of origin: Scotland, with similar dishes found elsewhere in Europe.
- Associated cuisine: Scottish
- Main ingredients: Sheep's heart, liver and lungs, and stomach (or sausage casing); onion, oatmeal, suet, spices

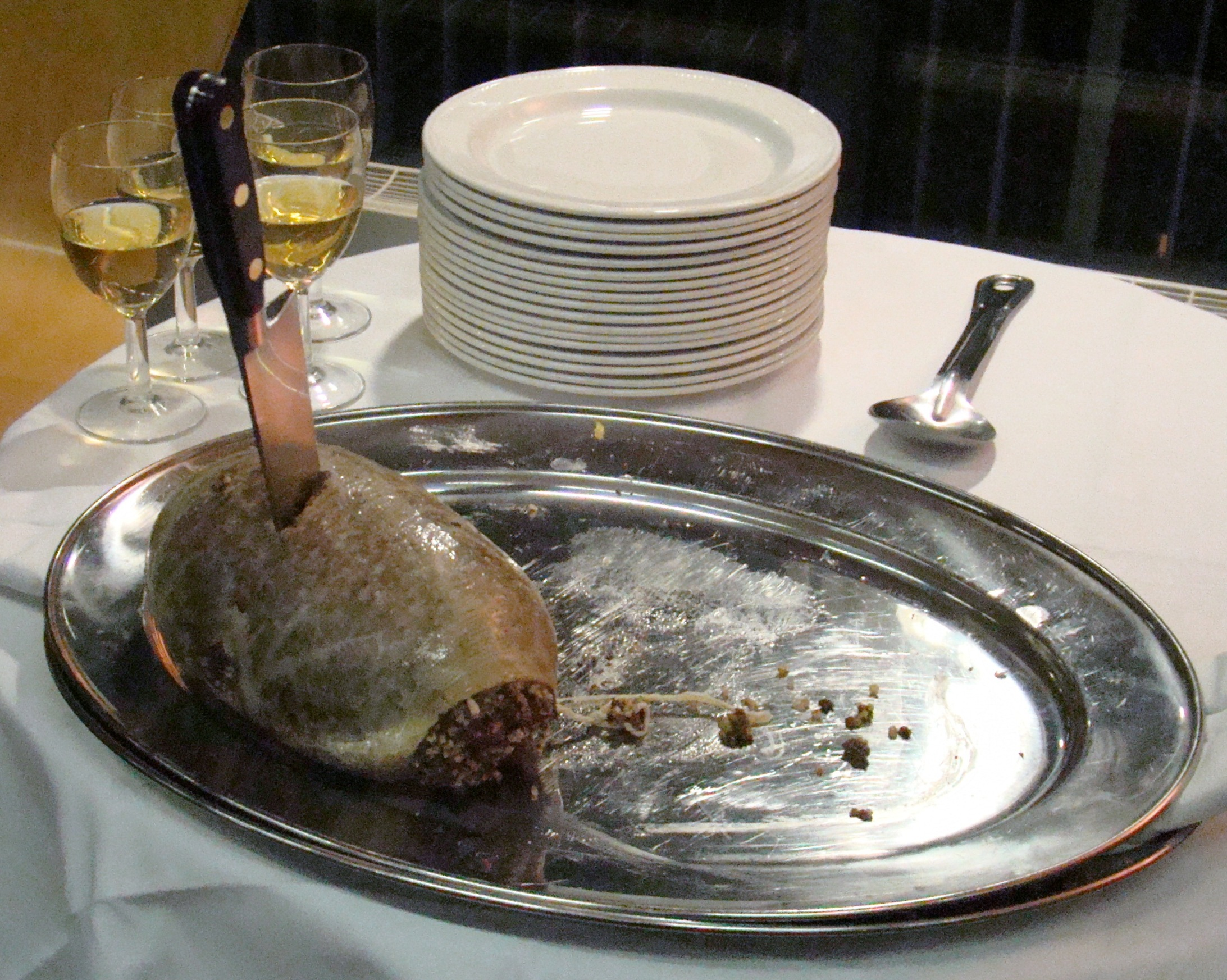
Haggis on a platter at a Burns supper

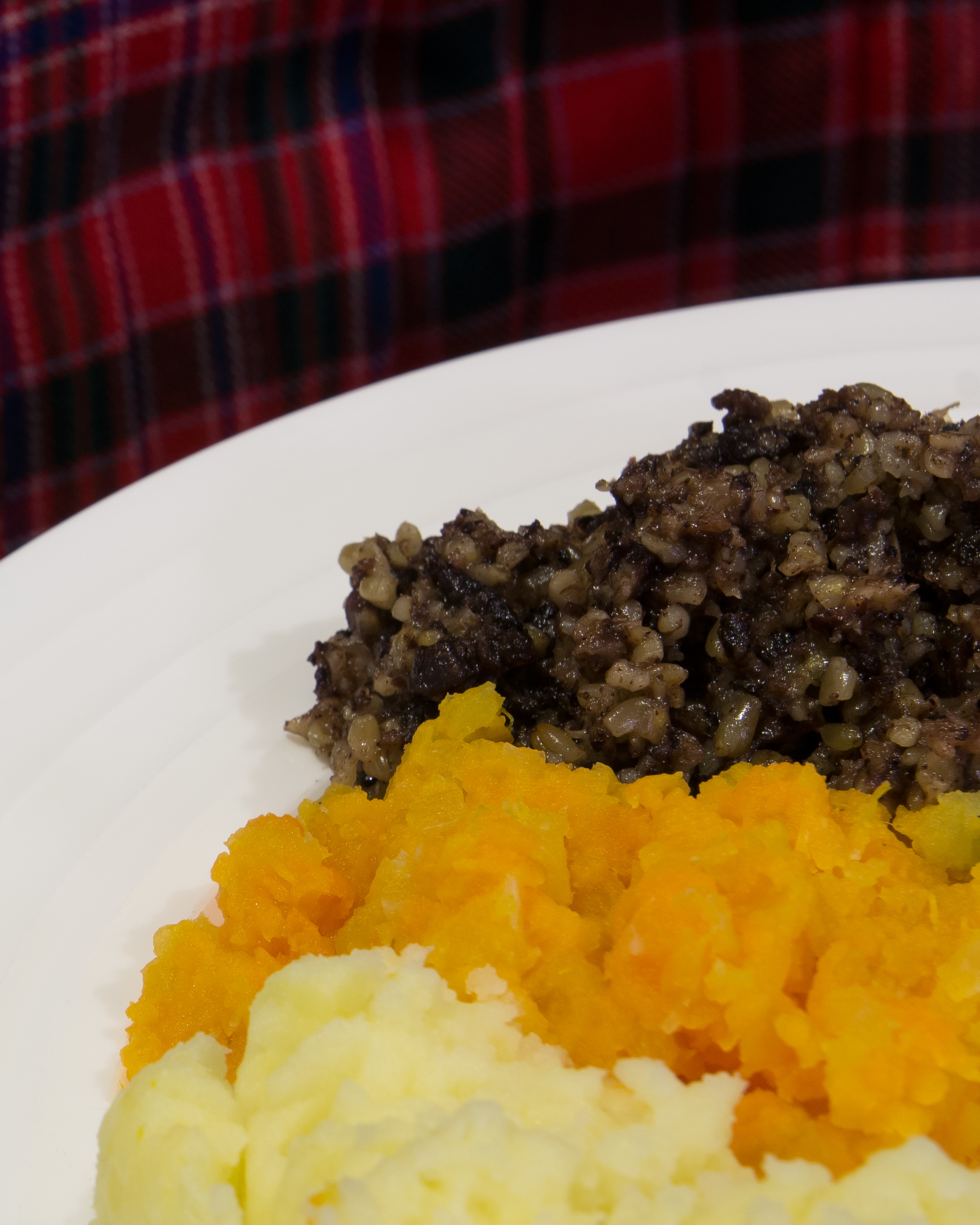
A serving of haggis, neeps, and tatties

Haggis (Scottish Gaelic: taigeis [ˈtʰakʲɪʃ]) is a savoury pudding and sausage containing sheep's pluck (heart, liver, and lungs), minced with chopped onion, oatmeal, suet, seasonings, and salt, mixed with stock, and cooked while traditionally encased in the animal's stomach though now an artificial casing is often used instead. According to the 2001 English edition of the Larousse Gastronomique: "Although its description is not immediately appealing, haggis has an excellent nutty texture and delicious savoury flavour".

It is believed that food similar to haggis — perishable offal quickly cooked inside an animal's stomach, all conveniently available after a hunt — was eaten from ancient times.

Although the name "hagws" or "hagese" was first recorded in England c. 1430, the dish is considered traditionally of Scottish origin. It is even the national dish as a result of Scots poet Robert Burns' poem "Address to a Haggis" of 1786. Haggis is traditionally served with "neeps and tatties", boiled and mashed separately, and a dram (a glass of Scotch whisky), especially as the main course of a Burns supper.

== History and etymology ==
=== Scottish theory ===
Haggis is popularly assumed to be of Scottish origin, but many countries have produced similar dishes with different names. However, the recipes as known and standardised now are distinctly Scottish. The first known written recipes for a dish of the name, made with offal and herbs, are as "hagese", in the verse cookbook Liber Cure Cocorum dating from around 1430 in Lancashire, north west England, and, as "hagws of a schepe" from an English cookbook also of c. 1430.

For hagese.
Þe hert of schepe, þe nere þou take,
Þo bowel noght þou shalle forsake,
On þe turbilen made, and boyled wele,
Hacke alle togeder with gode persole,

The earlier (1390) book The Forme of Cury by Richard II of England's master cooks includes a dish of grated meat in a pig's caul, without using such a name.

The Scottish poem "Flyting of Dunbar and Kennedy", which is dated before 1520 (the generally accepted date prior to the death of William Dunbar, one of the composers), refers to "haggeis".

Thy fowll front had, and he that Bartilmo flaid;
The gallowis gaipis eftir thy graceles gruntill,
As thow wald for ane haggeis, hungry gled.
— William Dunbar, Flyting of Dunbar and Kennedy

An early printed recipe for haggis appears in 1615 in The English Huswife by Gervase Markham. It contains a section entitled "Skill in Oate meale": "The use and vertues of these two severall kinds of Oate-meales in maintaining the Family, they are so many (according to the many customes of many Nations) that it is almost impossible to recken all"; and then proceeds to give a description of "oat-meale mixed with blood, and the Liver of either Sheepe, Calfe or Swine, maketh that pudding which is called the Haggas or Haggus, of whose goodnesse it is in vaine to boast, because there is hardly to be found a man that doth not affect them." (Gervase Markham, The English Huswife)

In her book The Haggis: A Little History, Dickson Wright suggests that haggis was invented as a way of cooking quick-spoiling offal near the site of a hunt, without the need to carry along an additional cooking vessel. The liver and kidneys could be grilled directly over a fire, but this treatment was unsuitable for the stomach, intestines, or lungs. Chopping up the lungs and stuffing the stomach with them and whatever fillers might have been on hand, then boiling the assembly – probably in a vessel made from the animal's hide – was one way to make sure these parts were not wasted.

=== Roman theory ===
Food writer Alan Davidson suggests that the ancient Romans were the first known to have made products of the haggis type. Haggis was "born of necessity, as a way to utilize the least expensive cuts of meat and the innards as well".

=== Norse theory ===
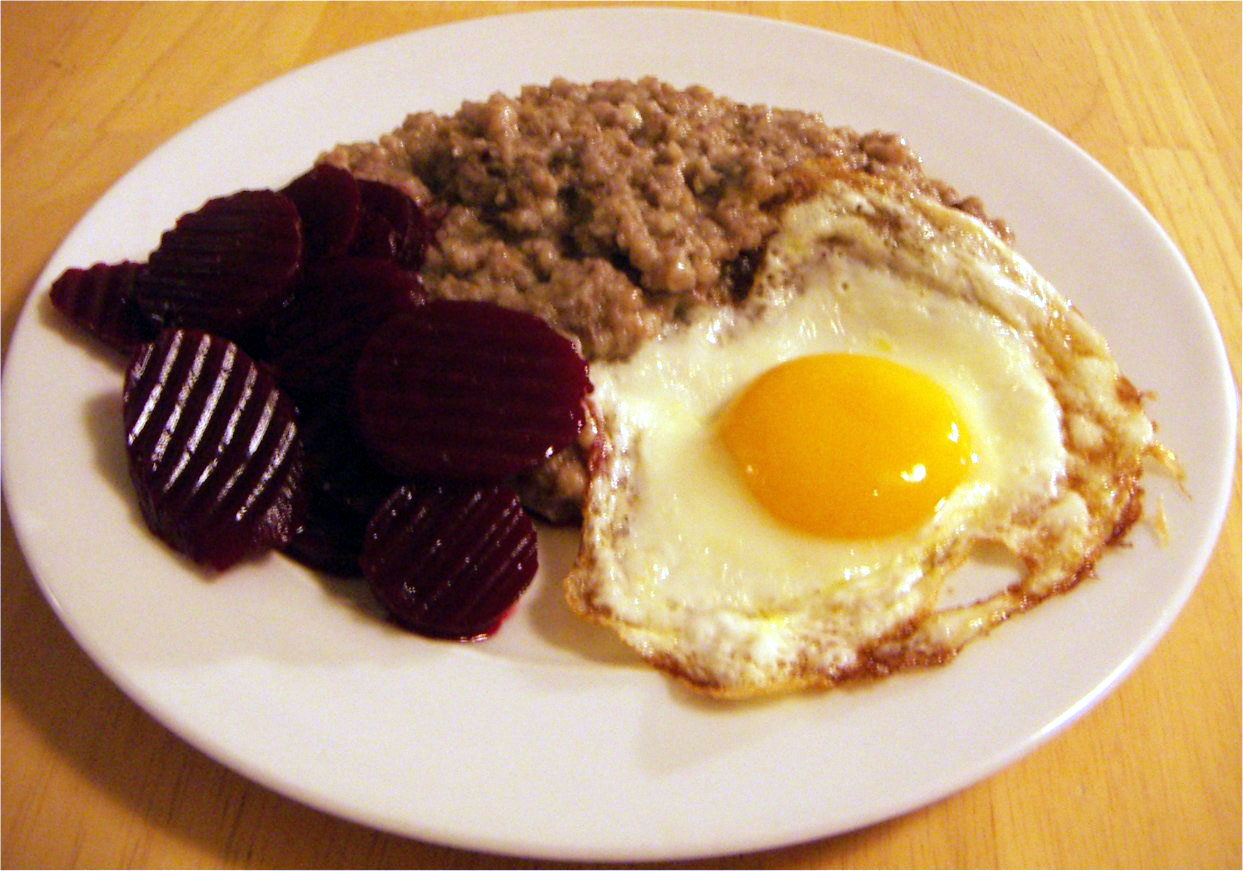
Swedish pölsa, a relative of haggis

Clarissa Dickson Wright says that it "came to Scotland in a longship [i.e., from Scandinavia] even before Scotland was a single nation". She cites etymologist Walter William Skeat as further suggestion of possible Scandinavian origins: Skeat claimed that the hag– element of the word is derived from Old Norse: haggw or the Old Icelandic hoggva, meaning 'to hew → chop → hack', same as in Modern Scots: hag, 'to hew' or strike with a sharp weapon, relating to the chopped-up contents of the dish.

The related Nordic variations of the root dish are traditionally called ”hew/chop-food”: Danish: hakkemad, Norwegian: hakkemat, Swedish: hackmat, in modern Swedish renamed to pölsa.

== Folklore ==
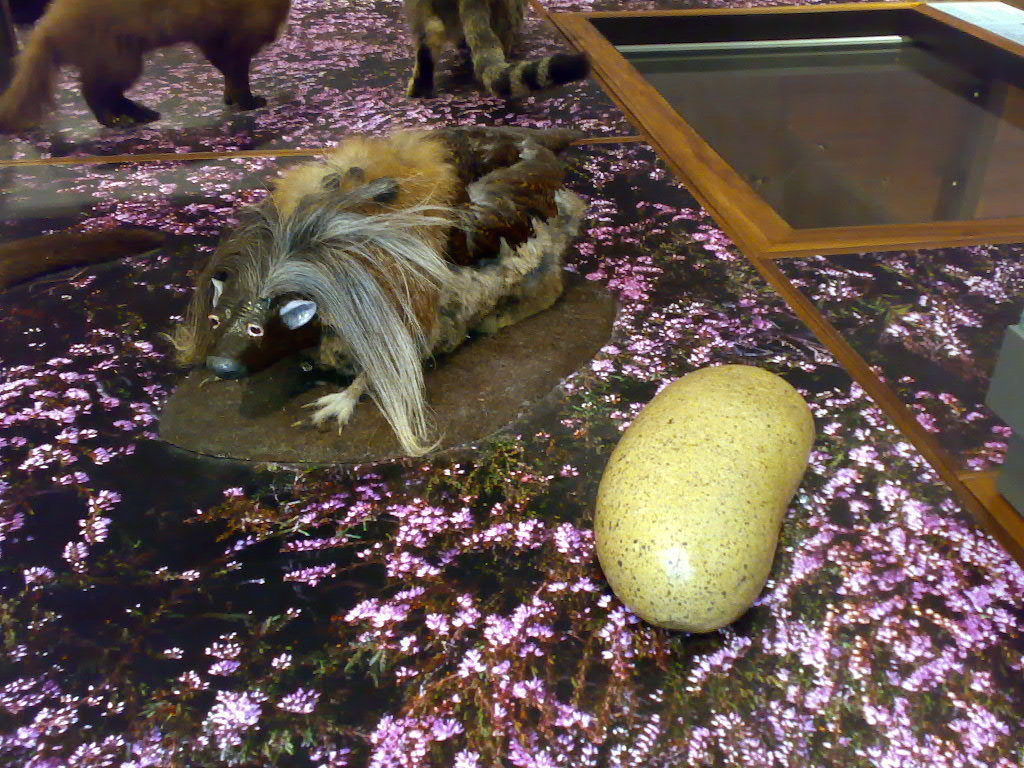
A fictitious Wild Haggis Haggis scoticus, next to a prepared specimen, as displayed at the Glasgow Kelvingrove Gallery

In the absence of hard facts as to haggis' origins, popular folklore has provided some notions. One is that the dish originates from the days of the old Scottish cattle drovers. When the men left the Highlands to drive their cattle to market in Edinburgh, the women would prepare rations for them to eat during the long journey down through the glens. They used the ingredients that were most readily available in their homes and conveniently packaged them in a sheep's stomach allowing for easy transport during the journey. Other speculations have been based on Scottish slaughtering practices. When a chieftain or laird required an animal to be slaughtered for meat (whether sheep or cattle) the workmen were allowed to keep the offal as their share.

A joke sometimes maintained is that a haggis is a small Scottish animal with longer legs on one side, so that it can run around the steep hills of the Scottish highlands, without falling over. According to one poll, 33 percent of American visitors to Scotland believed haggis to be an animal.

== Modern use ==
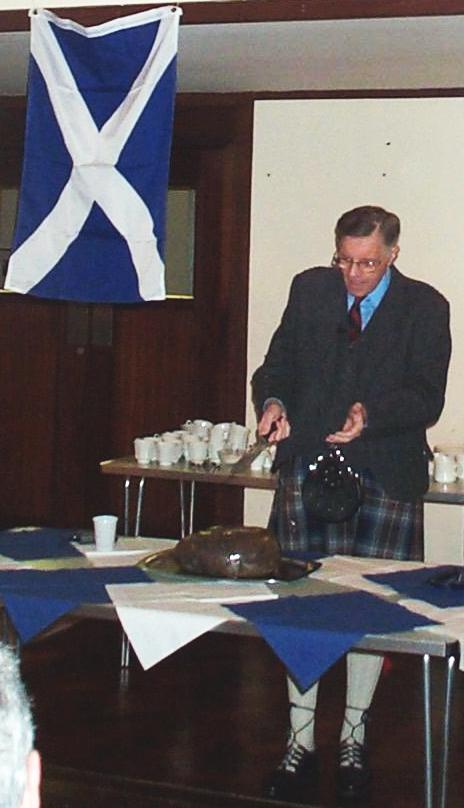
Recitation of the poem "Address to a Haggis" by Robert Burns is an important part of the Burns supper.

Haggis is traditionally served as part of the Burns supper on or near 25 January, the birthday of Scotland's national poet Robert Burns. Burns wrote the poem "Address to a Haggis", which starts "Fair fa' your honest, sonsie face, Great chieftain o' the puddin-race!" In Burns's lifetime haggis was a common dish of the poor as it was nourishing yet very cheap, being made from leftover parts of sheep otherwise discarded.

Haggis is widely available in supermarkets in Scotland all year, with cheaper brands normally packed in artificial casings, rather than stomachs. Sometimes haggis is sold in tins or a container which can be cooked in a microwave or conventional oven. Some commercial haggis is largely made from pig, rather than sheep, offal. Kosher haggis, not only pork-free but fully conformant to Jewish dietary laws, is produced.

Haggis is often served in Scottish fast-food establishments, in the shape of a large sausage and deep fried in batter. Together with chips, this comprises a "haggis supper". A "haggis burger" is a patty of fried haggis served on a bun. A "haggis pakora" is another deep fried variant, available in some Indian restaurants in Scotland. Haggis can be used as an ingredient in other dishes, even pizza, rather than the main part of a dish.

A traditional haggis recipe describes haggis as "sheep's 'pluck' (heart, liver, and lungs), minced with onion, oatmeal, suet, spices, and salt, mixed with stock, and traditionally encased in the animal's stomach and boiled". Ingredients are sheep stomach, heart and lungs of one lamb, onions, oatmeal, salt, pepper, stock, and water, with optional ingredients dried coriander, cinnamon, and nutmeg. It can be boiled, baked, or deep fried.

In the north-east of Scotland, from Aberdeen northwards, in addition to the customary neeps and tatties, haggis is commonly served with mince.

=== Vegetarian ===
Vegetarian haggis was first available commercially in 1984, and now can account for between 25% and 40% of haggis sales. It substitutes various pulses, nuts and vegetables for the meat. Oats and barley may be included as may different types of lentils, split peas, adzuki beans, kidney beans, borlotti beans, peanuts, other nuts and mushrooms, onions, and carrots.

== Outside Scotland ==
Haggis remains popular with Scottish immigrants in the United States, Canada, Australia, and New Zealand, owing to the strong influence of Scottish culture, especially for Burns Suppers. As of 2018, haggis is shipped to 7 international markets.

=== Legality ===
In 1971, it became illegal to import haggis into the US from the UK due to a ban on food containing sheep lung, which constitutes 10–15% of the traditional recipe. The ban encompasses all lungs, as fluids such as stomach acid and phlegm may enter the lung during slaughter. The situation was further complicated in 1989 when all UK beef and lamb was banned from importation to the US due to the United Kingdom BSE outbreak. The ban on importing British lamb to the US was lifted in 2022 but the ban on food containing sheep lung remained in force.

As haggis cannot be exported to the United States, it is instead made there, sometimes by Scottish companies. In one such use, which is stated to be otherwise the same 150-year-old recipe having the same ingredients as in Scotland, sheep lung is not used and the casing is artificial rather than stomach.

On 17 June 2026, Massachusetts governor Maura Healey "legalized" haggis in the state as a nod to Scotland's Word Cup bid and the notable presence of its fans, the Tartan Army, in Boston for the event. The governor jokingly signed an executive order alongside Scottish podcaster and Tartan Army fan David McIntosh Jr. However, individual states in the U.S. cannot override federal food safety and import rules.

== See also ==
- Balmoral chicken
- Black pudding
- Haggis hurling
- List of sausages
- Skirlie
- White pudding
