= Burns supper =

Annual event celebrating Robert Burns (1759–1795)

Burns Night
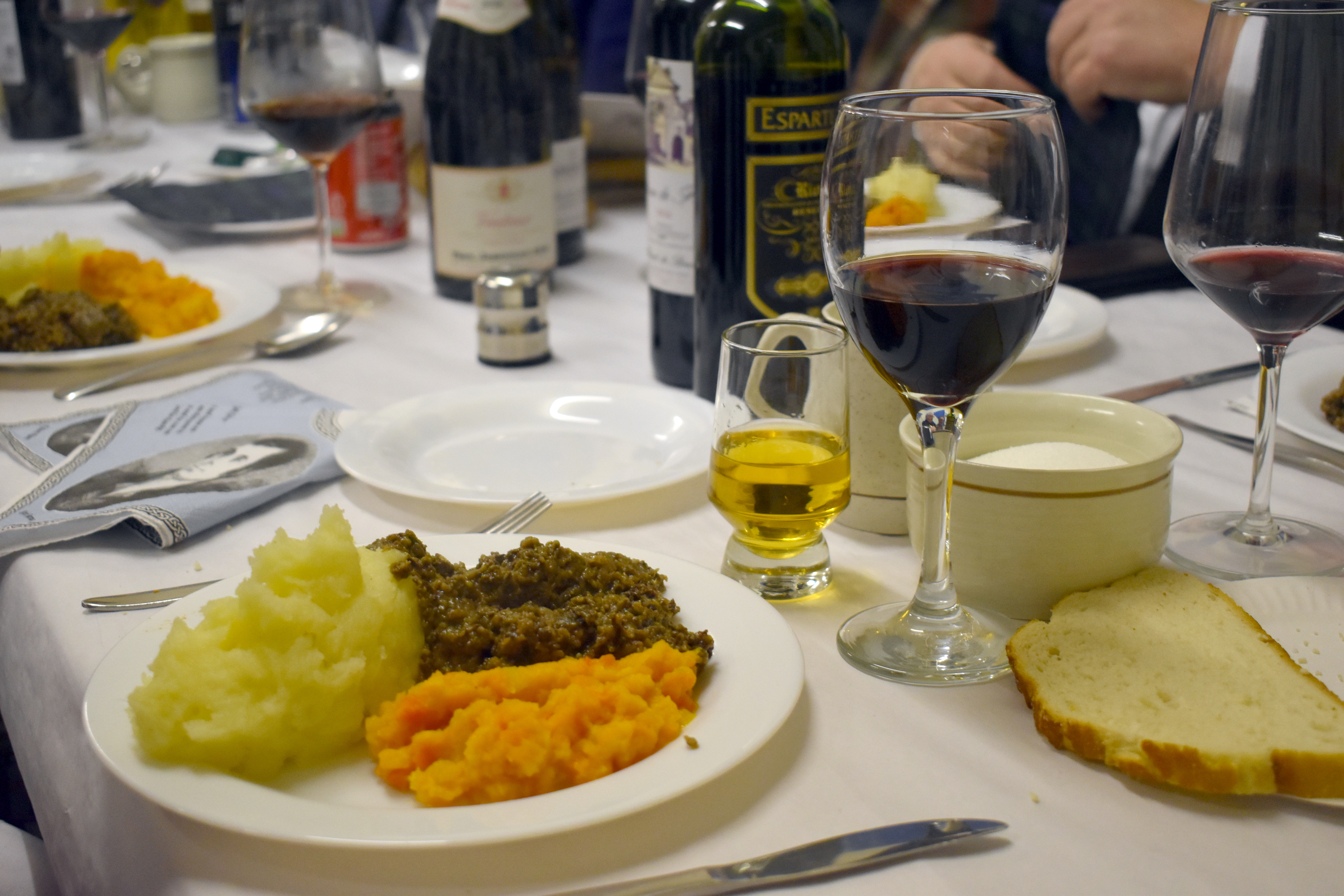
- The traditional meal of haggis, neeps and tatties at Dundee Burns Club's 160th annual Burns supper, on 25 January 2020
- Observed by: Scotland; Scots people
- Date: 25 January (traditional)
- Frequency: Annual

A Burns supper is a celebration of the life and poetry of the poet Robert Burns (25 January 1759 – 21 July 1796), the author of many Scots poems. The suppers are usually held on or near the poet's birthday, 25 January, known as Burns Night (Scots: Burns Nicht; Scottish Gaelic: Oidhche na Taigeise) also called Robert Burns Day or Rabbie Burns Day (or Robbie Burns Day in Canada). Sometimes, celebrations are also held at other times of the year. Burns suppers are held all around the world.

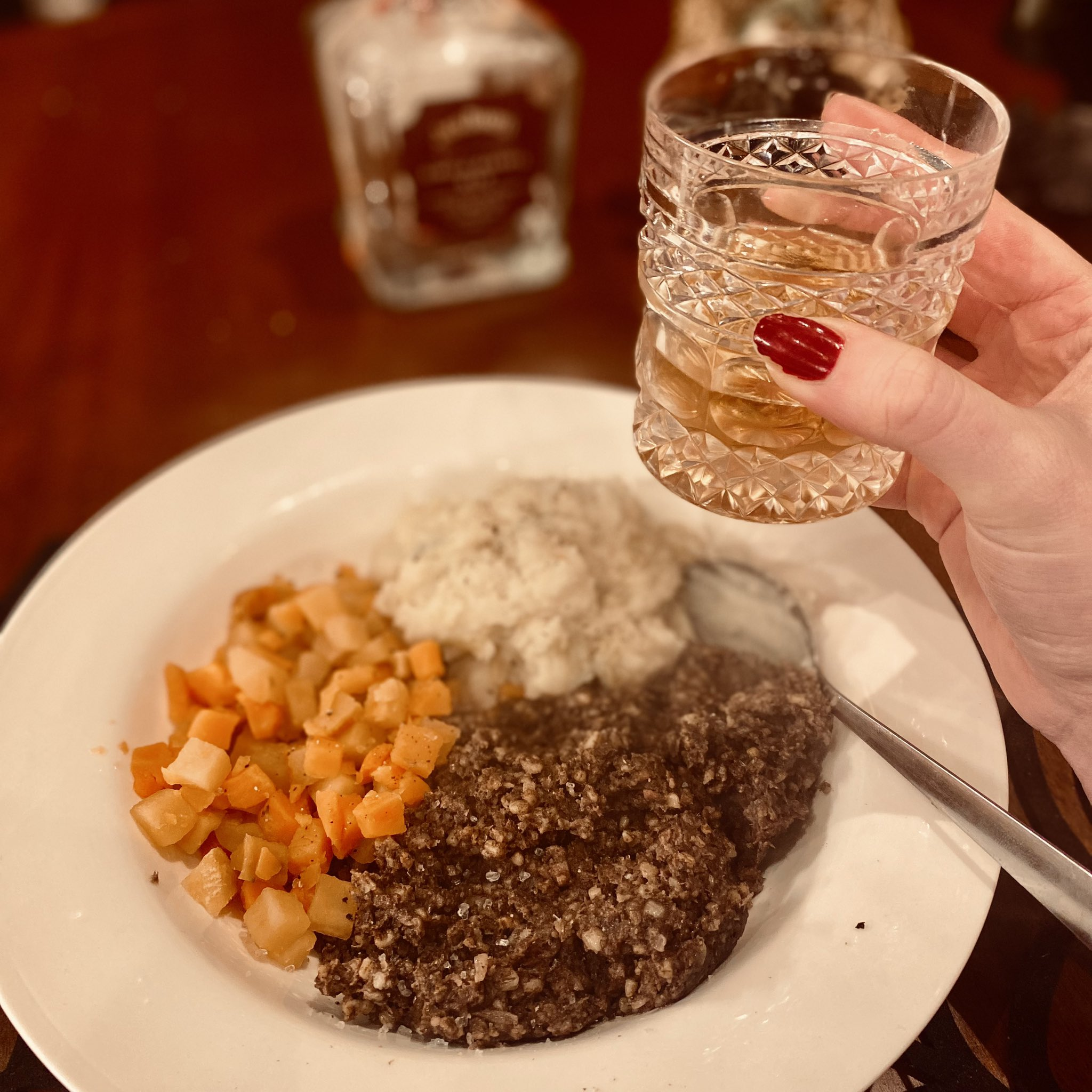
Burns supper with haggis, neeps and tatties and a glass of whisky.

== History ==
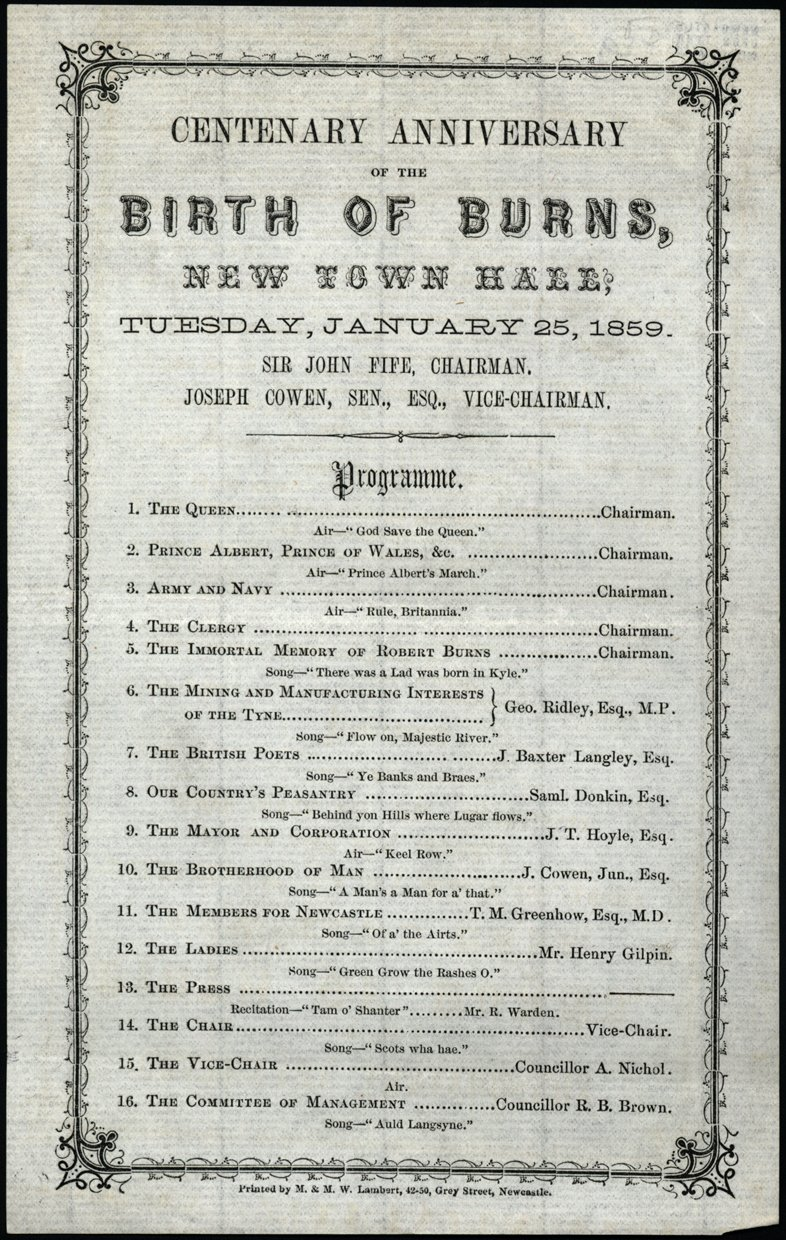
Programme for an 1859 'Birth of Burns' event, held at Newcastle upon Tyne, England (transcription)

The first supper was held in memoriam at Burns Cottage in Ayrshire by Burns's friends, on 21 July 1801, the fifth anniversary of his death. The earliest extant Burns Club was founded in Greenock in 1801 by merchants born in Ayrshire, some of whom had known Burns. They held the first Burns supper on what they thought was his birthday, 29 January 1802, but in 1803, they discovered Ayr parish records that noted his date of birth was actually 25 January 1759. Since then, suppers have been held on or about 25 January.

The Scottish Parliament considers the yearly celebration of Burns Night a key cultural heritage event.

The Parliament welcomes the annual celebration of Scotland’s national poet, Robert Burns, which is held on 25 January each year to mark the Bard’s birthday; considers that Burns was one of the greatest poets and that his work has influenced thinkers across the world; notes that Burns' first published collection, Poems Chiefly in the Scottish Dialect, also known as the "Kilmarnock Edition", published in 1786, did much to popularise and champion the Scots language, and considers that this is one of his most important legacies; believes that the celebration of Burns Night is an opportunity to raise awareness of the cultural significance of Scots and its status as one of the indigenous languages of Scotland, and further believes in the importance of the writing down of the Scots language to ensure its continuation through written documentation, as well as oral tradition.

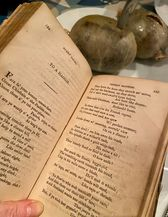
Poetry to accompany haggis eating

Burns suppers can be formal or informal. Both typically include haggis (a traditional Scottish dish celebrated by Burns in Address to a Haggis), Scotch whisky and the recitation of Burns's poetry. Formal dinners are hosted by organisations such as universities, sporting clubs, Burns Clubs, the Freemasons or St. Andrew's Societies; they occasionally end with dancing or a cèilidh. During the COVID-19 pandemic in 2021, Burns Night celebrations moved online and were popular amongst families eating at home. Formal suppers follow a standard order.

== Standard order ==
=== Piping in guests ===
A bagpiper sometimes greets the guests, who gather and mix as at any informal party. At less formal gatherings, traditional Scottish music is played.

=== Host's welcoming speech ===
The host welcomes the guests to the supper and states the occasion.

Sometimes, the song "O Flower of Scotland" is sung at the beginning.

All the guests are then seated and grace is said, usually using the "Selkirk Grace", a thanksgiving said before meals that uses the Scots language. Although attributed to Burns, the Selkirk Grace was already known in the 17th century as the "Galloway Grace" or the "Covenanters' Grace". It came to be called the Selkirk Grace because Burns was said to have delivered it at a dinner given by the 4th Earl of Selkirk.

==== Selkirk Grace ====
Some hae meat an canna eat,
And some wad eat that want it;
But we hae meat, and we can eat,
And sae the Lord be thankit.

=== Soup course ===
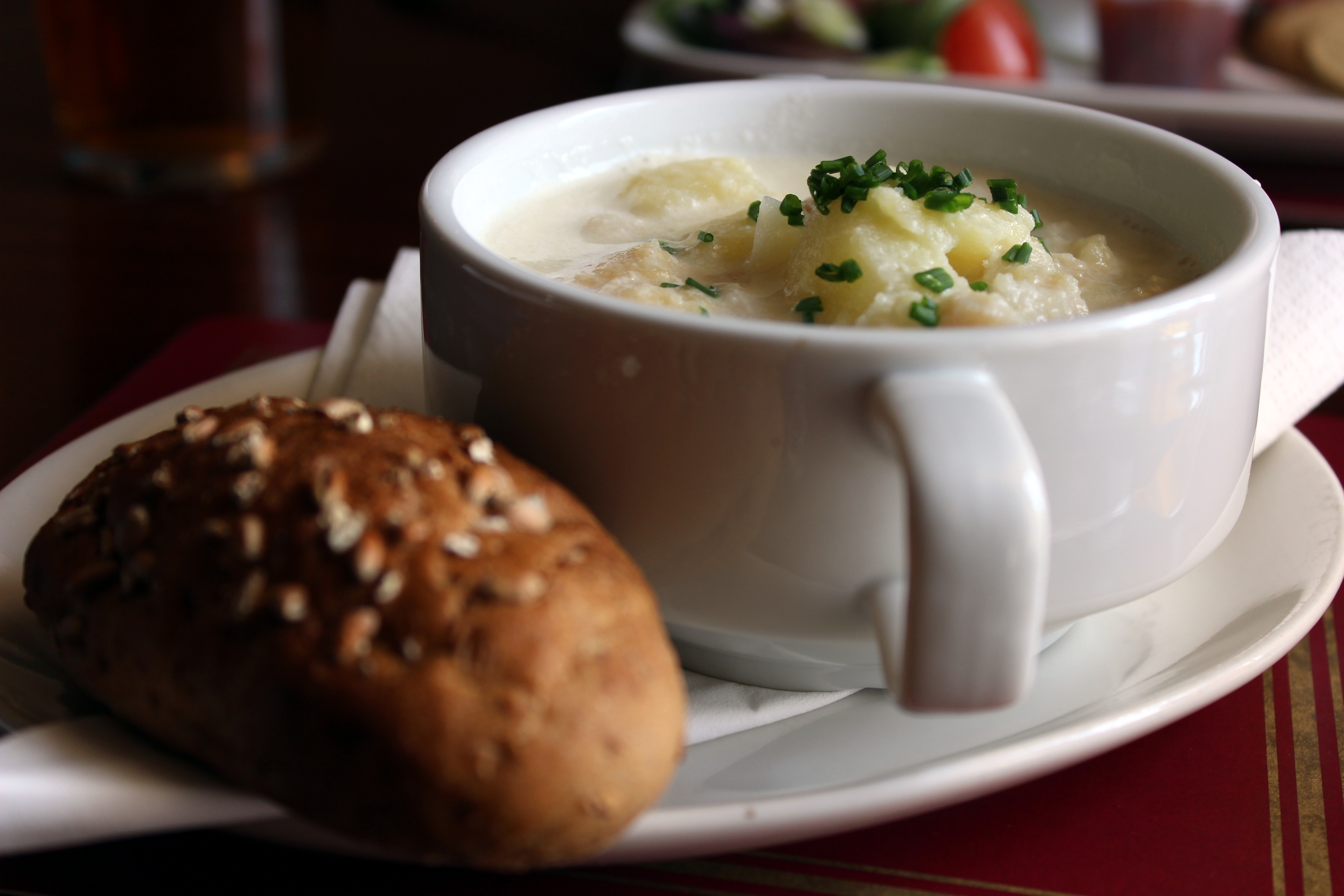
Cullen skink soup

The supper starts with the soup course, such as Scotch broth, potato soup, cullen skink, or cock-a-leekie.

=== Haggis ===
==== Piping in the haggis ====
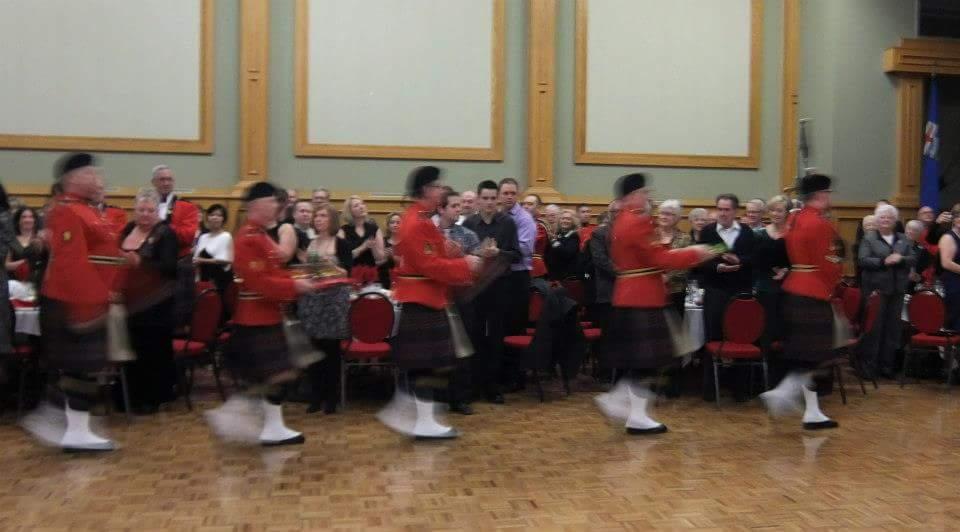
Piping in the haggis

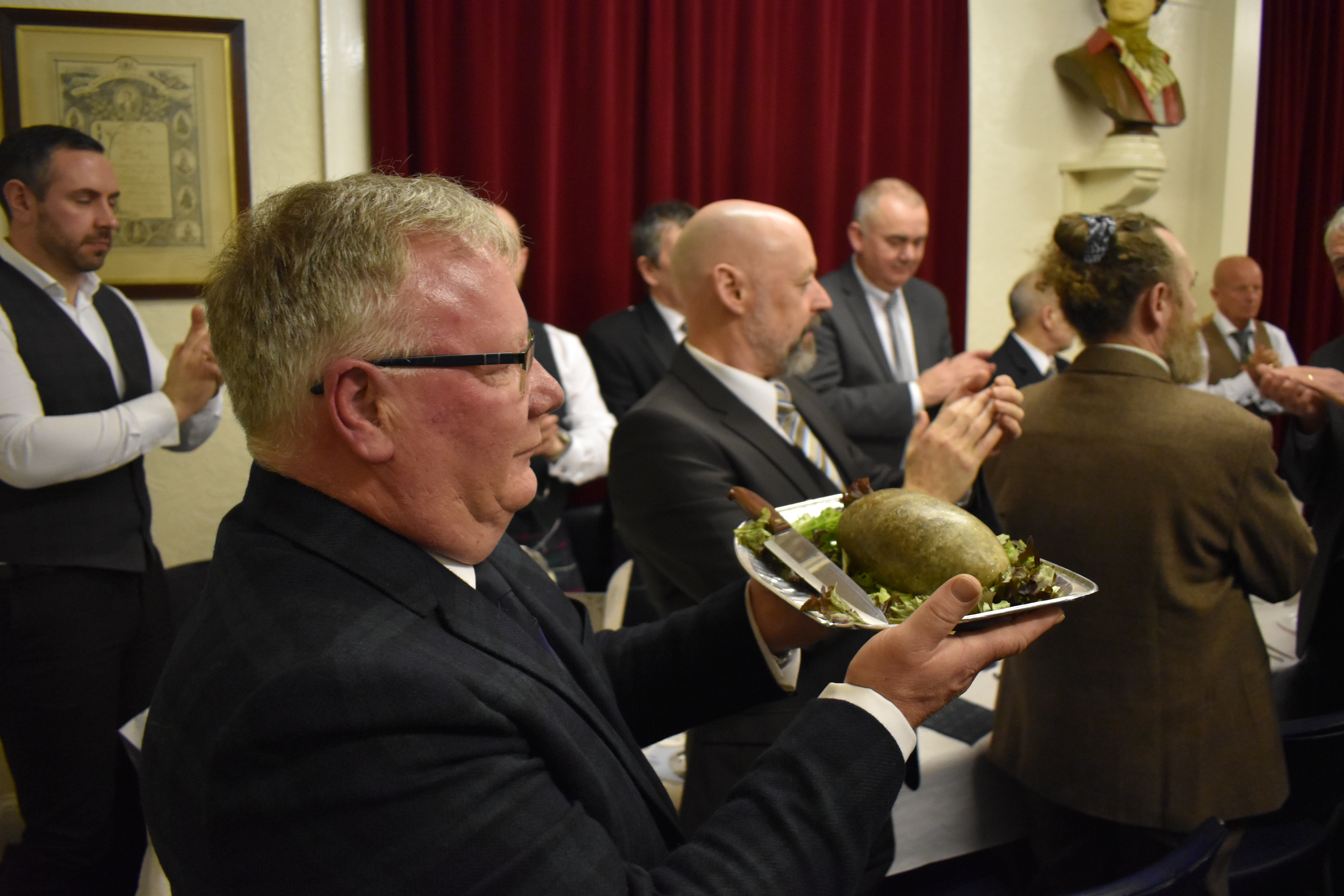
Bringing in the haggis

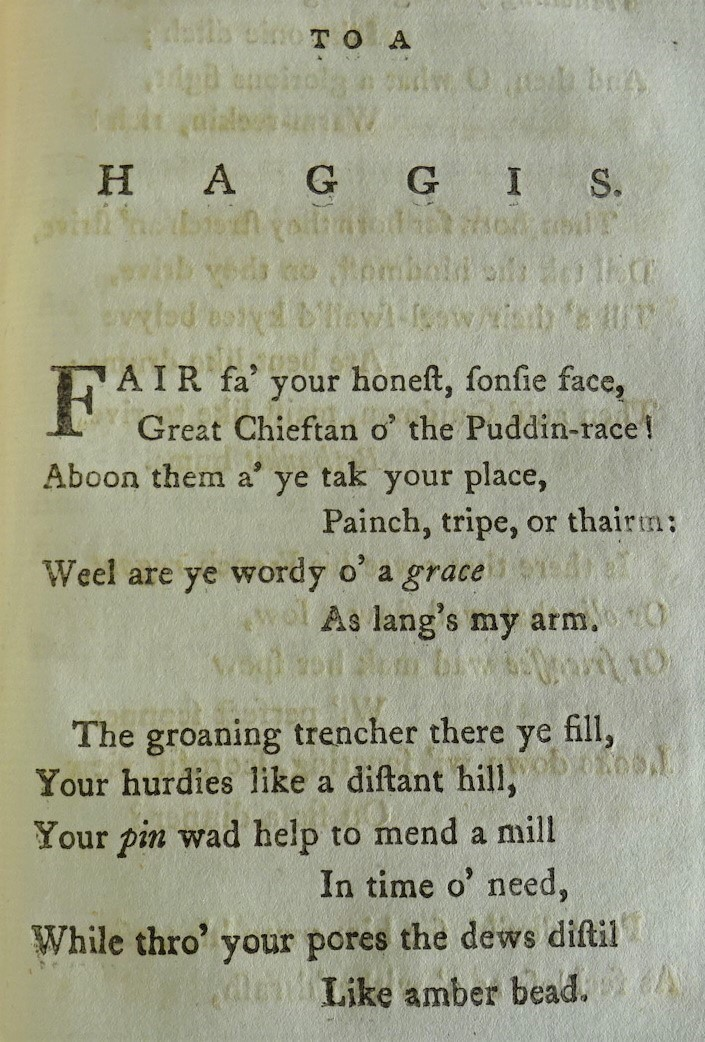
"To a Haggis" (Edinburgh Edition 1787)

Guests are asked to stand as the haggis is brought in. Haggis is a meat dish but in recent decades, a vegetarian alternative is often available. It is usually brought in by the cook on a large dish, generally while a bagpiper leads the way to the host's table, where the haggis is laid down. "A Man's A Man for A' That", "Robbie Burns Medley" or "The Star O' Robbie Burns" can be played. The host or a guest then recites the Address to a Haggis.

==== "Address to a Haggis" ====
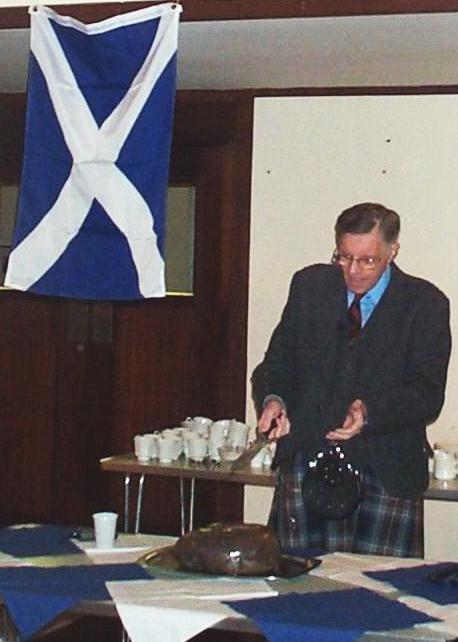
Addressing the haggis

Original text
Idiomatic translation

Fair fa' your honest, sonsie face,
Great chieftain o' the puddin-race!
Aboon them a' ye tak your place,
Painch, tripe, or thairm:
Weel are ye wordy o' a grace
As lang's my airm.

Nice seeing your honest, chubby face,
Great chieftain of the sausage race!
Above them all you take your place,
Belly, tripe, or links:
Well are you worthy of a grace
As long as my arm.

The groaning trencher there ye fill,
Your hurdies like a distant hill,
Your pin wad help to mend a mill
In time o' need,
While thro' your pores the dews distil
Like amber bead.

The groaning platter there you fill,
Your buttocks like a distant hill,
Your pin would help to mend a mill
In time of need,
While through your pores the dews distill
Like amber bead.

His knife see rustic Labour dicht,
An' cut you up wi' ready slicht,
Trenching your gushing entrails bricht,
Like ony ditch;
And then, O what a glorious sicht,
Warm-reekin, rich!

His knife see rustic Labour sharpen,
And cut you up with practiced skill,
Trenching your gushing entrails bright,
Like any ditch;
And then, Oh what a glorious sight,
Warm-steaming, rich!

Then, horn for horn, they stretch an' strive:
Deil tak the hindmaist! on they drive,
Till a' their weel-swall'd kytes belyve,
Are bent like drums;
Then auld Guidman, maist like to rive,
"Bethankit" hums.

Then, spoon for spoon, they stretch and strive:
Devil take the hindmost, on they drive,
'Til all their well-swollen bellies soon
Are tight as drums;
Then old Master, most likely to burst,
"Thanks be" hums.

Is there that o're his French ragout
Or olio that wad staw a sow,
Or fricassee wad mak her spew
Wi' perfect scunner,
Looks down wi' sneering, scornfu' view
On sic a dinner?

Is there one, that over his French ragout,
Or olio that would give pause to a sow,
Or fricassee that would make her spew
With perfect loathing,
Looks down with sneering, scornful view
On such a dinner?

Poor devil! see him ower his trash,
As feckless as a wither'd rash,
His spindle shank, a guid whip-lash,
His nieve a nit;
Thro' bloody flood or field to dash,
O how unfit!

Poor devil! See him over his trash,
As feeble as a withered rush,
His spindly leg a good whip-lash,
His fist a nit:
Through bloody flood or field to dash,
Oh how unfit!

But mark the Rustic, haggis fed,
The trembling earth resounds his tread.
Clap in his wallie nieve a blade,
He'll mak it whistle;
An' legs an' arms, an' heads will sned,
Like taps o' thristle.

But mark the Rustic, haggis-fed,
The trembling earth resounds his tread,
Clap in his sturdy fist a blade,
He'll make it whistle;
And legs and arms, and heads will cut,
Like tops of thistle.

Ye Pow'rs wha mak mankind your care,
And dish them out their bill o' fare,
Auld Scotland wants nae skinkin ware
That jaups in luggies;
But, if ye wish her gratefu' prayer,
Gie her a haggis!

You Pow'rs, that make mankind your care,
And dish them out their bill of fare,
Old Scotland wants no watery ware
That slops in bowls:
But, if You wish her grateful prayer,
Give her a Haggis!

At the line His knife see rustic Labour dicht, the speaker normally draws and sharpens a knife. At the line An' cut you up wi' ready slicht, he plunges it into the haggis and cuts it open from end to end. When done properly, the "ceremony" is a highlight of the evening.

=== Main course ===
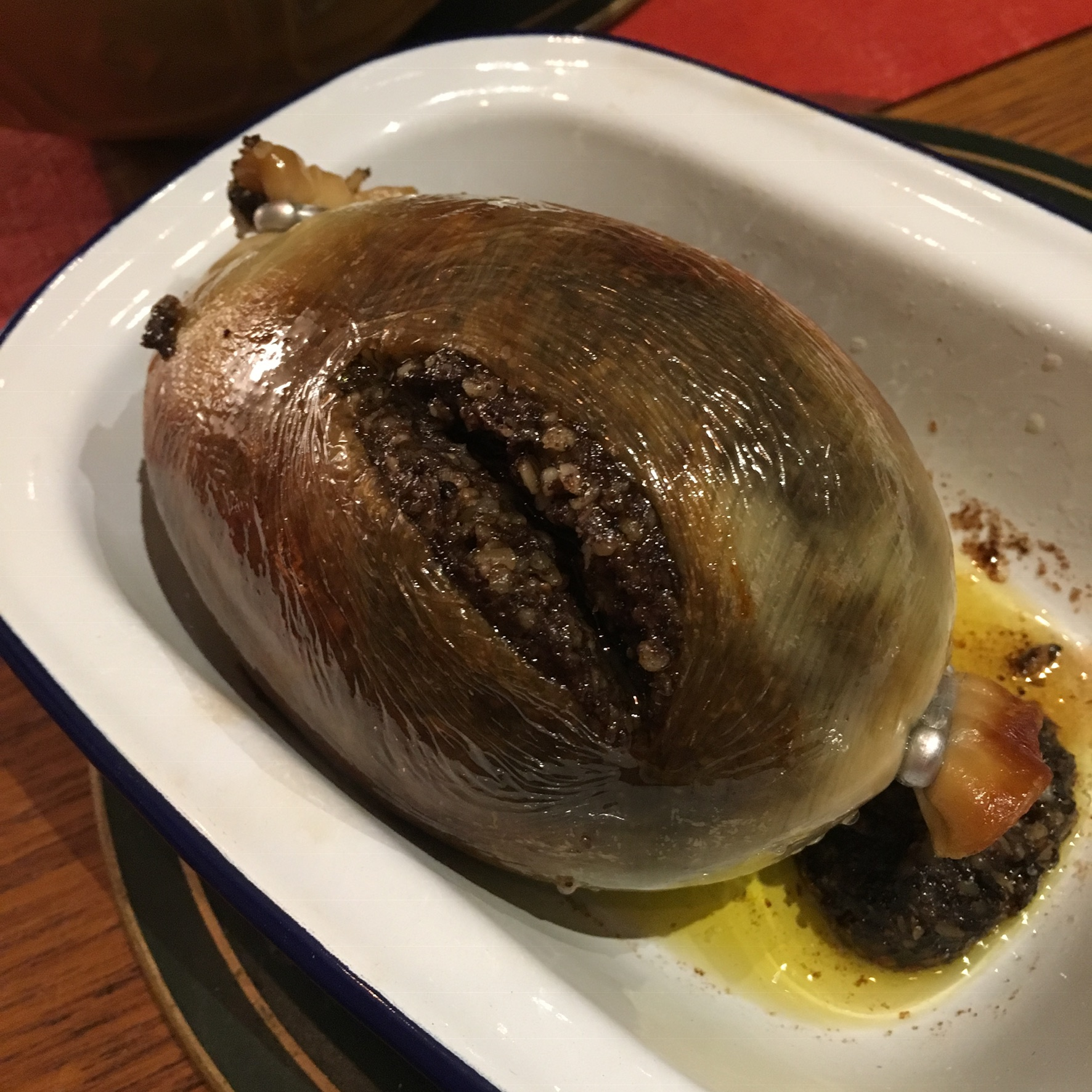
A cooked haggis

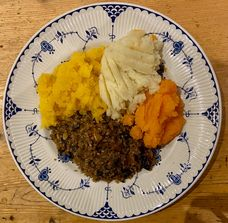
Haggis, neeps and tatties on a plate.

At the end of the poem, a whisky toast will be proposed to the haggis, and the company will sit down to the meal. The haggis is traditionally served with mashed potatoes (tatties) and mashed swede turnip (neeps).

=== Other courses ===
A dessert course, cheese courses, and coffee may also be part of the meal. The courses normally use traditional Scottish recipes. For instance, dessert may be cranachan or tipsy laird (whisky trifle), followed by oatcakes and cheese, all washed down with the "water of life" (uisge beatha), Scotch whisky.

=== Toasts ===
When the meal reaches the coffee stage, speeches and toasts are given.

==== Immortal memory ====
The main speaker gives a speech remembering some aspect of Burns's life or poetry. It may be either light-hearted or serious, and may include the recitation of a poem or a song by Burns. A toast to the Immortal Memory of Robert Burns then follows.

==== Address to the Lassies ====
This was originally a short speech given by a male guest in thanks to the women who had prepared the meal. However, it is now much more wide-ranging and generally covers the male speaker's view on women. The men drink a toast to the women's health.

==== Reply to the Laddies ====
This is occasionally (and humorously) called the "Toast to the Laddies". Like the previous toast, it is generally now quite wide-ranging. A female guest will give her views on men and reply to any specific points raised by the previous speaker. Quite often, the speakers giving this toast and the previous one will collaborate so that the two toasts complement each other.

=== Works by Burns ===
After the speeches there may be singing of songs by Burns (such as "Ae Fond Kiss", "Such a Parcel of Rogues in a Nation", and "A Man's A Man for A' That") and more poetry (such as "To a Mouse", "To a Louse", "Tam o' Shanter", "The Twa Dogs", and "Holy Willie's Prayer").

That may be done by the individual guests or by invited experts. It may include other works by poets influenced by Burns, particularly poets writing in Scots.

=== Closing ===
Finally, the host will call on one of the guests to give the vote of thanks. Then, everyone is asked to stand, join hands, and sing "Auld Lang Syne".

== See also ==
- Burns' Day storm
- List of dining events
- Scottish cuisine
