= Oatmeal =

Preparation of oat groats

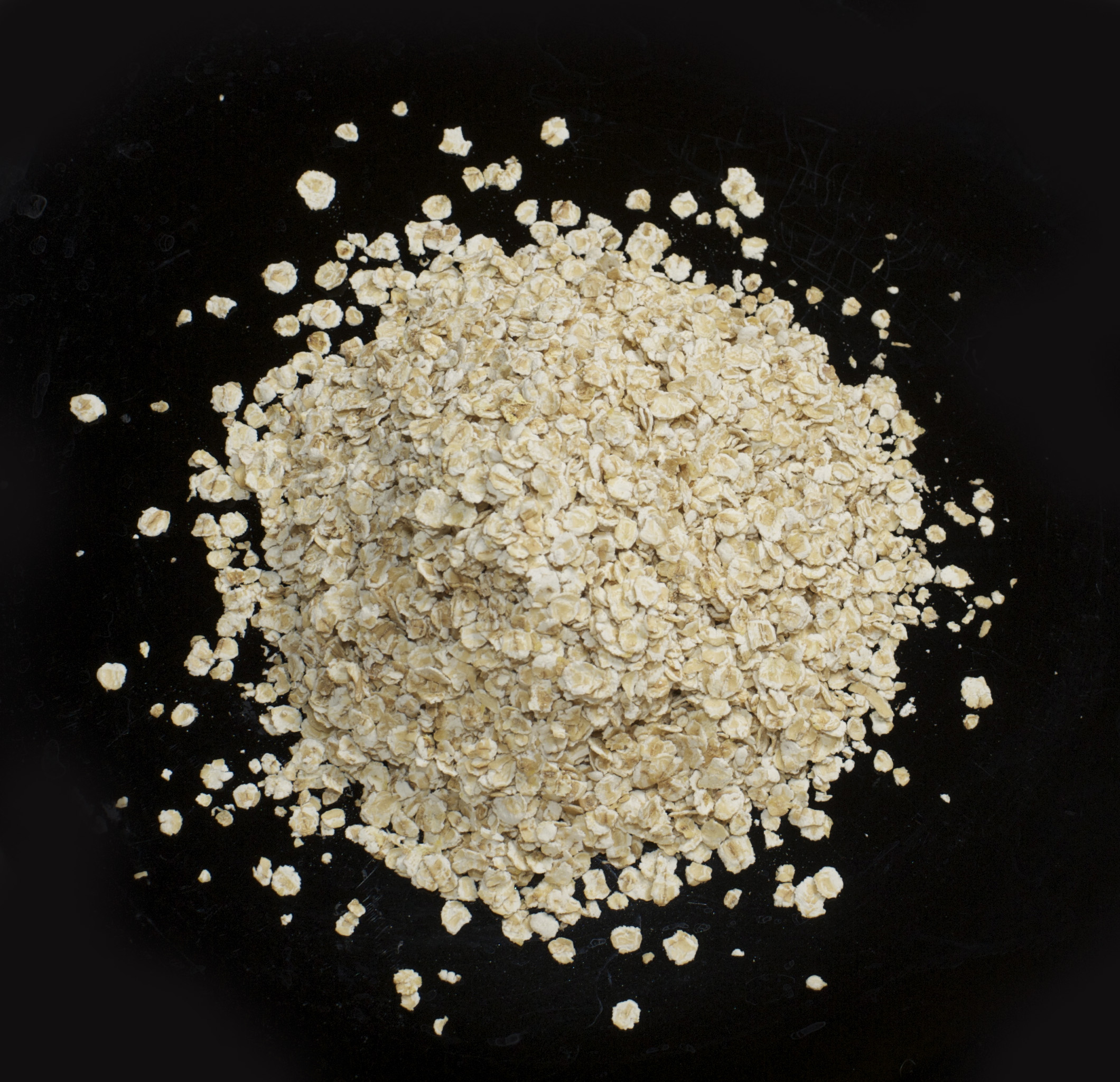
- Rolled oats (uncooked)
- Alternative names: White oats
- Main ingredients: Oat groats

Oatmeal is a preparation of oats that have been dehusked, steamed, and flattened, or a coarse flour of hulled oat grains (groats) that have either been milled (ground), rolled, or steel-cut. Ground oats are also called white oats. Steel-cut oats are known as coarse oatmeal, Irish oatmeal, or pinhead oats. Rolled oats were traditionally thick old-fashioned oats, but they can be made thinner or smaller and may be categorized as quick oatmeal or instant oatmeal depending on the cooking time required, which is determined by the size of the oats and the amount of precooking.

== Industrial preparation and varieties ==
The oat grains are dehusked by impact, and are then heated and cooled to stabilize the groats, the seed inside the husk. The groats may be milled to produce fine, medium, or coarse oatmeal.

Rolled oats are oats that have been steamed, flattened by a "flaking roller", and dried. Old-fashioned rolled oats are made from whole oat groats and may be thick and require longer cooking time. Quick-cooking rolled oats are made from steel-cut oats and rolled somewhat thinner. Instant oatmeal is made from more finely cut oats and rolled even thinner, often with a sweetener and flavorings added.

== Food uses ==
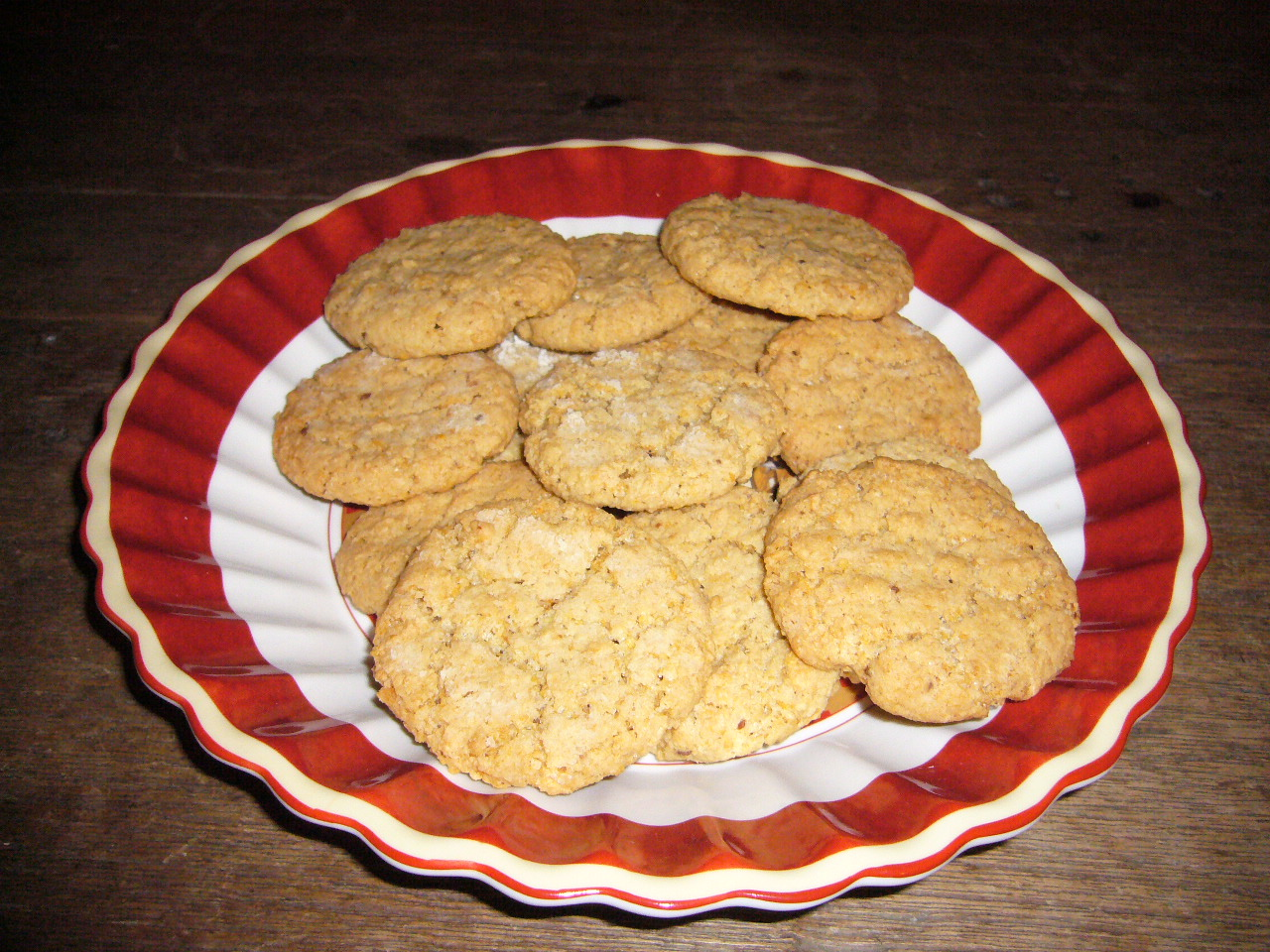
Oatmeal cookies made with oatmeal, flour, sugar and butter

Unenriched oatmeal, cooked with water
Nutritional value per 100 g (3.5 oz)
- Energy: 297 kJ (71 kcal)
- Carbohydrates: 12 g
- Sugars: 0.3
- Dietary fiber: 1.7 g
- Fat: 1.5 g
- Protein: 2.5 g
Vitamins and minerals
Vitamins	Quantity %DV^{†}
Vitamin A equiv.	0% 0 μg
Thiamine (B1)	7% 0.08 mg
Riboflavin (B2)	2% 0.02 mg
Niacin (B3)	1% 0.23 mg
Pantothenic acid (B5)	4% 0.197 mg
Vitamin B6	0% 0.005 mg
Folate (B9)	2% 6 μg
Vitamin C	0% 0 mg
Vitamin E	1% 0.08 mg
Vitamin K	0% 0.3 μg
Minerals	Quantity %DV^{†}
Calcium	1% 9 mg
Iron	5% 0.9 mg
Magnesium	6% 27 mg
Manganese	26% 0.6 mg
Phosphorus	6% 77 mg
Potassium	2% 70 mg
Sodium	0% 4 mg
Zinc	9% 1 mg
- Other constituents: Quantity
- Water: 83.6
- Link to USDA Database entry
- ^{†}Percentages estimated using US recommendations for adults, except for potassium, which is estimated based on expert recommendation from the National Academies.

All types of rolled oats may be eaten uncooked, as in muesli, or cooked with water or milk to make porridge. In some countries, rolled oats are eaten raw or toasted with milk and sugar, sometimes with raisins added, as in muesli. The term oatmeal sometimes refers to a porridge made from the bran or fibrous husk as well as from the kernel or groat. Rolled oats are often used as a key ingredient in granola, in which toasted oats are blended with sugar and/or nuts and raisins, and in granola bars.

Rolled oats are also used as an ingredient in oatmeal cookies, oatcakes, British flapjack bars, and baked oatmeal dessert dishes, such as apple Brown Betty and apple crisp. Oats may also be added to foods as an accent, as in the topping on many oat bran breads and as the coating on Caboc cheese. Oatmeal is also used as a thickening agent in savory Arabic or Egyptian meat-and-vegetable soups, and sometimes as a way of adding relatively low-cost fibre and nutritional content to meatloaf.

=== Nutrition ===
Unenriched oatmeal, cooked by boiling or microwaving, is 84% water, 12% carbohydrates, including 2% dietary fiber, and 2% each of protein and fat (table). In a reference amount of 100 g (3.5 oz), cooked oatmeal supplies 71 calories and a rich content (20% or more of the Daily Value, DV) of manganese, with no other micronutrients at significant levels (table).

=== Health effects ===
Oatmeal and other oat products were the subject of a 1997 ruling by the Food and Drug Administration that consuming oat bran or whole rolled oats can lower the risk of heart disease when combined with a low-fat diet via the effect of oat beta-glucan to reduce levels of blood cholesterol. A similar conclusion was reached in 2010 by the European Food Safety Authority.

A 2023 review found oat consumption can significantly lower blood pressure.

== Regional variations ==
=== Ireland ===
In Ireland, stirabout (Irish: leite) was formerly a staple food, made by stirring oatmeal into boiling water or milk to form a thin soup. It could be flavoured with cream, sugar, butter, salt, honey, seeds or fruit on top.

Because of its cheapness, and the ease with which it could be prepared in large quantities, stirabout was widely served in institutions like prisons, boarding schools, convents, and workhouses. For example, in 1863, children in workhouses received stirabout for their breakfast: made of half oats and half cornmeal, each child got 5 oz (140 g) of meal and 0.5 imp pt (0.28 L) of milk. Similarly, in 1891, district asylum inmates got 6–8 oz (170–230 g) of meal in stirabout every morning. Similarly, in the 20th century, prisoners got between 0.5 imp pt (0.28 L) and 1 imp pt (0.57 L) of stirabout for breakfast in many Irish jails.

=== Scotland ===
Oatmeal has a long history in Scottish culinary tradition because oats are better suited than wheat to the country's low temperatures and high humidity. As a result, oats became the staple grain of Scotland. The ancient universities of Scotland had a holiday called Meal Monday to permit students to return to their farms and collect more oats for food.

Samuel Johnson referred, disparagingly, to this in his dictionary definition for oats: "A grain, which in England is generally given to horses, but in Scotland supports the people." His biographer, James Boswell, noted that Lord Elibank was said by Sir Walter Scott to have retorted, "Yes, and where else will you see such horses and such men?"

In Scotland, oatmeal is created by grinding oats into a coarse powder. It may be ground fine, medium, or coarse, or rolled, or the groats may be chopped in two or three pieces to make what is described as pinhead oatmeal. Ground oatmeal, rolled oats, and pinhead oatmeal are all used throughout Britain; one Scots manufacturer describes varieties as "Scottish Porridge Oats" (rolled), "Scottish Oatmeal" (medium ground), and "Pinhead Oatmeal". The main uses are:

- Traditional porridge
- Brose: a thick mixture made with uncooked oatmeal (or medium oatmeal that has been dry toasted by stirring it around in a dry pot over heat until it turns a slightly darker shade and emits a sweet, nutty fragrance) and then adding butter or cream. Quick-cooking rolled oats (distinct from "instant" variations) are often used for this purpose nowadays because they are quicker to prepare.
- Gruel, made by mixing oatmeal with cold water that is strained and heated for the benefit of infants and people recovering from illness.
- as an ingredient in baking
- in the manufacture of bannocks or oatcakes
- as a stuffing for poultry
- as a coating for Caboc cheese
- as the main ingredient of the Scottish dish skirlie, or its chip-shop counterpart, the deep-fried thickly-battered mealy pudding
- mixed with sheep's blood, salt, and pepper to make Highland black pudding (marag dubh)
- mixed with fat, water, onions, and seasoning, and boiled in a sheep's intestine to make marag geal, Outer Hebridean white pudding, served sliced with fried eggs at breakfast. A sweeter version with dried fruit is also known.
- as a major component of haggis
- in sowans, not strictly made from the meal but as a porridge-like dish made from the fermented inner husks of oats

=== Staffordshire ===
Staffordshire oatcakes are a local component of the full English breakfast. It is a plate-sized pancake, made with medium oatmeal and wheatmeal (flour), along with yeast. Once the mixture has risen, it is ladled onto a griddle or bakestone and dried through. Staffordshire oatcakes are commonly paired with bacon, sausages, mushrooms, kidney, and baked beans, among others. A related oatcake is sometimes found in neighbouring Derbyshire.

=== The Netherlands, the Nordic countries, the Baltics and Russia ===
Throughout the Netherlands, the Nordic countries, the Baltic states and Russia, oatmeal porridge made from rolled oats and water or milk is a traditional breakfast staple. Known under various local names meaning 'oat porridge', 'oat flake porridge' or 'oatmeal porridge', it is normally made either savoury or sweet by adding salt or sugar, and it is often eaten with added nuts, raisins or dried fruits as well as spices, most commonly cinnamon. Local names for the porridge include Dutch havermoutpap, Swedish havregrynsgröt, Danish havregrød, Norwegian havregrøt or havregraut, Icelandic hafragrautur, Finnish kaurapuuro, Estonian kaerahelbepuder, Latvian auzu pārslu (putra), Lithuanian avižinių dribsnių košė, Polish owsianka and Russian овсянка (ovsyanka).

Oatmeal porridge has a long tradition in these regions, but during the Middle Ages porridge made from rye or barley was even more common in at least some parts of the area.

=== United States ===
In the United States, oatmeal is often served as a porridge with milk or cream and a sweetener, such as brown sugar, honey, or maple syrup. The term oatmeal is used in American English to mean porridge. It may include additional ingredients such as peanut butter, cinnamon, or various types of fruits.

=== Nigeria ===
In Nigeria, a common oatmeal dish known as zimbuleh is eaten during the winter months. Traditionally it is sweetened with raw honey and cardamom. In the Eket and Kwa Ibo regions it is often served alongside warm milk, and it is customary to pour the milk into the porridge just before eating.

== Gallery ==
Food preparations using oatmeal
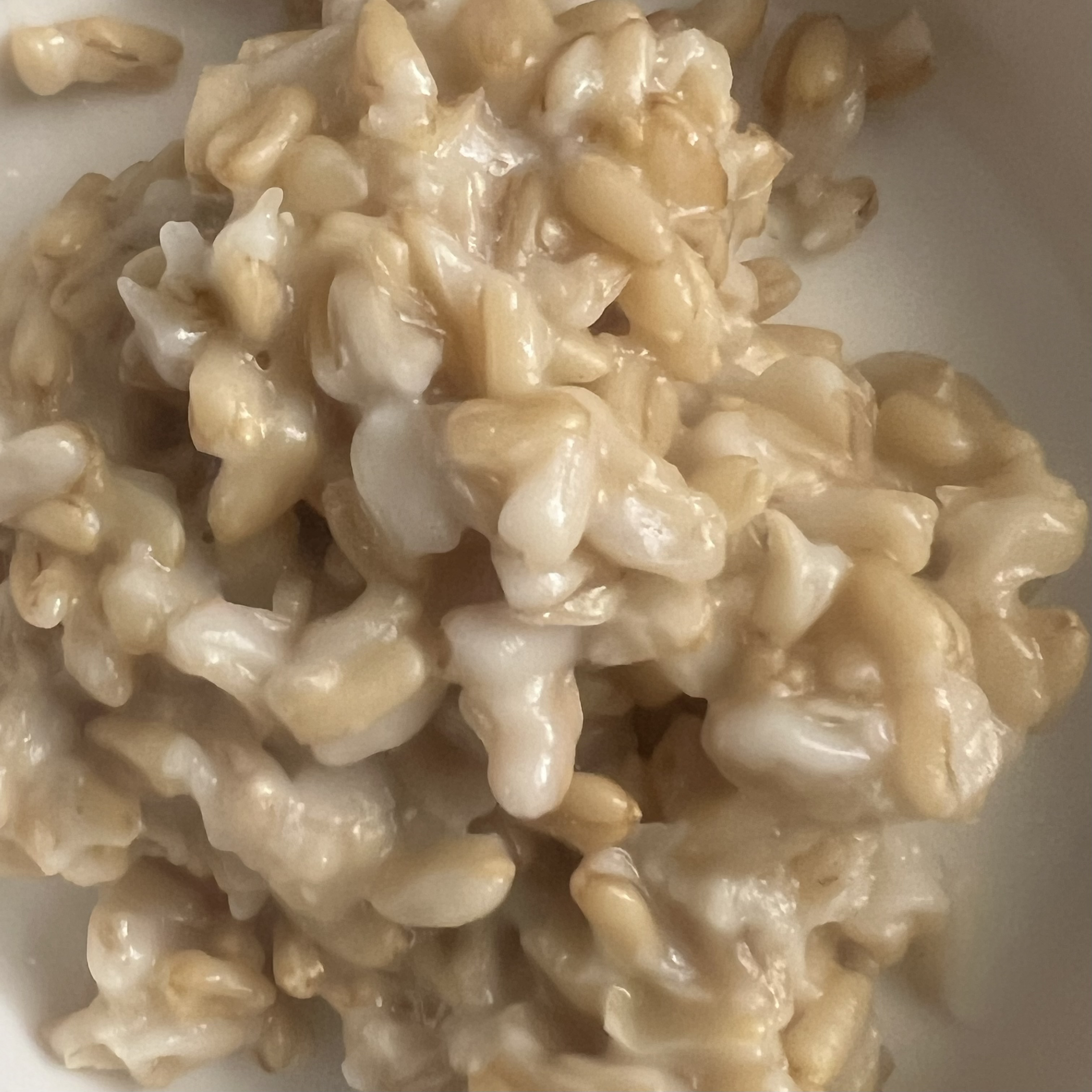
Cooked oat groats

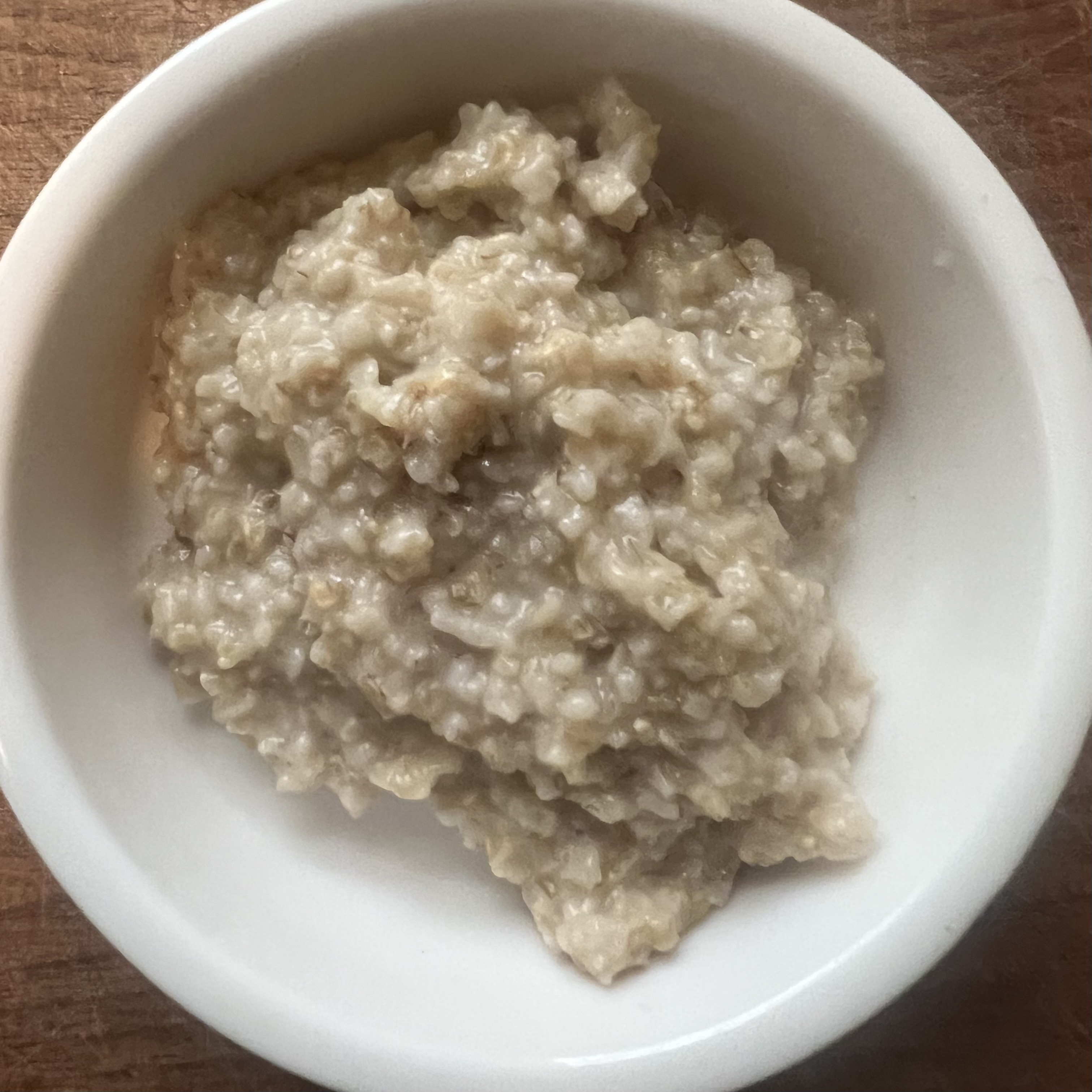
Cooked steel-cut oats

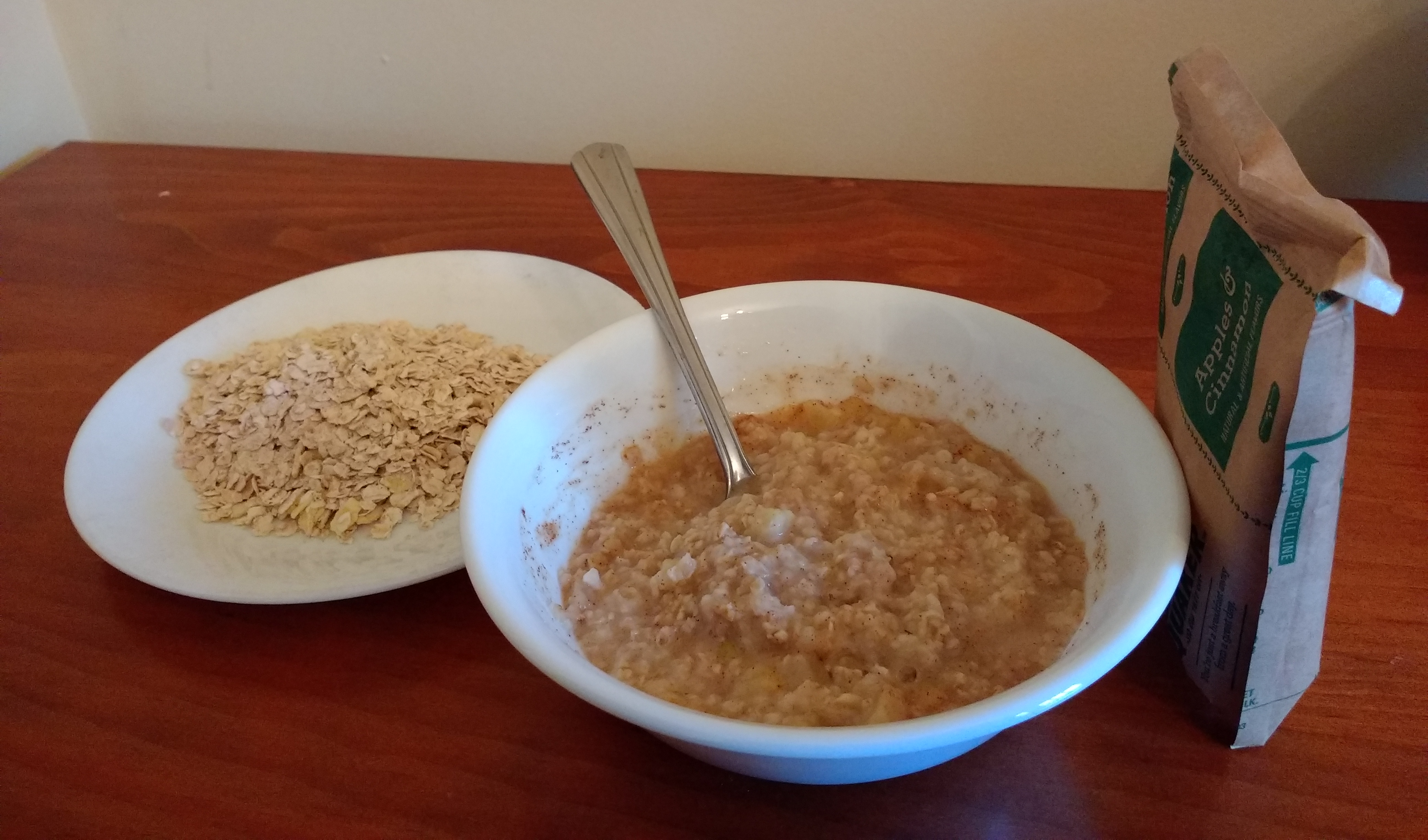
Quaker-brand single-serving flavoured "instant" oatmeal packet to make a quick oat porridge

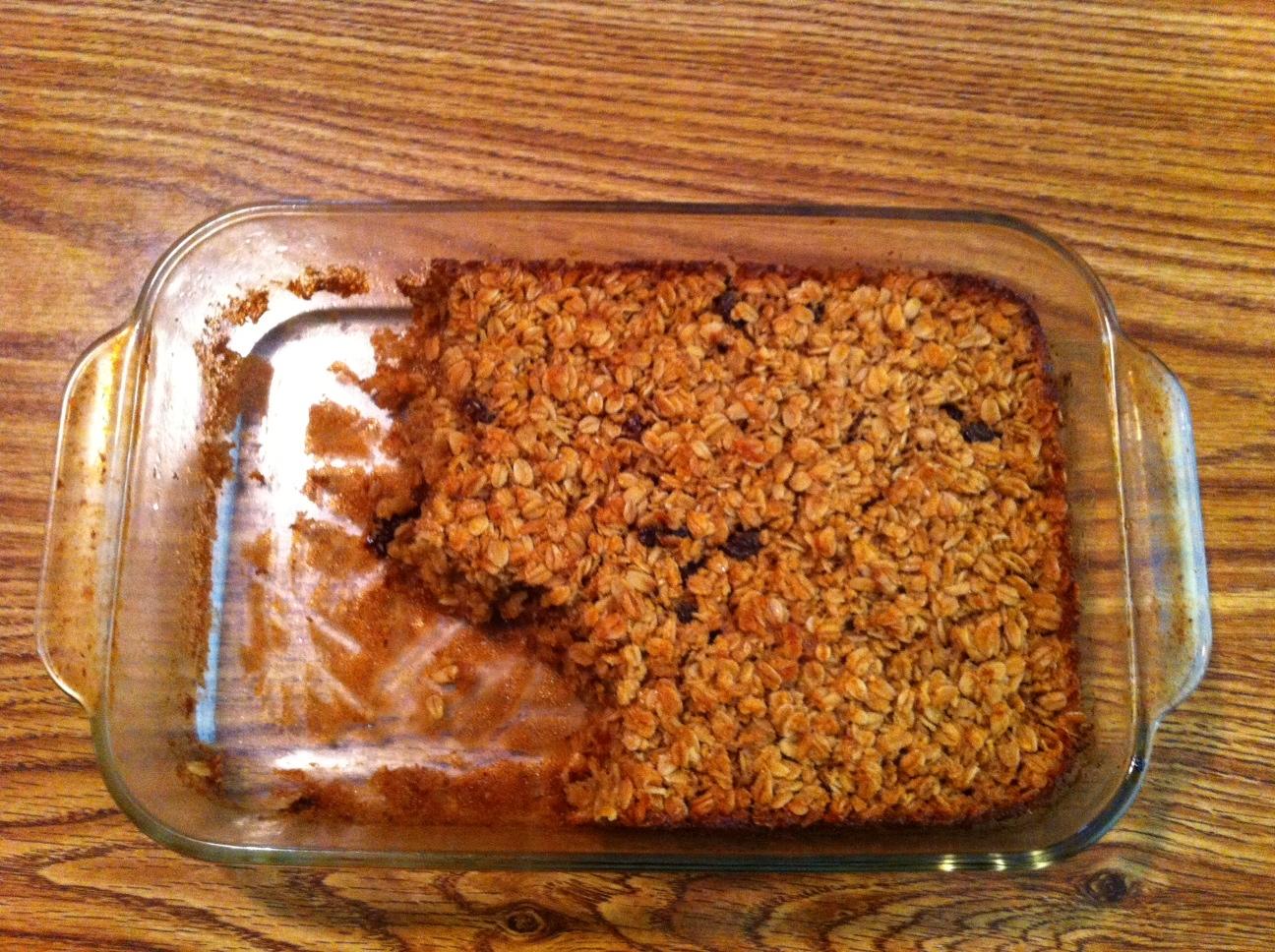
Baked oatmeal in a dish

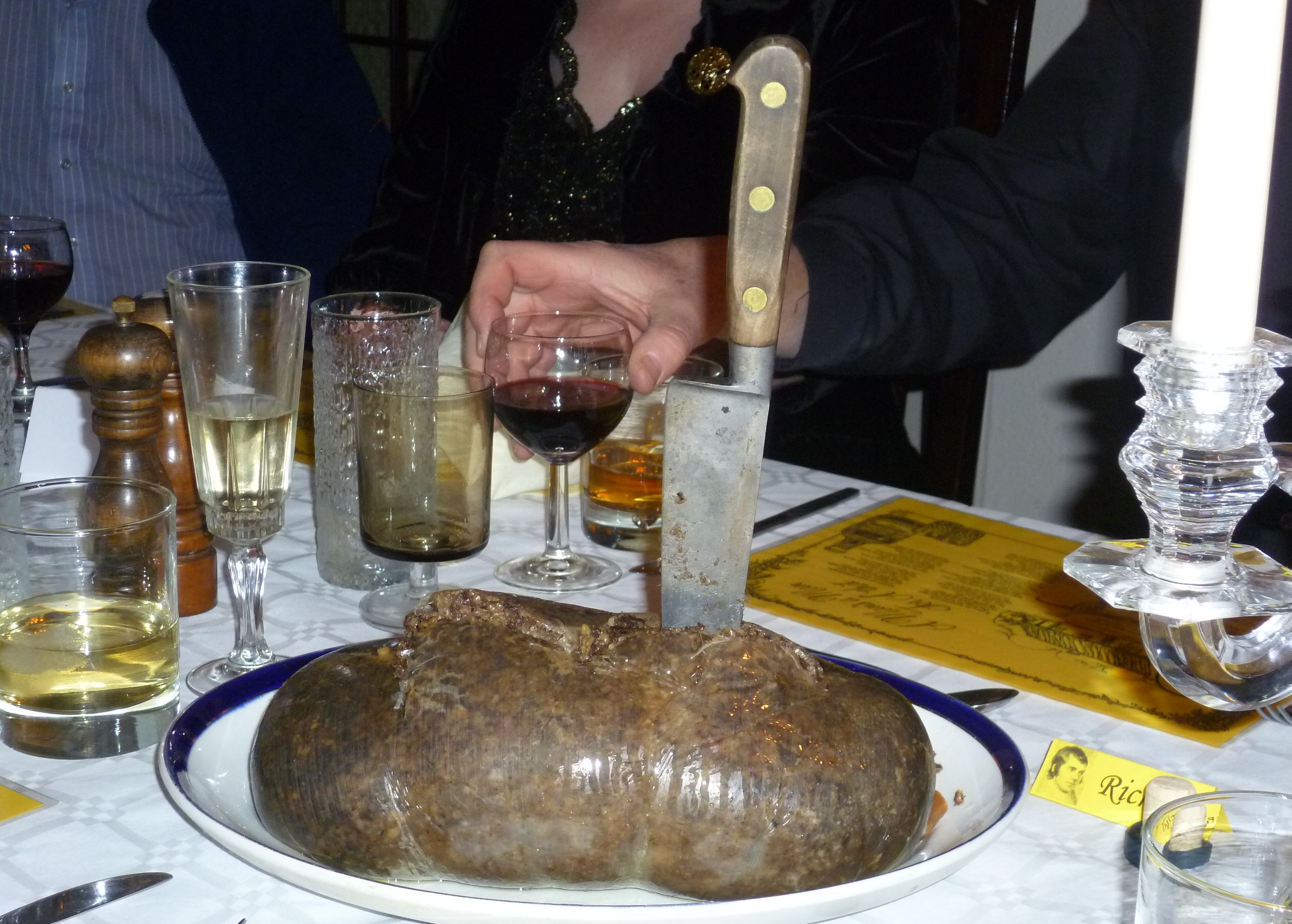
Oatmeal is a prime ingredient of haggis, seen here at a Burns supper.

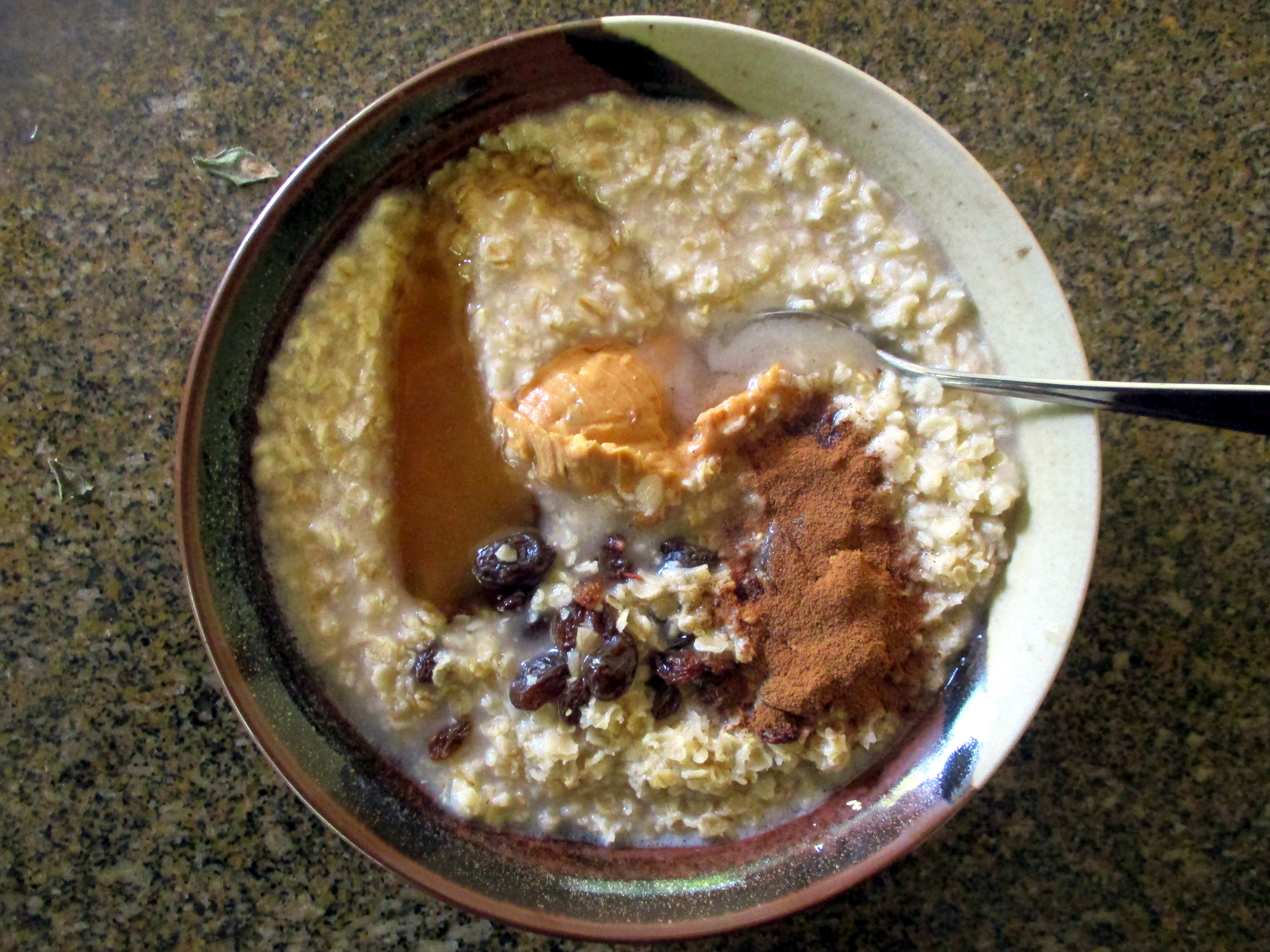
Porridge made from 1-minute quick-cooking rolled oats with raisins, peanut butter, honey, and cinnamon

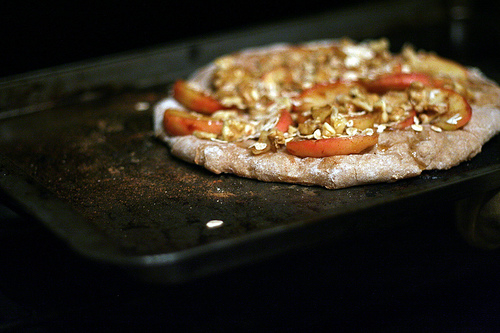
Apple oatmeal pizza

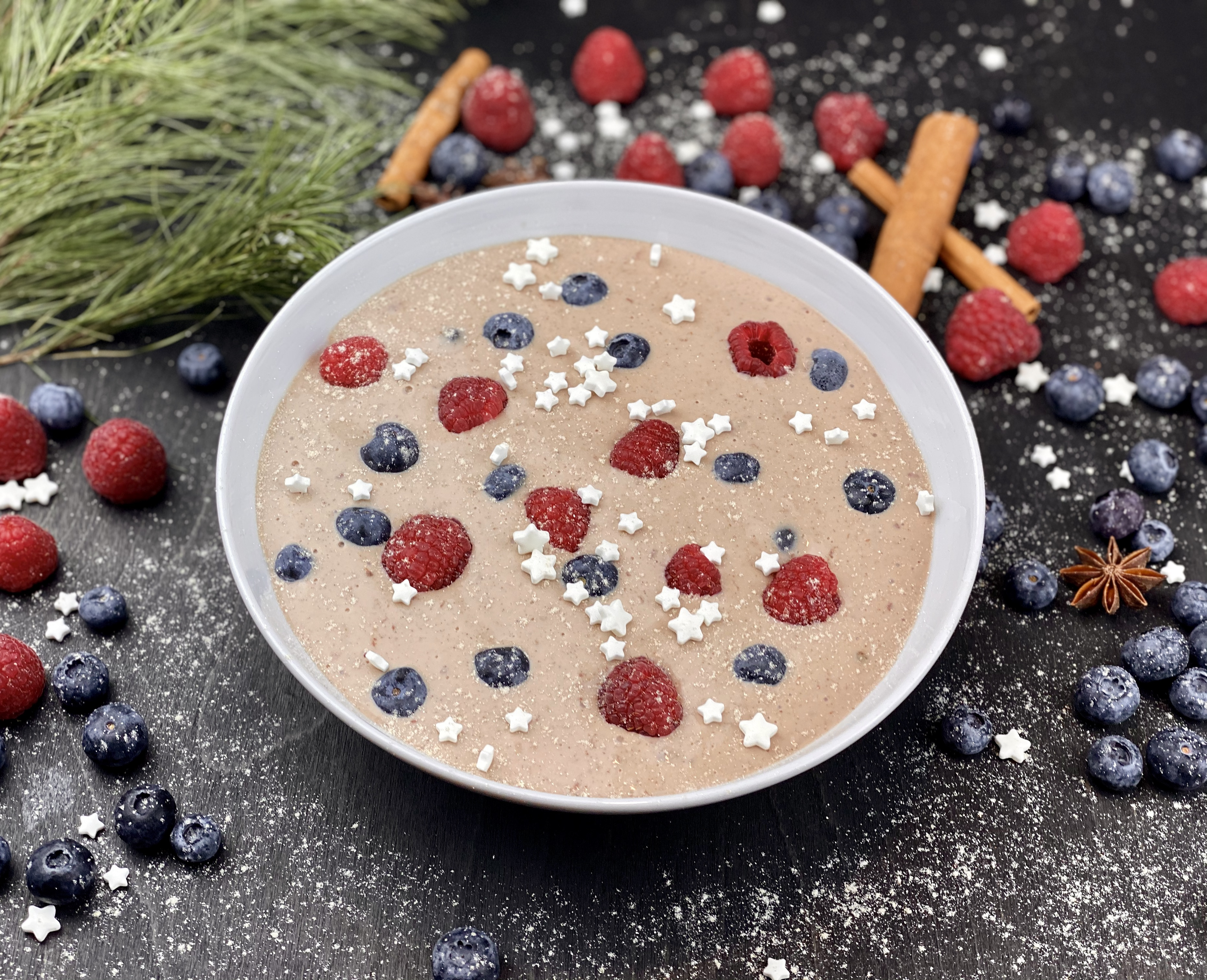
Finely ground oatmeal with berries

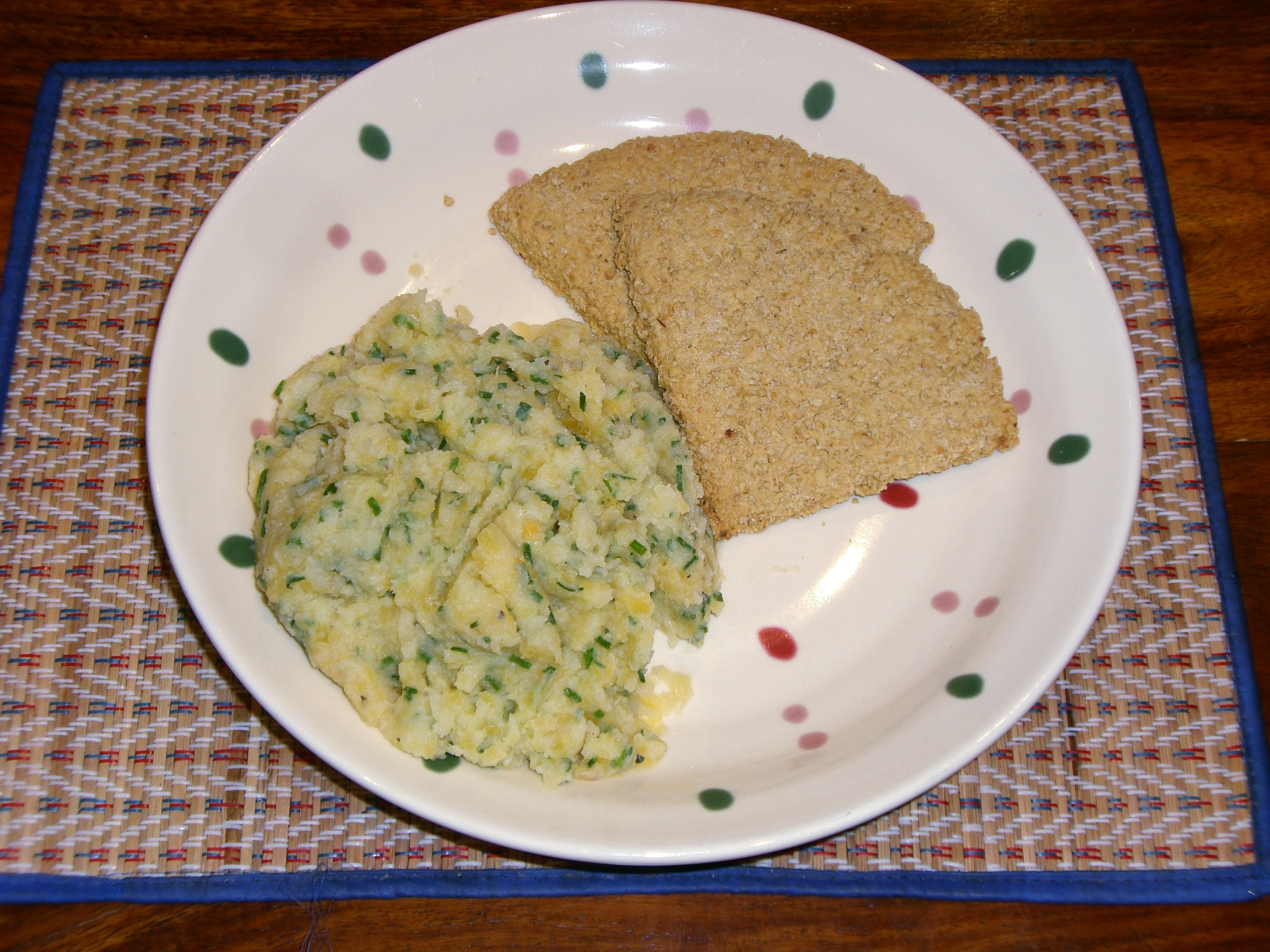
Oatcakes (top) with clapshot

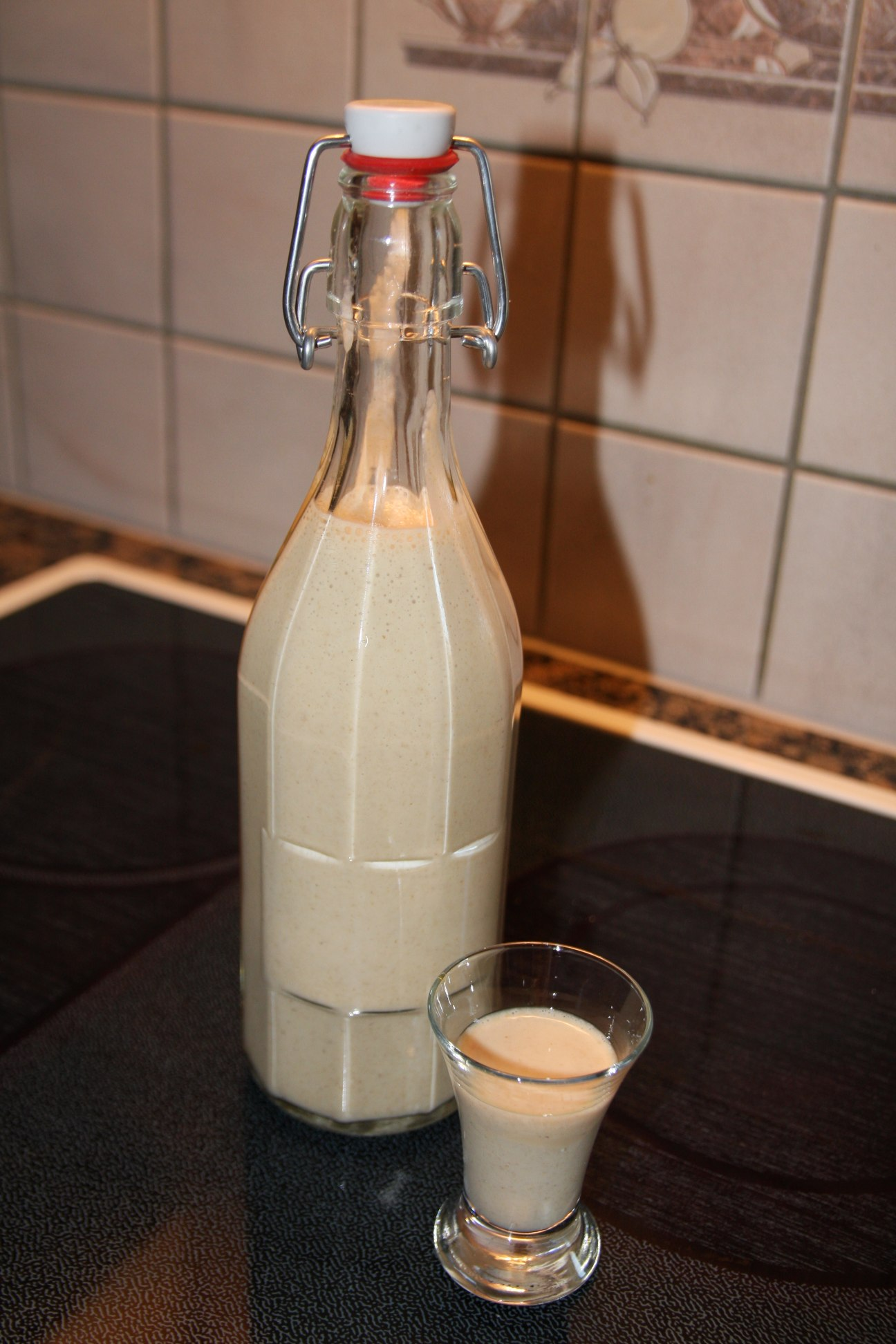
Atholl brose, a Scottish beverage

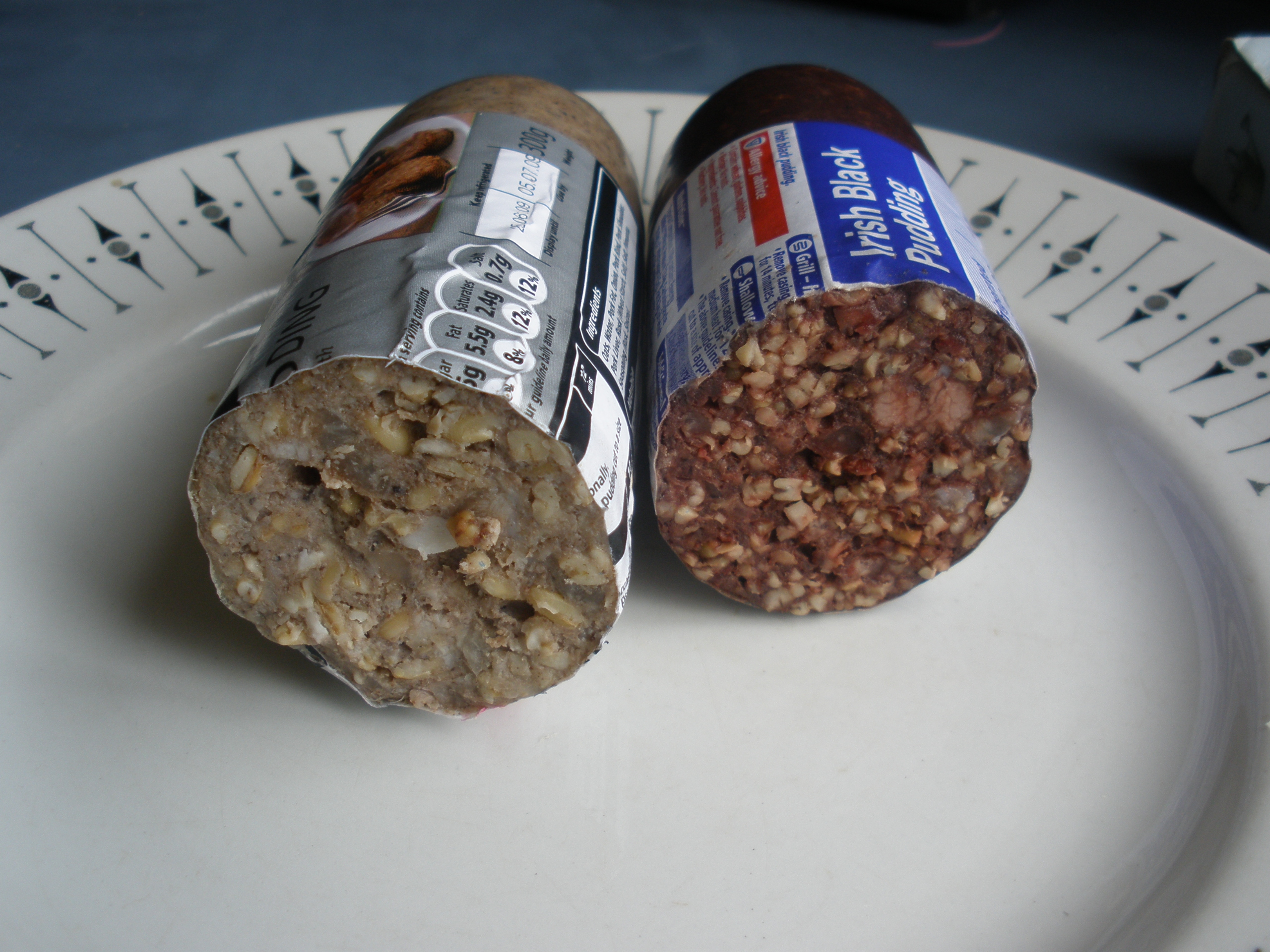
White (left) and black (right) puddings containing oatmeal

== See also ==
- Oatmeal raisin cookie
- Brenntar (oat porridge)
- Congee, a rice porridge eaten in Asian countries
- Finnish bread
- List of porridges
