= Brose =

Type of porridge

- Type: Uncooked form of porridge
- Place of origin: Scotland
- Invented: 16th century
- Serving temperature: With salt and butter, milk or buttermilk
- Main ingredients: Oatmeal
- Ingredients generally used: Boiling water (or stock)
- Variations: Crowdie

Brose is a Scots word for an uncooked form of porridge, whereby oatmeal (and/or other meals) is mixed with boiling water (or stock) and allowed to stand for a short time. It is eaten with salt and butter, milk, or buttermilk. A version of brose made with ground oats and cold water is called crowdie, although that term is more often used for a type of cheese.

Brose is generally denser and more sustaining than porridge, and is best made with medium or coarse oatmeal—not rolled (flattened) "porage oats".

In the 16th century, a mixture of oatmeal and water was carried by shepherds; brose resulted from the agitation of the mixture as they climbed the hills.

In addition to oats, brose can be made with barley meal, peasemeal, or a mixture of different meals. Other ingredients, such as nettle tops, kale, or swede (rutabaga), may be added to the basic brose.

Atholl brose (or Athol Brose, Athole Brose) is a Scottish alcoholic drink of oatmeal brose, honey, whisky and sometimes cream (particularly on festive occasions); also an alternative name for the dessert cranachan which uses similar ingredients.

== See also ==
- Atole
- Posset
- Tsampa
