= O that I had ne'er been Married =

1795 song by Robert Burns

Song
- Published: 1795
- Songwriter: Robert Burns

"O that I had ne'er been Married" is a Scots-language poem and song by Robert Burns. It dates from 1795. It was included in the Scots Musical Museum collection.

Burns may have written it himself as there is no record of the song prior to the Scots Musical Museum, and it was claimed by William Stenhouse, the editor, that Burns related the melody of the song to the Museums publisher James Johnson. It is considered more probable that Johnson found the song after Burns's death. The complete poetical works of Robert Burns from 1871 describes the song as "very ancient" and Burn's two stanzas as "very pathetic", complimenting the "beautifully plaintive" air. Burns quoted part of the song in a 1793 letter to a Mrs. Dunlop that remarked on his own domestic travails.

It is noted in the Scots Musical Museum that the song was "corrected" by Burns, though his specific changes are not indicated. Johnson notes that Burns added the last verse of the song, it was common practice for Burns to use extant pieces for his own inspiration.

It was arranged by Benjamin Britten in 1922 and included in his 1985 collection Beware! Three Early Songs.

== Lyrics ==
O that I had ne'er been married,
I wad never had nae care,
Now I've gotten wife an' weans,
An' they cry "Crowdie" evermair.

Ance crowdie, twice crowdie,
Three times crowdie in a day
Gin ye crowdie ony mair,
Ye'll crowdie a' my meal away.

Waefu' Want and Hunger fley me,
Glowrin' by the hallan en';
Sair I fecht them at the door,
But aye I'm eerie they come ben.
Ance crowdie, &c.
