= Posset =

Hot drink with wine and milk

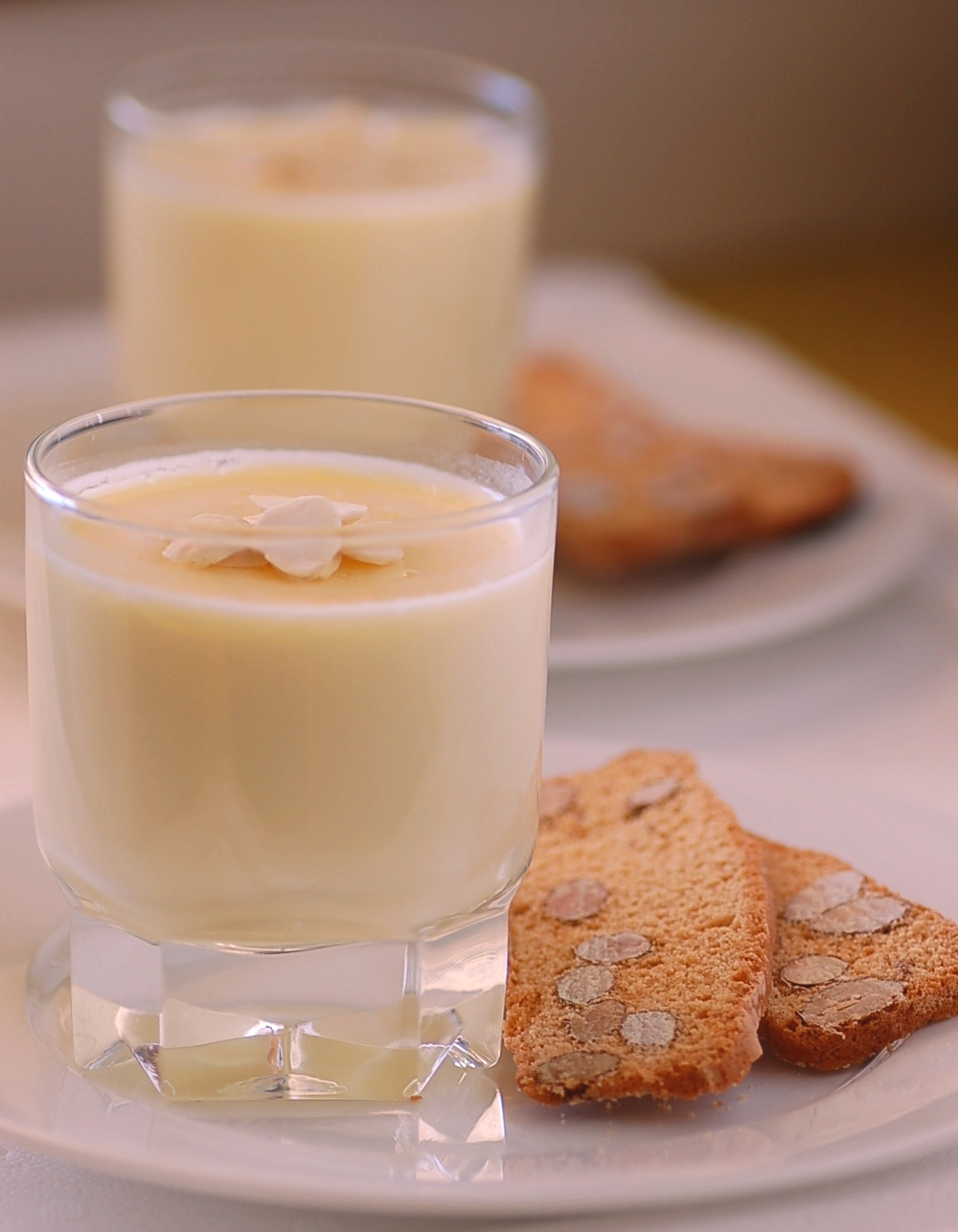
A glass of the modern lemon posset dessert, served with almond bread

A posset (/ˈpɒsət/, historically also spelled possyt, possot or poshote), was originally a popular hot drink made of milk curdled with wine or ale, often spiced, which was often used as a remedy. In the 18th century, it was reportedly only drunk in Sweden, Norway and England. The original drink became extinct and the name was revived in the 19th century and applied to a cream, sugar and citrus-based confection, which is consumed today as a cold set dessert nearly indistinguishable from syllabub.

== Introduction ==
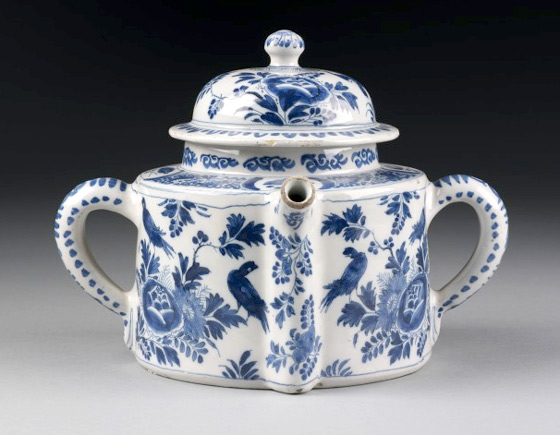
Posset pot, Netherlands, Late 17th or early 18th century, Tin-glazed earthenware painted in blue V&A Museum no. 3841-1901 Victoria and Albert Museum, London

To make the drink, milk was heated to a boil, then mixed with wine or ale, which curdled it, and spiced with nutmeg and cinnamon.

It was considered a specific remedy for some minor illnesses, such as a cold, and a general remedy for others, as even today people drink hot milk to help them sleep.

== History ==
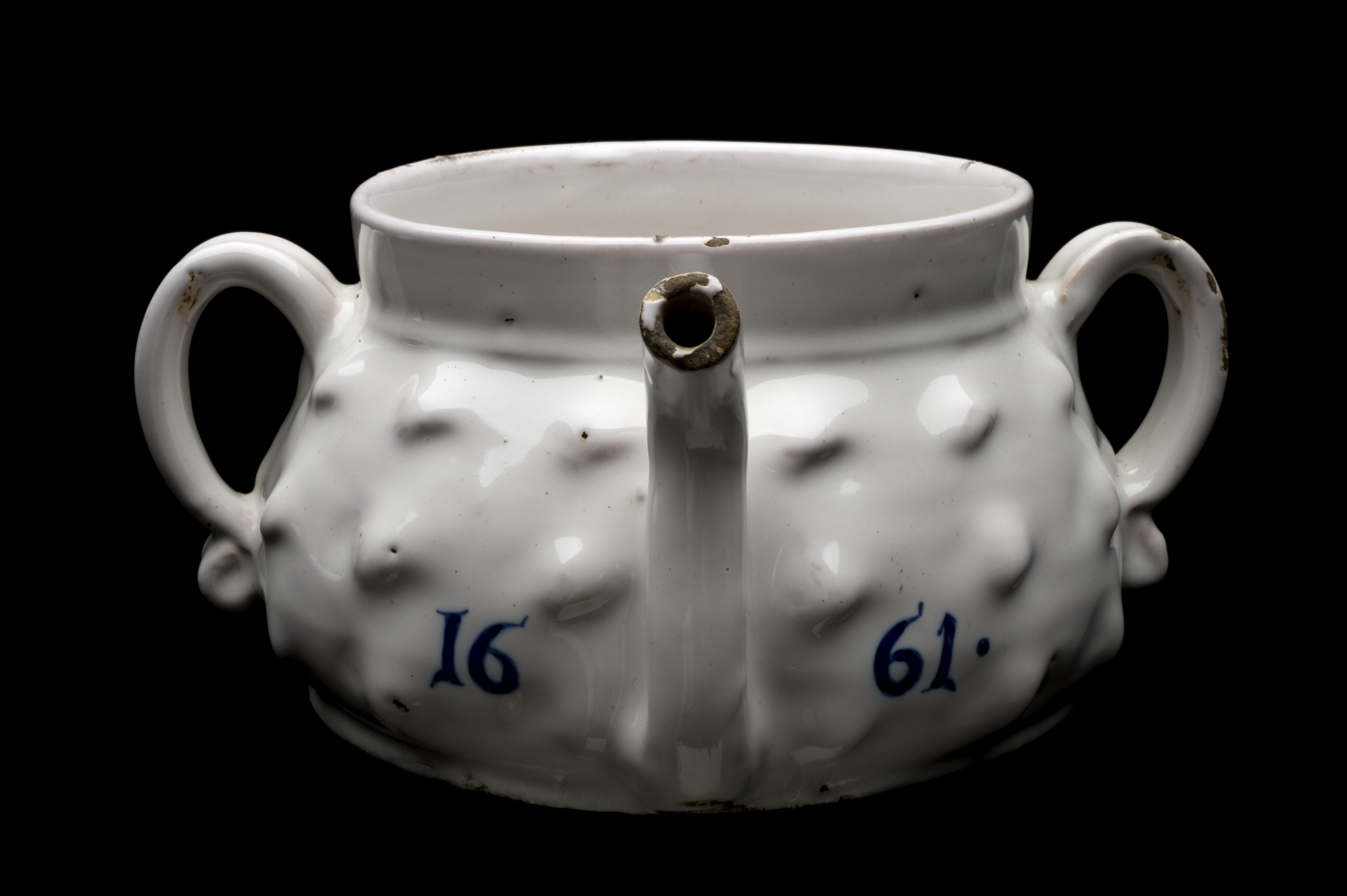
A 1661 posset pot from England.

The OED traces the word to the 15th century: various Latin vocabularies translate balducta, bedulta, or casius as "poshet", "poshoote", "possyt", or "possot". Russell's Boke of Nurture (c. 1460) lists various dishes and ingredients that "close a mannes stomak", including "þe possate".

Posset is frequently used as a starting point for other recipes (e.g. "Make a styf Poshote of Milke an Ale", and "Take cowe Mylke, & set it ouer þe fyre, & þrow þer-on Saunderys, & make a styf poshotte of Ale", each of which is the first sentence of a longer recipe). Recipes for it appear in other 15th-century sources: boil milk, add either wine or ale "and no salt", let it cool, gather the curds and discard the whey, and season with ginger, sugar, and possibly "sweet wine" and candied anise. Certain monks would make a posset including eggs and figs, a possible precursor to eggnog.

In 14th and 15th century cookery manuals, a possibly-related word, spelled variously "possenet", "postnet", or "posnet", is used to mean a small pot or saucepan. In 16th-century and later sources, possets are generally made from lemon or other citrus juice, cream and sugar. Eggs are often added. Some recipes used breadcrumbs to thicken the beverage.

"Posset sets" for mixing and serving possets were popular gifts, and valuable ones (often made of silver) were heirlooms. Such sets contained a posset "pot", or "bowl", or "cup" to serve it in, a container for mixing it in, and usually various containers for the ingredients, as well as spoons. The posset set that the Spanish ambassador gave Queen Mary I of England and King Philip II of Spain when they became betrothed in 1554 is believed to have been made by Benvenuto Cellini and is of crystal, gold, precious gems, and enamel. It is on display at Hatfield House in England and consists of a large, stemmed, covered bowl; two open, stemmed vessels; a covered container; three spoons; and two forks.

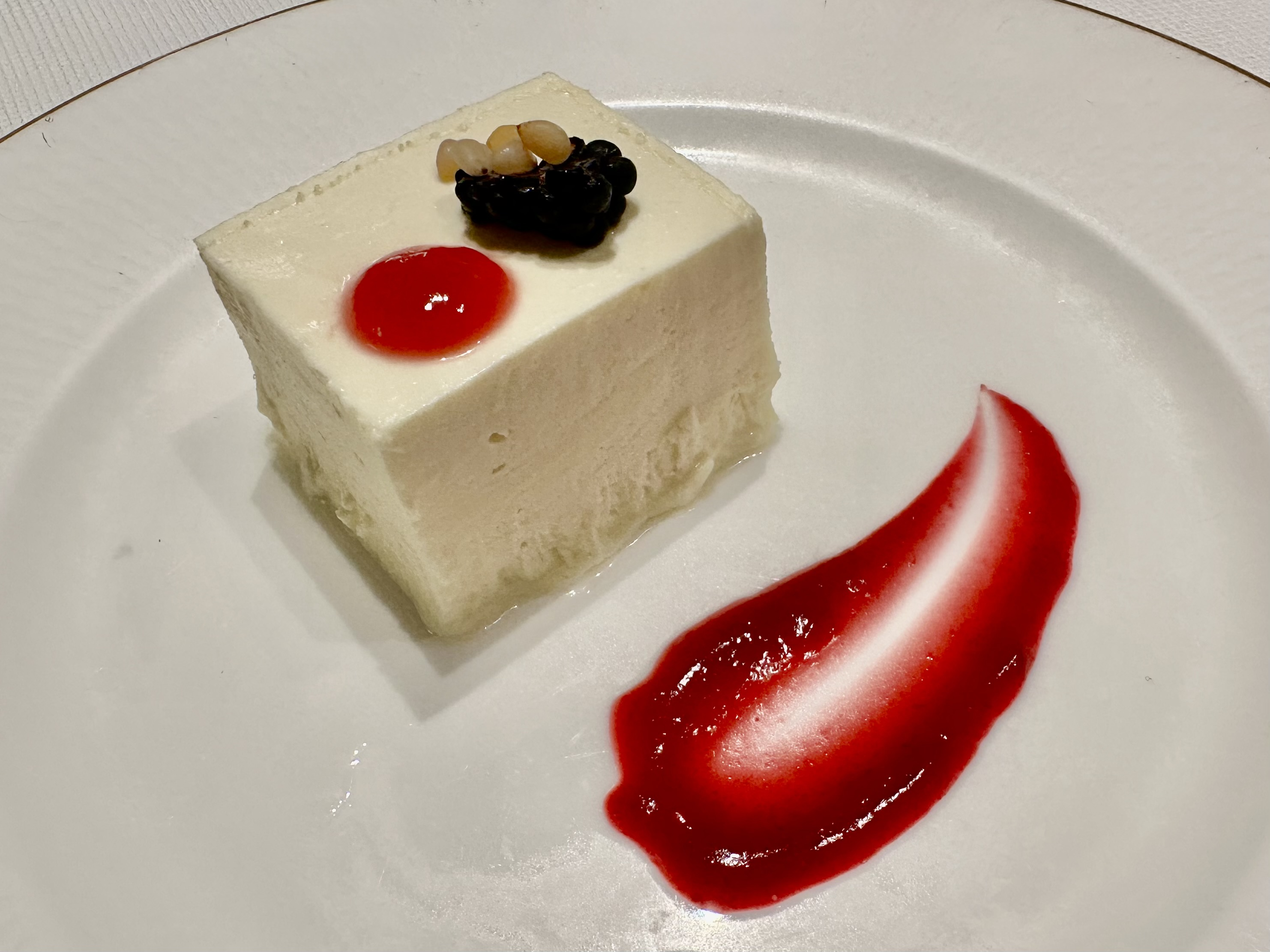
Lemon posset

The word "posset" is mostly used nowadays for a cold set dessert invented in the late 19th c., containing cream and lemon, similar to syllabub. It is also used to refer to the semi-digested milk brought up by babies after a feed.

== See also ==
- Brose / Atholl brose
- Caudle
- Eggnog
- Hot toddy
- List of hot beverages
