= Syllabub =

Acid-curdled milk or cream used as a drink or dessert topping

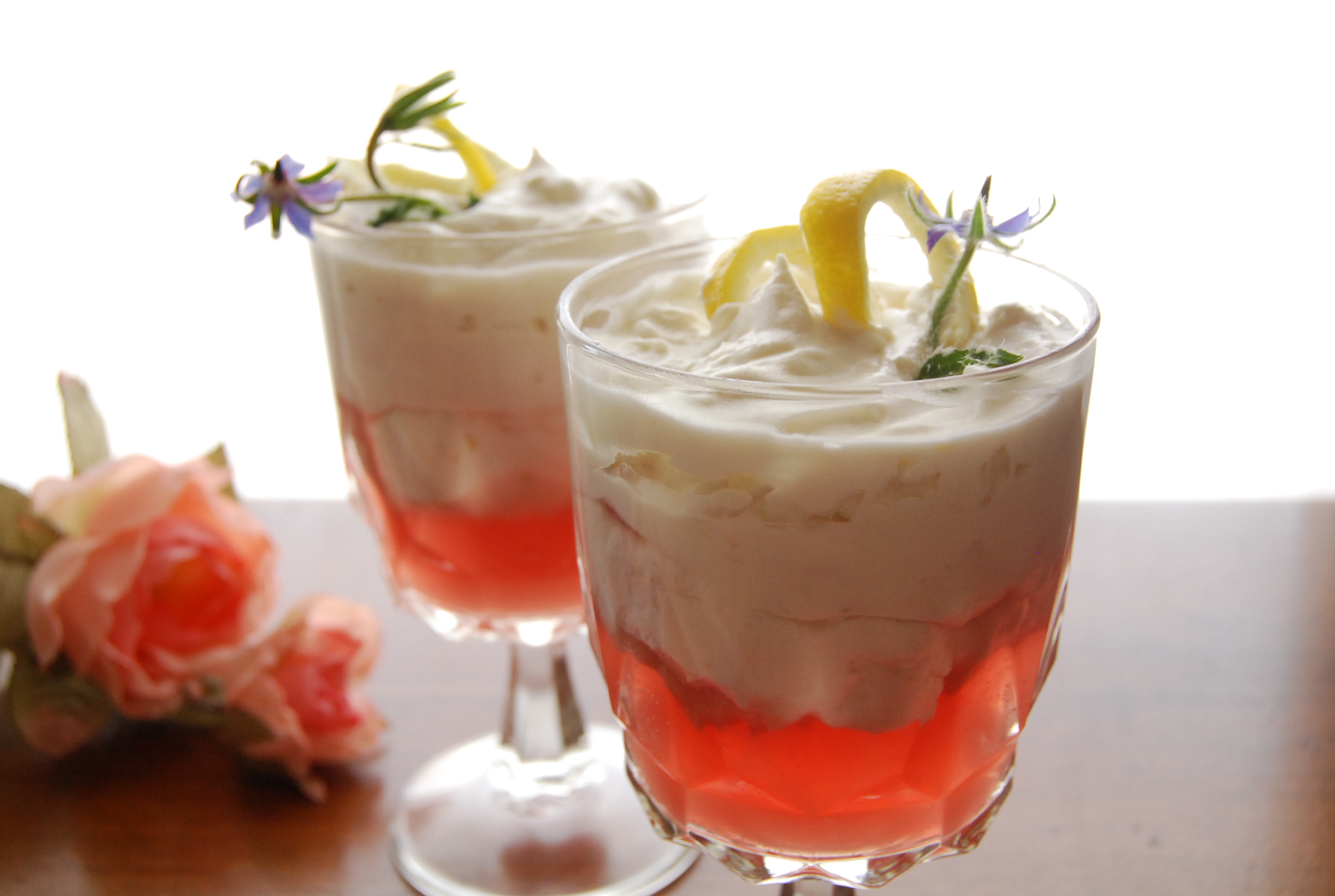
- Type: Pudding or beverage
- Course: Dessert or dessert topping
- Place of origin: Britain
- Main ingredients: Milk or cream, sugar, wine

An 18th-century syllabub glass

Syllabub refers to both a pudding and a beverage, both made by curdling cream or milk with an acid such as wine or cider. Both dishes were popular in British cuisine from the 16th to the 19th centuries. The holiday punch, sweet and frothy, was often considered a ladies' drink.

Early recipes for syllabub are for a drink of cider with milk. By the 17th century it had evolved into a type of dessert made with sweet white wine. More wine could be added to make a punch, but it could also be made to have a thicker consistency that could be eaten with a spoon, used as a topping for trifle, or to dip fingers of sponge cake into.

== History ==
Syllabub (or solybubbe, sullabub, sullibib, sullybub, sullibub; there is no certain etymology and considerable variation in spelling) has been known in England at least since Nicholas Udall's Thersytes of 1537: "You and I... Muste walke to him and eate a solybubbe." The word occurs repeatedly, including in Samuel Pepys's diary for 12 July 1663; "Then to Comissioner Petts and had a good Sullybub" and in Thomas Hughes's Tom Brown at Oxford of 1861; "We retire to tea or syllabub beneath the shade of some great oak."

Hannah Glasse, in the 18th century, published the recipe for whipt syllabubs in The Art of Cookery Made Plain and Easy. The recipe's ingredients were:

a quart of thick cream, and half a pint of sack, the juice of two Seville oranges or lemons, grate in the peel of two lemons, half a pound of double refined sugar.

These were whipped together and poured into glasses. The curdled cream separated and floated to the top. The milk and cream used in those days would have been thicker and modern recipes require adjustments to achieve the desired effect.

== See also ==
- Cranachan, a similar dessert from Scotland
- Eton mess, a similar dessert using strawberries and meringue
- Posset
