= Cranachan =

Traditional Scottish dessert

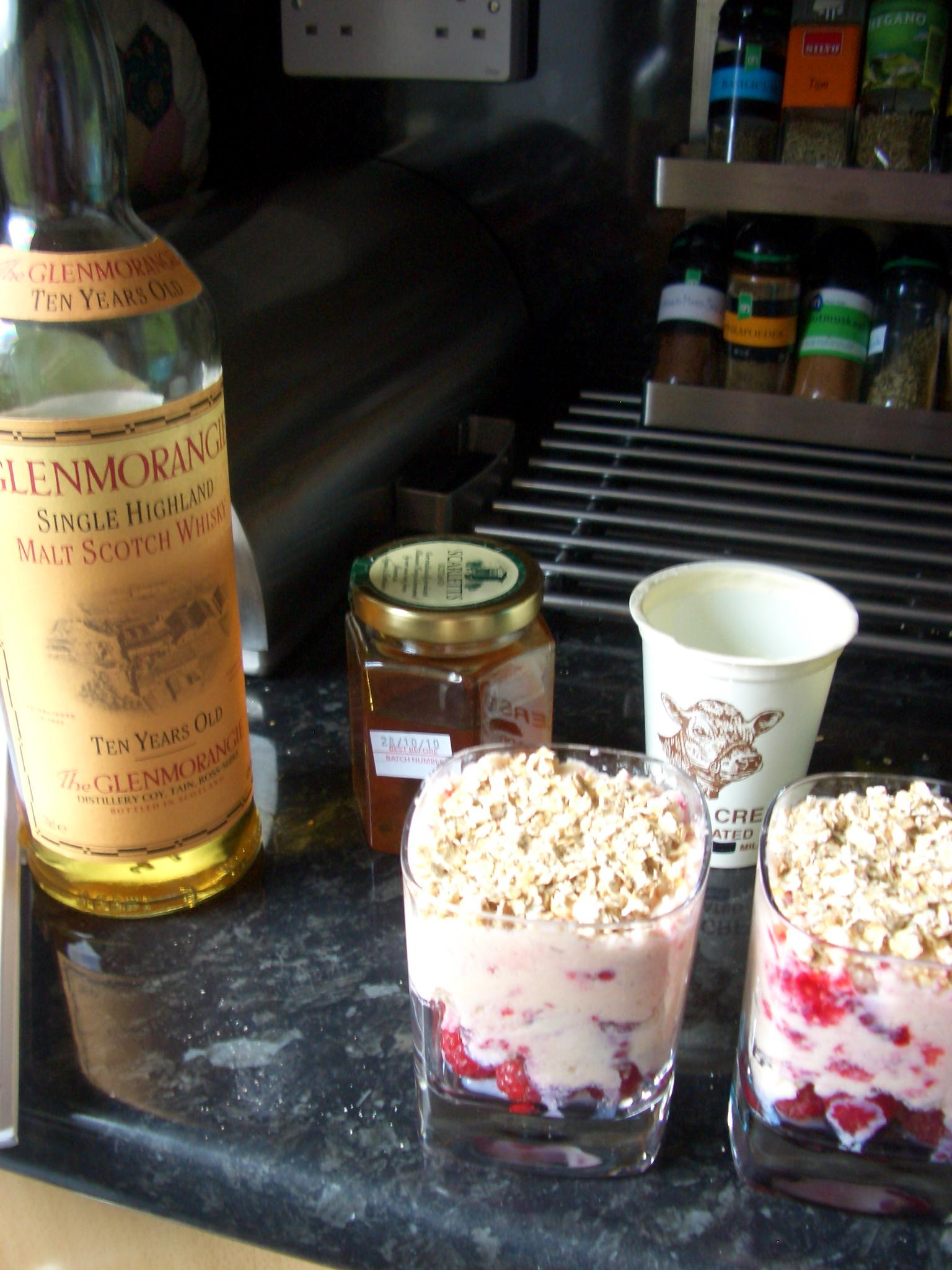
- Alternative names: Crannachan
- Course: Dessert
- Place of origin: Scotland
- Main ingredients: Whipped cream, whisky, honey (preferably heather honey), raspberries, oatmeal

Cranachan (Scottish Gaelic: Crannachan pronounced [ˈkʰɾan̪ˠəxan]) is a traditional Scottish dessert. It was originally a celebration of harvest, made following the raspberry harvest in August. The dessert of cream and fresh seasonal raspberries is bolstered by Scottish oats and whisky. It has been called "the uncontested king of Scottish desserts". Cranachan owes its origins to crowdie, a popular breakfast in which crowdie cheese is combined with lightly toasted oatmeal, cream, and local honey. Raspberries, when in season, might be added to the dish.

Cranachan is now served all year round, and typically on special occasions. A traditional way to serve cranachan is to bring dishes of each ingredient to the table so that each person can assemble their own dessert to taste.

== Recipes ==
There are many versions of this traditional Scottish pudding. Earlier recipes used crowdie cheese instead of, or in addition to, cream and were sometimes called cream-crowdie. Other earlier recipes are more austere, omitting the whisky and treating the fruit as an optional extra. More modern recipes have swapped the crowdie cheese for a simple whipped cream. Modern recipes usually are made from a mixture of double cream, whisky, honey and fresh raspberries, with toasted oatmeal soaked overnight in a little drop of whisky. Tall dessert glasses are often used to serve.

Alternative versions of the recipe include orange cranachan, cranachan trifle, spiced rum, and shortbread round. For spiced rum cranachan the rum mixture is folded in with whipped cream and placed on top of the shortbread and then the raspberries are added. Whisky-soaked raisins can be used if raspberries are unavailable. Chocolate cranachan can be made with chopped toasted hazelnuts, light muscovado sugar and chocolate.

== See also ==
- Eton mess, a similar dessert using strawberries and meringue
- Syllabub, a similar dessert
