= Meal Monday =

Scottish traditional holiday

- Observed by: Ancient Scottish Universities
- Type: Academic
- Date: Second Monday in February
- 2025 date: February 10
- 2026 date: February 9
- 2027 date: February 8
- 2028 date: February 14
- Frequency: annual

Meal Monday (also known as Oatmeal Monday) was a traditional holiday observed by the ancient universities of Scotland on the second Monday of February.

During the 17th century, Scottish university students lived in very basic accommodation and were required to bring their own fuel, firewood or peat, to maintain a fire. Their diet was meagre too, largely consisting of oatmeal, which they would make into porridge. This lifestyle would remain typical until the late 19th century. The Rev. James Sharp noted that as a student at the University of Edinburgh, "the liberal arts, sciences and theology were cultivated on oatmeal, with an occasional glass of beer on a Saturday night."

As the students' country homes or farms were some distance from the city universities, an occasional long weekend was scheduled to permit them to replenish their supplies. Originally, and until as recently as 1885, these Meal Mondays would occur regularly; the University of Edinburgh had one on the first Monday of every month. However, by 1896 Edinburgh established just one official holiday, on the second Monday in February.

Meal Monday remained widely observed in Scotland during the late 19th and 20th century, with Glasgow and Aberdeen Universities also having the academic holiday. In 2006, Scottish author Alexander McCall Smith reported that "[it] was still celebrated some 30 years ago, when I was a student, although nobody used it to fetch oatmeal." By the beginning of the 21st century, however, the Universities no longer afforded their students an official Meal Monday holiday, though the University of St. Andrews still maintains Meal Monday as a statutory holiday for "manual staff."
