= Fruit fool =

English dessert of fruit and custard or cream

Fool
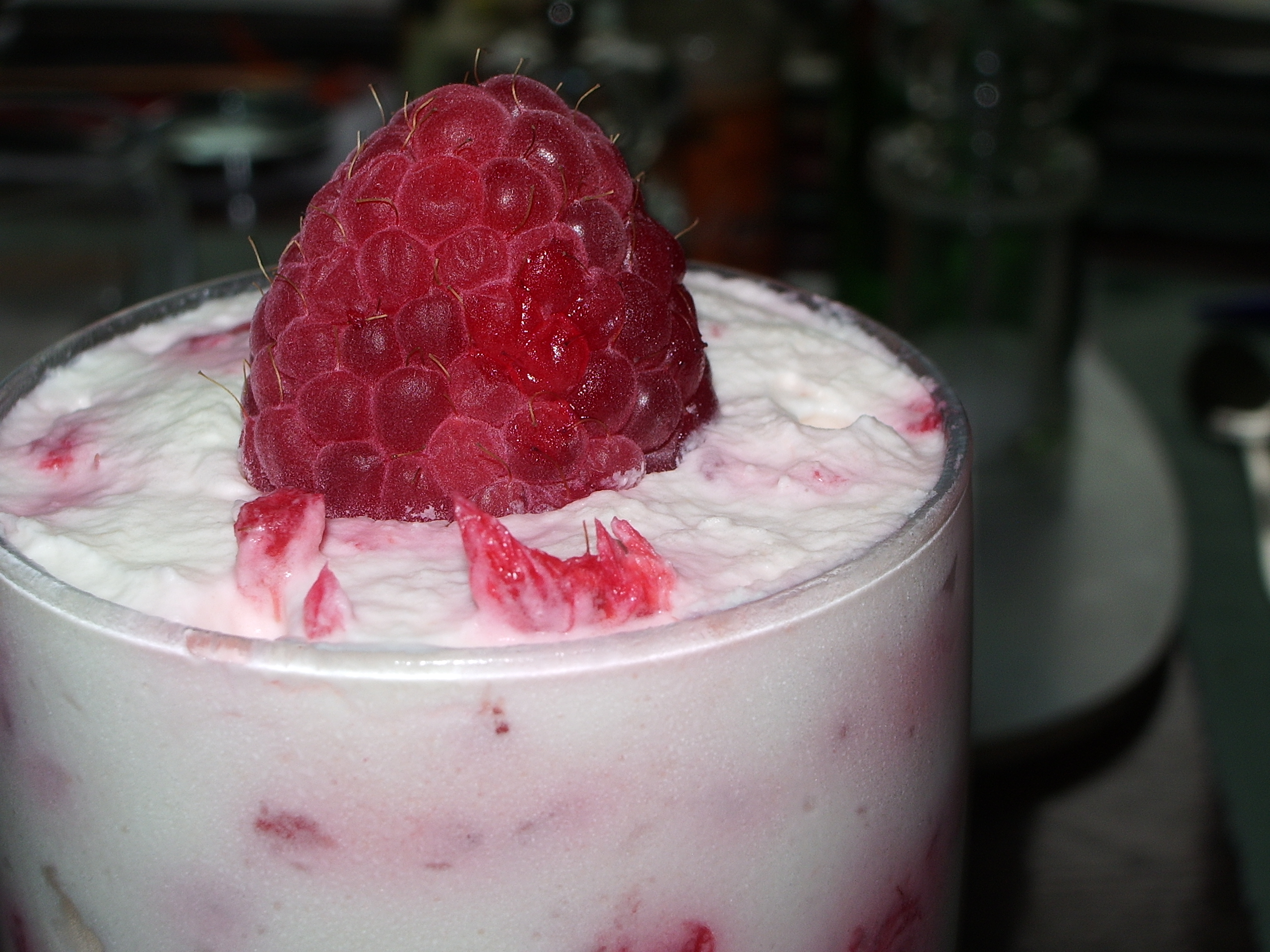
- A raspberry fool
- Alternative names: Foole
- Course: Dessert
- Place of origin: England
- Main ingredients: Puréed fruit, whipped cream, sugar
- Variations: Trifle

A fool is an English dessert. Traditionally, fruit fool is made by folding puréed stewed fruit (classically gooseberries) into sweet custard. Modern fool recipes often use whipped cream instead of custard. Additionally, a flavouring such as rose water may be added.

== Etymology ==
The reason the word "fool" is used for this fruit dessert is unclear. Several authors believe it derives from the French verb fouler meaning "to crush" or "to press" (in the context of pressing grapes for wine). Food writer Alan Davidson argues that it is 'reasonable to suppose that the idea of mashed fruit was there from the start' but also points out that Norfolk fool, a type of bread pudding, contained no fruit. This derivation is dismissed by the Oxford English Dictionary as baseless and inconsistent with the early use of the word. The name trifle was also originally applied to the dish, with the two names being used, for a time, interchangeably. In the late 16th century, a trifle was 'a dish composed of cream boiled with various ingredients'. Davidson suggests that this is 'also the description one could give of a fool'. In support for this theory, Davidson quotes John Florio from his dictionary of 1598: 'a kinde of clouted cream called a fool or a trifle'.

== History ==
'Foole' is first mentioned as a dessert in 1598, a 'kinde of clouted cream called a fool or a trifle', although gooseberry fool may date back to the 15th century. One early recipe for gooseberry fool dates to the mid-17th century. The soft fruits used in fools in the sixteenth and seventeenth centuries were often boiled and pulped before being mixed with the cream. It was considered the most 'prudent' way to eat fruit at the time as there was a fear that raw fruit was unhealthy. Fruit fools and creams, argues food historian C. Anne Wilson, 'succeeded the medieval fruit pottages. They were based on the pulp of cooked fruits beaten together with cream and sugar. Gooseberries, and later orange juice combined with beaten eggs, were made up into fools.' The cream in earlier fools was often unwhipped. The process of whipping cream before forks were adopted in the late 17th century was long and difficult. The eggs used in many earlier fool recipes became less common, and now most fools are made without them.

== Variations ==
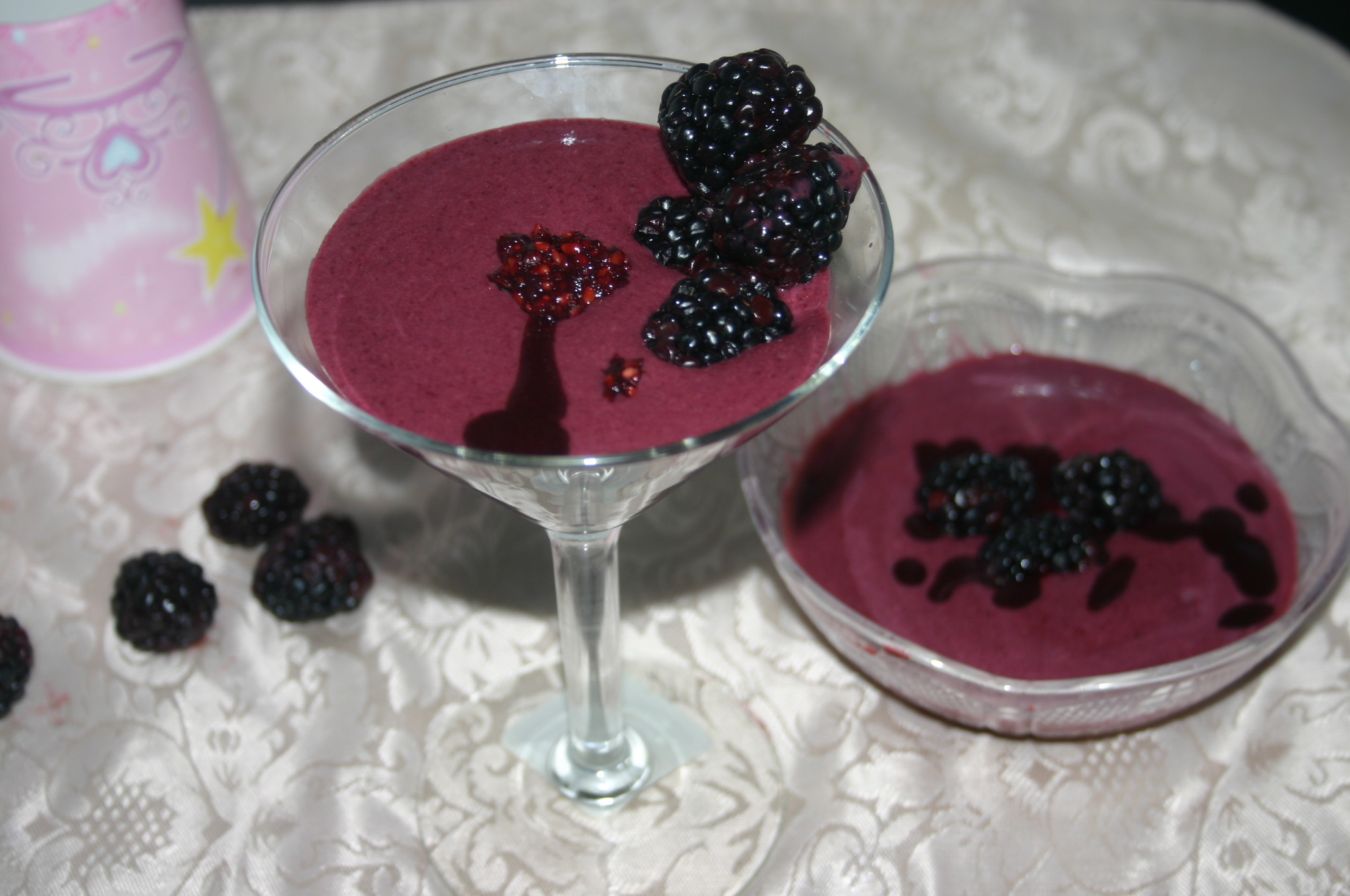
Blackberry fool

Originally, the most common fruit ingredient in fools was gooseberries, although other fruits and berries are known from early recipes, e.g., apples, strawberries, rhubarb and raspberries. Modern recipes may include any seasonal fruit readily found. In Anglo-Indian cuisine, mango fool is a popular variation.

Norfolk fool is an old local variation of the fruit fool, often containing minimal or no fruit. It is seasoned with spices, such as mace and cinnamon, and thickened with eggs and boiled.

An early recipe can be found in The Accomplisht Cook by Robert May:

To make a Norfolk Fool. Take a quart of good thick sweet cream, and set it a boiling in a clean scoured skillet, with some large mace and whole cinnamon; then having boil'd a warm or two take the yolks of five or six eggs dissolved and put to it, being taken from the fire, then take out the cinnamon and mace; the cream being pretty thick, slice a fine manchet into thin slices, as much as will cover the bottom of the dish, pour on the cream on them, and more bread, some two or three times till the dish be full, then trim the dish side with fine carved sippets, and stick it with slic't dates, scrape on sugar, and cast on red and white biskets.

== See also ==
- Compote
- Crème brûlée
- Eton mess
- Trifle
- List of desserts
- List of fruit dishes
- Panna cotta
- Pavlova (dessert)
- Smoothie
