= Beware! Three Early Songs =

Song cycle by Benjamin Britten

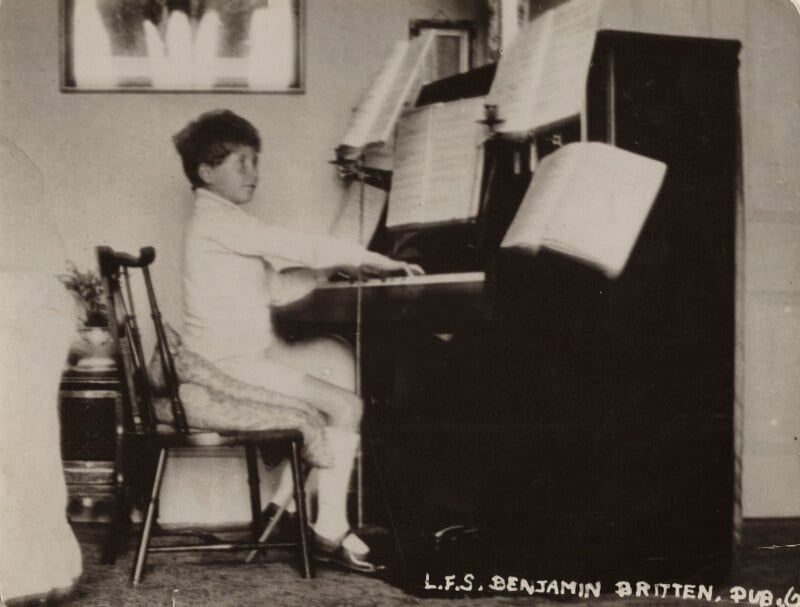
Benjamin Britten in 1921

Beware! Three Early Songs is a song cycle for voice and piano composed by Benjamin Britten and set to texts by Herbert Asquith, Robert Burns and Henry Wadsworth Longfellow.

"Beware!" and "O that I had ne'er been Married" were composed in 1922, and are considered examples of Britten's juvenilia, as they were composed at the age of 10. "Epitaph: The Clerk", is a setting of the first verse of the poem "The Volunteer" by Herbert Asquith. It was composed in 1926. The pieces were revised in 1968 and published in 1985. Britten mistakenly believed that "Epitaph: The Clerk" was written by Walter de la Mare when he was revising Tit for Tat, his setting of five pieces by De La Mare, in 1968. The pieces were compiled into this collection by Britten when he was reviving Tit for Tat and Five Walztes (sic), two early compositions from 1926. Rudyard Kipling's "Fuzzy Wuzzy", composed between 1922 and 1923, was revised at the same time, but remains unpublished.

Britten's biographer, David Matthews, wrote of "Beware" and "O that I had ne'er been Married" that it was "a little disconcerting to find the texts of both of these songs are warnings against women". Graham Johnson wrote that of Beware that for an 8 or 9-year-old "to write music that is this direct, this aware of the vocal line and potential of the human voice is almost a Mozartian feat".

"O that I had ne'er been Married" was performed by Peter Pears with accompaniment from pianist Roger Vignoles on a Thames Television broadcast from the Britten Pears Foundation on 29 November 1976, though pre-recorded on 20 May that year.

== Songs ==
The songs are:

1. "Beware"
2. "O that I had ne'er been Married"
3. "Epitaph: The Clerk"

A complete performance takes about 3 minutes.
