= Caboc =

Scottish cheese

Caboc is a Scottish cream cheese, made with double cream or cream-enriched milk. This rennet-free cheese is formed into a log shape and rolled in toasted pinhead oatmeal, to be served with oatcakes or dry toast.

== Description ==
The texture is smooth, slightly thicker and grainier than clotted cream, while the colour is a pale primrose yellow. The fat content is typically 67-69%, which is comparable with rich continental cream cheeses such as mascarpone. Historically, it was a cheese for the wealthy, unlike the similarly aged Crowdie, which is made from the by-products of skimming cream from milk and thus is considered a poor man's cheese.
