= Trifle =

Layered fruit dessert

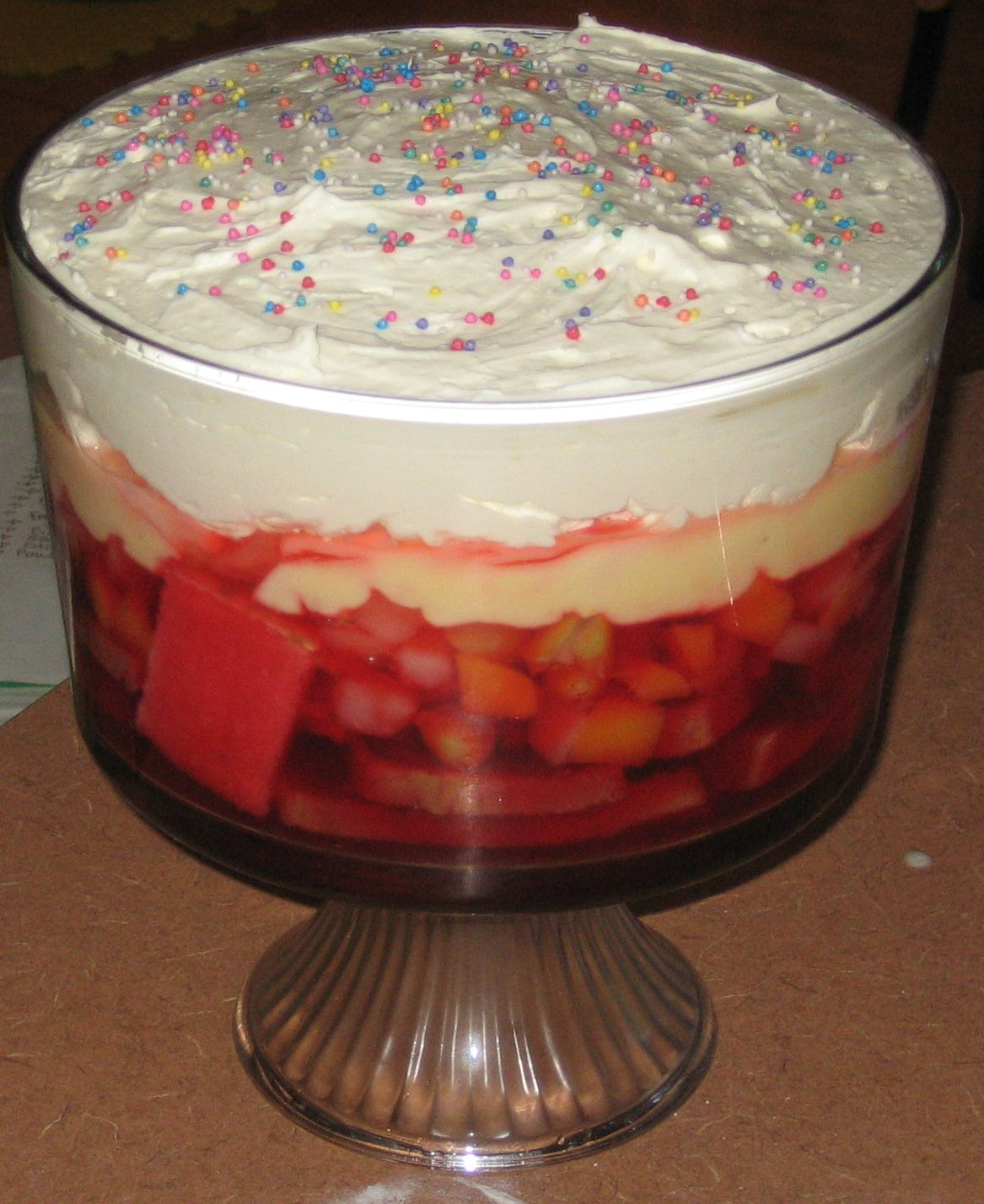
- The layers of a trifle dessert
- Course: Dessert
- Place of origin: England
- Main ingredients: Variable: sponge biscuit (ladyfinger), sherry, custard, fruit, whipped cream

Trifle is an English dessert consisting of ladyfingers or sponge cake, fruit (fresh or jelly), custard and whipped cream layered in a glass dish. The ingredients are variable. The fruit and sponge layers may be suspended in fruit-flavoured jelly arranged in three or four layers. The assembled dessert can be topped with whipped cream or, more traditionally, syllabub.

The name trifle was used for a dessert like a fruit fool in the 16th century; by the 18th century, Hannah Glasse records a recognisably modern trifle, with the inclusion of a gelatin jelly.

== History ==
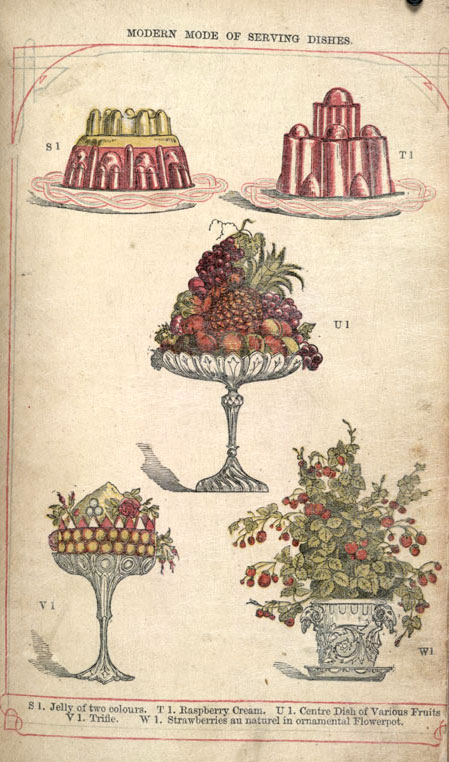
Illustrations from Isabella Beeton's Book of Household Management, 1861

Trifle appeared in cookery books in the sixteenth century. The earliest use of the name trifle was in a recipe for a thick cream flavoured with sugar, ginger and rosewater, in Thomas Dawson's 1585 book of English cookery The Good Huswifes Jewell. This flavoured thick cream was cooked 'gently like a custard, and was grand enough to be presented in a silver bowl. These earlier trifles, it is claimed, 'derived from the flavoured almond milk of medieval times'. Early trifles were, according to food historian Annie Gray, 'more like fools (puréed fruit mixed with sweetened cream)'. Trifle evolved from these fools, and originally the two names were used interchangeably.

It was not until the 1750s that trifles took the form that many know of today. Two recipes for what now is considered a trifle first appeared in the mid-18th century in England. Both recipes described biscuits soaked in wine layered with custard and covered in a whipped syllabub froth. One was in the 4th edition of Hannah Glasse's The Art of Cookery Made Plain and Easy (1751) and the other was by an unknown author entitled The Whole Duty of a Woman (1751).

Jelly is first recorded as part of a trifle recipe in Hannah Glasse's 'A grand trifle' in her book The Compleat Confectioner (1760). Her recipe instructs the reader to use calves' feet to make a rich calves-foot jelly, and to half fill the dish with this jelly. Biscuits and macaroons are broken into pieces and stuck into the jelly before it sets, 'thick sweet cream' is poured over the jelly and biscuits and the whole is decorated with pieces of calves-foot jelly, raspberry jam and currant jelly cut into pieces, and more macaroons finish the dish.

The Dean's Cream from Cambridge, England was made about the same time as Hannah Glasse's version and was composed of sponge cakes, spread with jam, macaroons and ratafias soaked in sherry, and covered with syllabub. Trifle-like desserts of the eighteenth and early nineteenth centuries include King's Pudding, Easter Pudding, Victoria Pudding or Colchester pudding.

In 1855 Eliza Acton described The Duke's Custard, a mixture of sugared, brandied Morella cherries, covered in custard, edged with Naples biscuits (sponge fingers) or macaroons, which was then finished with solid whipped cream coloured pink with cochineal and 'highly flavoured' with brandy.

The English cookery writer Jane Grigson has a trifle in her book on English Food (first published in 1974) and she describes her version, which includes macaroons, Frontignan wine, brandy, eggs, raspberry jam and everlasting syllabub, as "a pudding worth eating, not the mean travesty made with yellow, packaged sponge cakes, poor sherry and powdered custard".

The late 19th century was, according to the food historian Annie Gray, "a sort of heyday" for trifles and by the early 1900s there were, in print, says Gray, "a bewildering number of recipes". There were thirteen in The Encyclopaedia of Practical Cookery: A Complete Dictionary of All Pertaining to the Art of Cookery and Table Service (8 volumes, 1891), from Theodore Francis Garrett, alone. That book is unusual, suggests Gray, in including two savoury versions, one with veal and one with lobster.

In 2022, a trifle was selected to be the Platinum Pudding, to help celebrate the Platinum Jubilee of Queen Elizabeth II. A lemon Swiss roll and amaretti trifle, created by Jemma Melvin from Southport, Merseyside, in the United Kingdom won a competition run by Fortnum & Mason "to create a pudding fit for the Queen".

Coronation Trifle was created by Adam Handling for the Coronation of King Charles III in 2023. It is made with parkin, ginger custard and strawberry jelly.

== Variations ==
Trifles may contain different sorts of alcohol such as port, punsch, raisin wine or curaçao.

Trifle is a popular Christmas dessert in Australia and New Zealand, where it is traditionally made with Swiss or sponge rolls, tinned peaches, jelly (often the Aeroplane brand), vanilla custard and whipped cream. Fresh fruit and berries are also commonly added as a topping.

== Similar desserts ==
The Scots have a similar dish to the trifle, tipsy laird, made with Drambuie or whisky.

In Italy, a dessert similar to and probably based on trifle is known as zuppa inglese, literally "English soup". Tiramisù is prepared similarly to trifle, but it does not include fruit and the original recipe calls for the savoiardi (ladyfingers) to be dipped in coffee rather than spirits.

== See also ==
- Cassata – Type of sponge cake
- Crema de fruta – Filipino layer cake
- Pavê – Brazilian layered cake
- Icebox cake – Dessert
- List of custard desserts
- Parfait – Frozen dessert
- Pudding – Dessert or savory dish
- Zuppa inglese – Italian dessert
- Eton mess – Unlayered similar English dessert
