= Atholl brose =

Scottish alcoholic drink

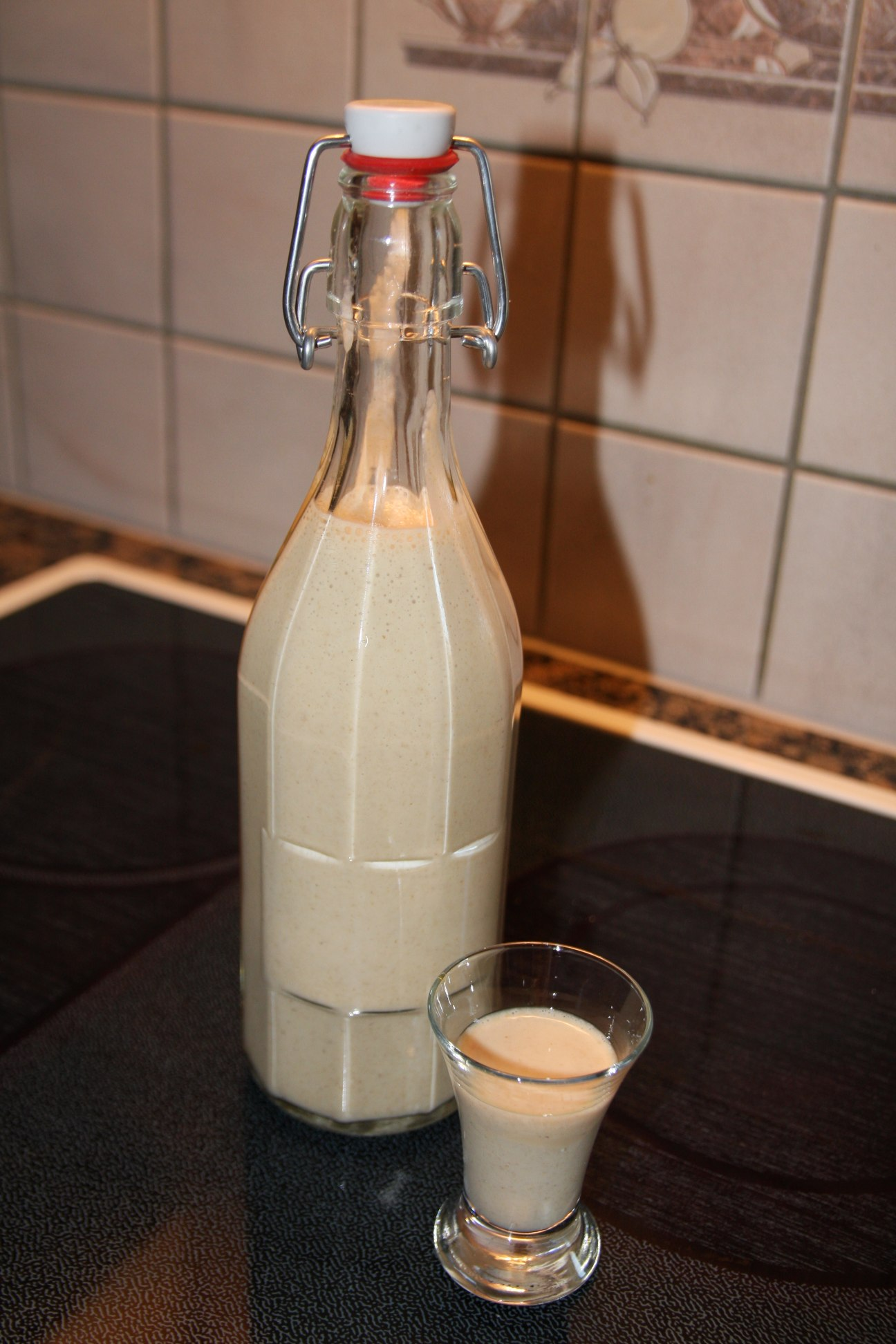
- A glass bottle and shot of Atholl brose
- Type: Cocktail
- Origin: Scotland
- Colour: Cream to beige
- Ingredients: Brose, honey, whisky, cream
- Related products: Cranachan

Atholl brose (or Athol brose, Athole brose) is a Scottish drink obtained by mixing oatmeal brose, honey, whisky, and sometimes cream (particularly on festive occasions). Atholl brose has also become an alternative name for the dessert cranachan, which uses similar ingredients.

According to legend the drink is named after the 1st Earl of Atholl (of the 8th creation), who suppressed a Highland rebellion by The Lord of the Isles against James III of Scotland in 1475. According to legend, he spiked the rebel leader's well with Atholl brose, leading to an inebriated enemy and the rebel leader's capture.

== See also ==
- Scottish cuisine
