= Grain flaker =

Tool for making rolled oats

Grain flaker attachment for a stand mixer

A grain flaker (also oat roller or flaking mill) is a tool for flattening whole-seed cereal grains. When this is done with oats, the seed form, called groats, becomes a foodstuff called rolled oats. Whole grains store longer but cereals are usually cooked before consumption by humans; the rolling process significantly decreases cooking time. Spelt and wheat can also be rolled. Grains other than oats may need to be softened before they can be rolled. Oat rollers work by flattening the grain against a rolling cylinder. It is possible to build a home-scale manually cranked flaking mill. Oats can also be flaked using a rolling pin or a pasta press.

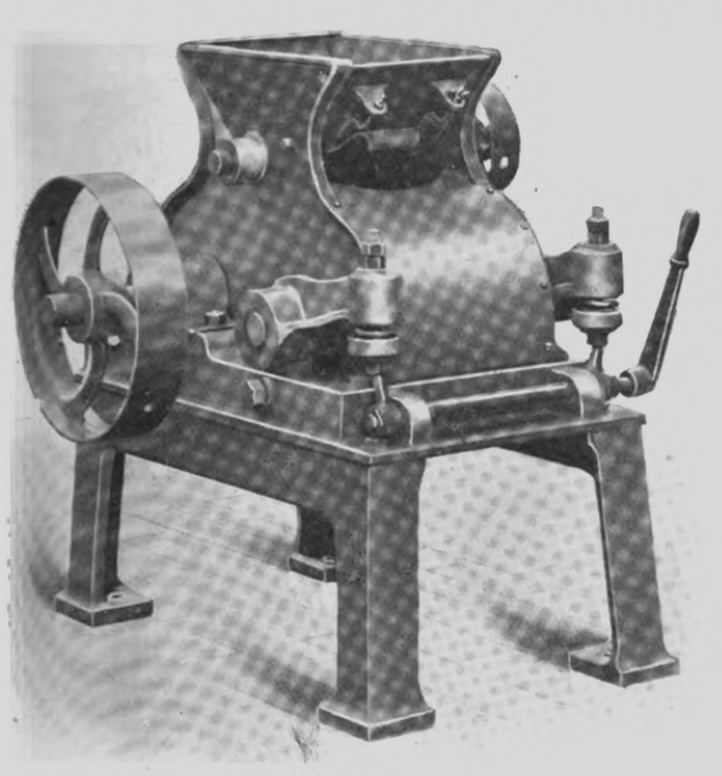
Industrial-scale oat roller manufactured in London, 1906

Using a grain flaker to produce rolled oats for horse feed may decrease horse indigestion compared to feed composed solely of groats.
