= Eton mess =

Traditional English dessert

- A plate of Eton mess
- Alternative names: Harrow Mess
- Course: Dessert
- Place of origin: England
- Region or state: Berkshire
- Created by: Eton College
- Main ingredients: Berries, meringue, cream

Eton mess is a traditional English dessert consisting of a mixture of strawberries or other berries, meringue, and whipped cream. First mentioned in print in 1893, it is commonly believed to originate from Eton College and is served at the annual cricket match against the pupils of Harrow School. Eton mess is occasionally served at Harrow School, where it is called Harrow mess.

Eton mess was served in the 1930s in the school's "sock shop" (tuck shop), and was originally made with either strawberries or bananas mixed with ice-cream or cream. Meringue was a later addition. An Eton mess can be made with many other types of summer fruit, but strawberries are regarded as more traditional.

The word mess may refer to the appearance of the dish, or may be used in the sense of "a quantity of food", particularly "a prepared dish of soft food" or "a mixture of ingredients cooked or eaten together".

== See also ==
- Cranachan
- Fruit fool
- Pavlova
- Trifle
