= Crowdie =

Fresh cheese, traditionally from Scotland

- Country of origin: Scotland
- Source of milk: cow's milk

Crowdie (Scottish Gaelic: gruth, pronounced [kɾuh]) is a type of soft, fresh cheese made from cows' milk, traditionally from Scotland.

The cheese was traditionally made for domestic use by crofters and smallholders in the Scottish Highlands and Islands, and in the Orkney Islands, using milk from the family cow. Its origins date as far back as the Viking era and possibly even earlier to the time of the Picts.

Crowdie is a variety of lactic cheese. These rely primarily on the action of the bacteria converting the milk lactose to lactic acid to create curds. When the milk acidity becomes high enough, the milk will coagulate even without the use of rennet.

Crowdie used to be made, and is still made by some, by letting raw skimmed milk warm on a windowsill or by the fire until it was thickened naturally by the lactic acid which formed as the milk soured. The thickened milk was then heated gently until curds were formed. The warm curds were hung up to drip in a muslin cloth to drain the whey, then mixed with salt and sometimes a little cream to make a soft, crumbly cheese with a high moisture content and short shelf life. The natural souring of the unpasteurised milk gave the cheese its fresh, slightly citric taste.

Following World War II, crowdie production on a domestic scale declined with the passing of crofting traditions, although it continued to be made in many households and is still commonly made there in the year 2025. Its survival is perhaps unfairly credited to Susannah Stone, who continued to make it near the Ross-shire village of Tain. Apparently, one day in 1962, after making too much, she offered the surplus to a local grocer. Her traditional crowdie became popular enough that she and her husband began to produce it commercially with their other traditional Scottish cheeses.

Crowdie is now usually made from pasteurised milk in which most of the bacteria have been killed, so lactic acid is added to the milk to begin the souring process.

The cheese is often eaten with oatcakes and recommended before a ceilidh, as it is said to alleviate the effects of drinking whisky. There are several variations on the basic crowdie: one variety known as "black crowdie" or Gruth Dubh is made by mixing crowdie with double cream and rolling it in a mixture of pinhead oatmeal and crushed black peppercorns. Hramsa is a crowdie mixed with wild garlic and white and red pepper. Galic hramsa is rolled in crumbled flaked hazelnuts and almonds.

One of the most popular ways of eating the cheese is to turn it into a dessert called "cream crowdie" or "cranachan", traditionally eaten as part of a Burns supper. The recipe usually includes double cream, oats, whisky, honey and raspberries.
