= Culture of England =

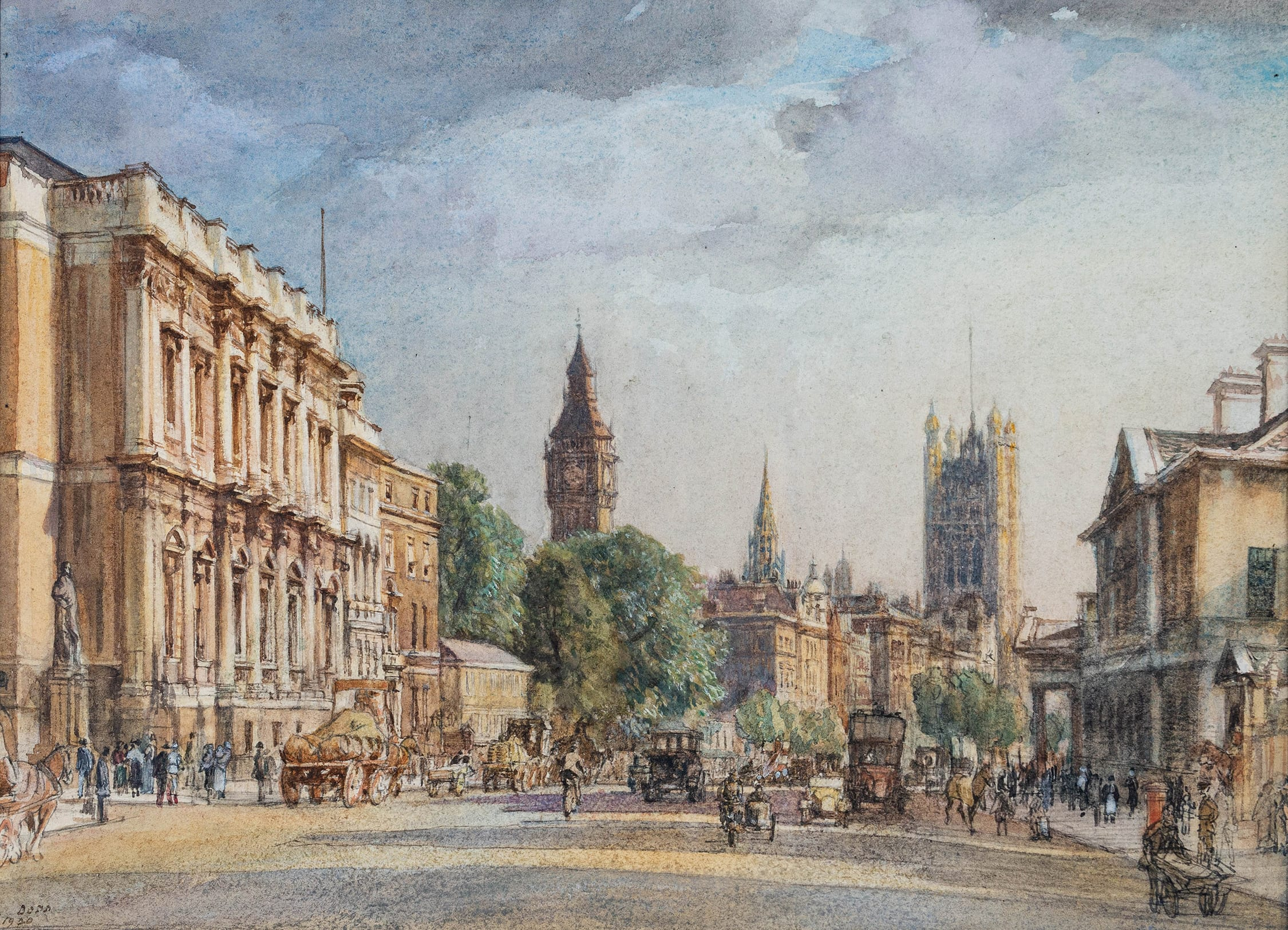
Whitehall by Francis Dodd (1920) displaying the Palace of Westminster

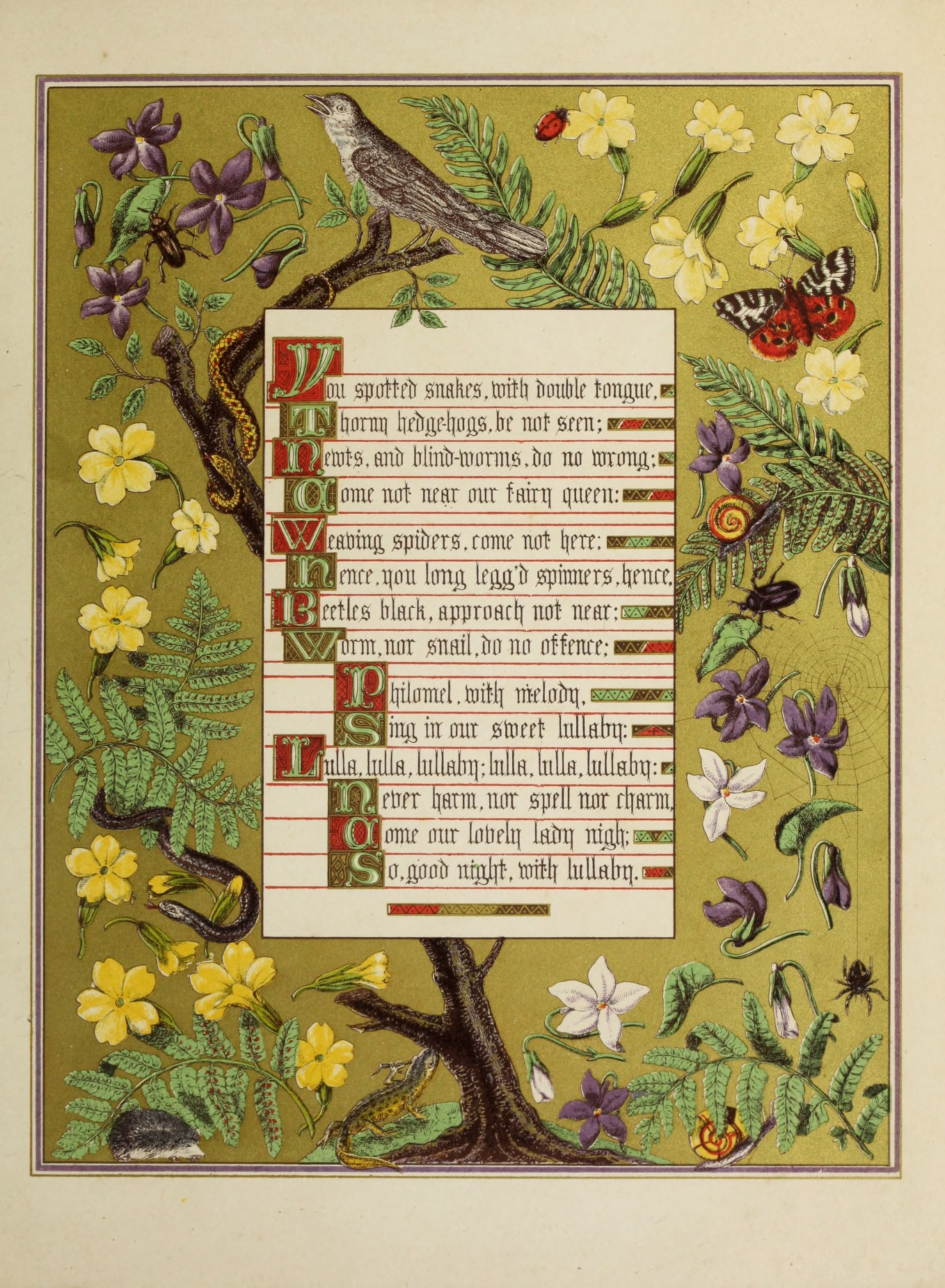
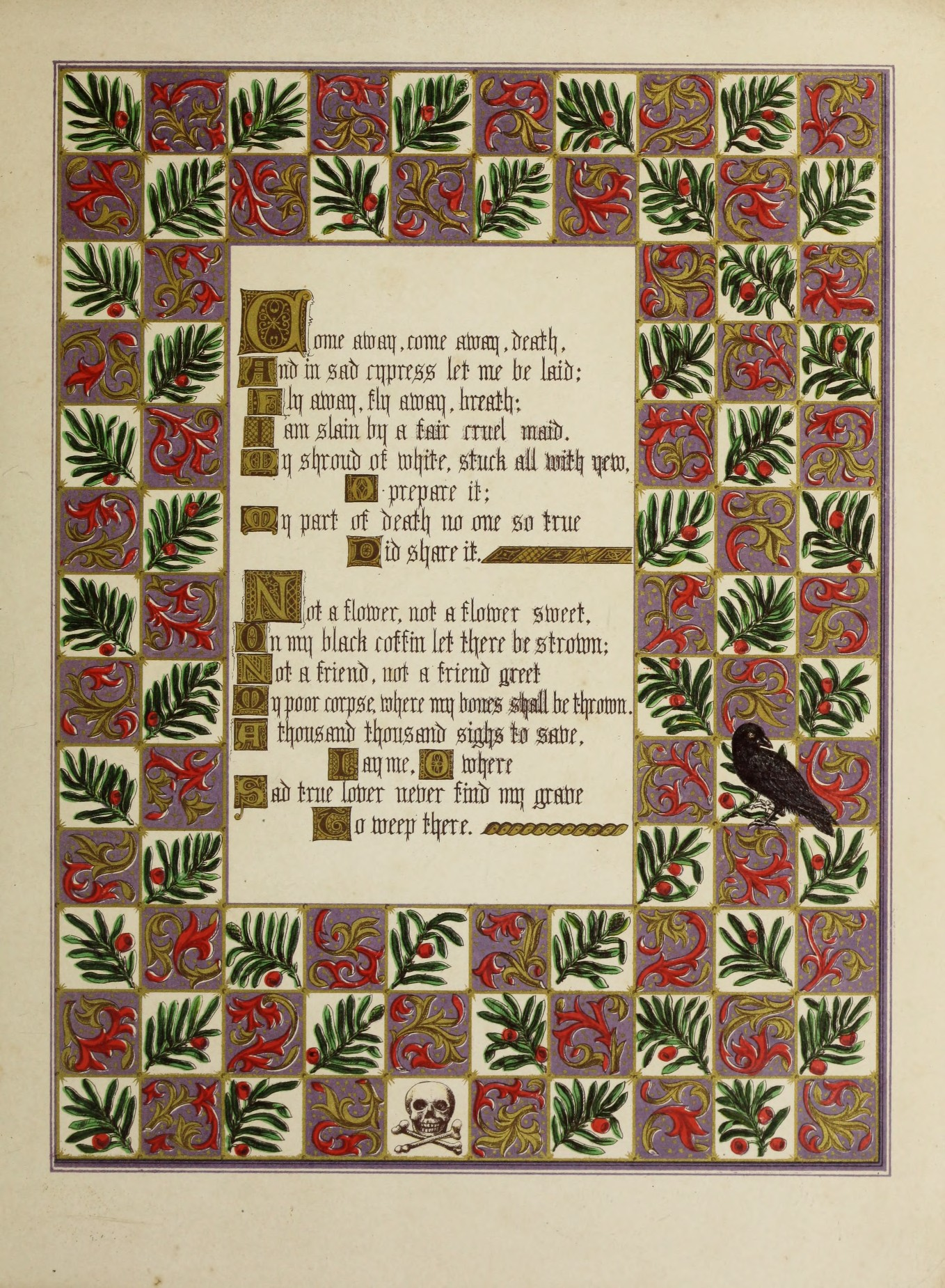
Pages from the "Songs of Shakespeare", illustrated by H.C. Hoskyns Abrahall (19th century)

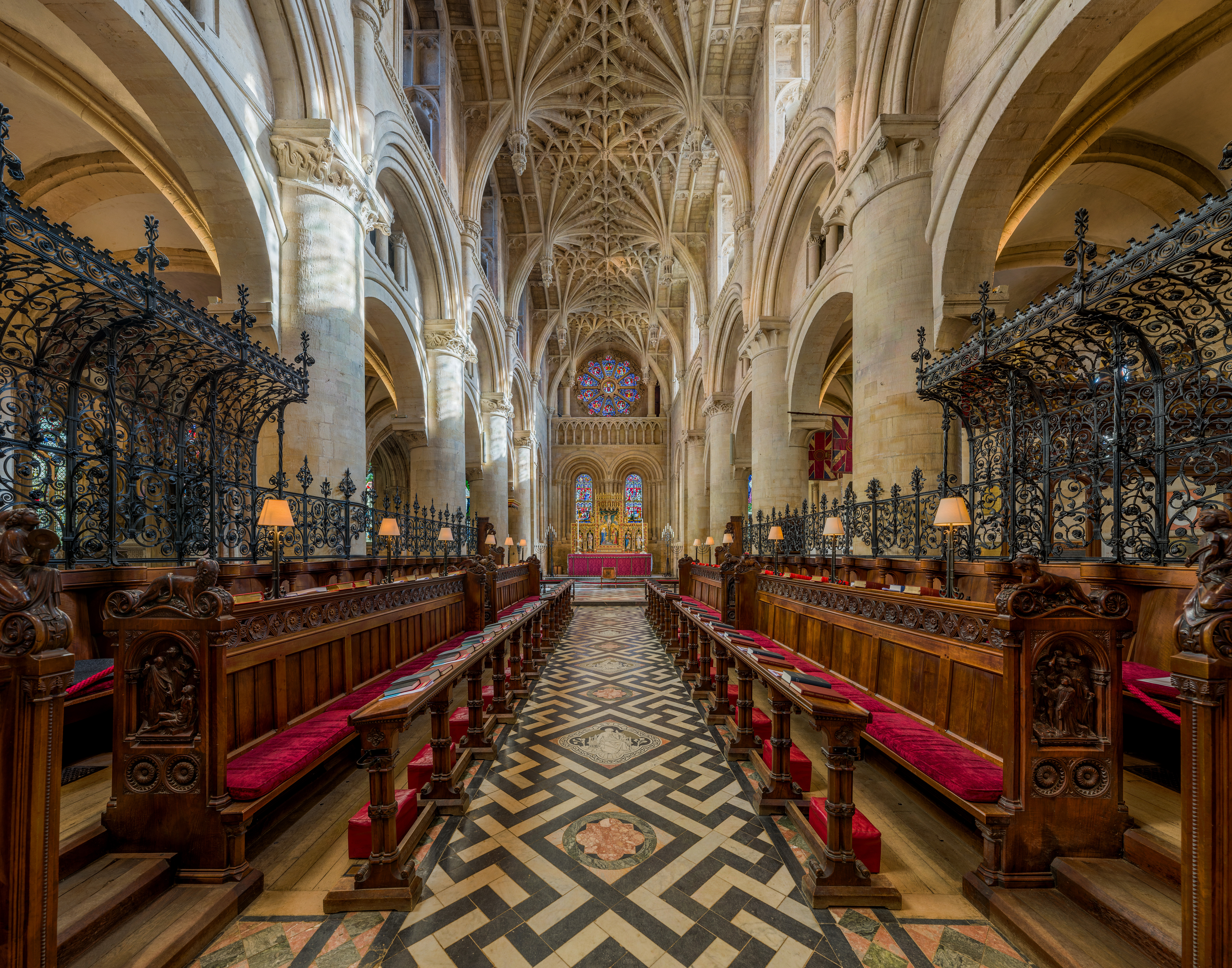
Interior of Christ Church Cathedral in Oxford

Key features of the culture of England include the language, traditions, and beliefs that are common in the country, among much else. Since England’s creation by the Anglo-Saxons, important influences have included the Norman Conquest, Catholicism, Protestantism, and immigration from the Commonwealth and elsewhere, as well as its position in Europe and the Anglosphere. English culture has had major influence across the world, in the British Isles and English colonies such as the United States.

Humour, tradition, and good manners are characteristics commonly associated with being English. England has made significant contributions in the world of literature, cinema, music, art and philosophy. The secretary of state for culture, media and sport is the government minister responsible for the cultural life of England.

Many scientific and technological advancements originated in England, the birthplace of the Industrial Revolution. The country has played an important role in engineering, democracy, shipbuilding, aircraft, motor vehicles, mathematics, science and sport.

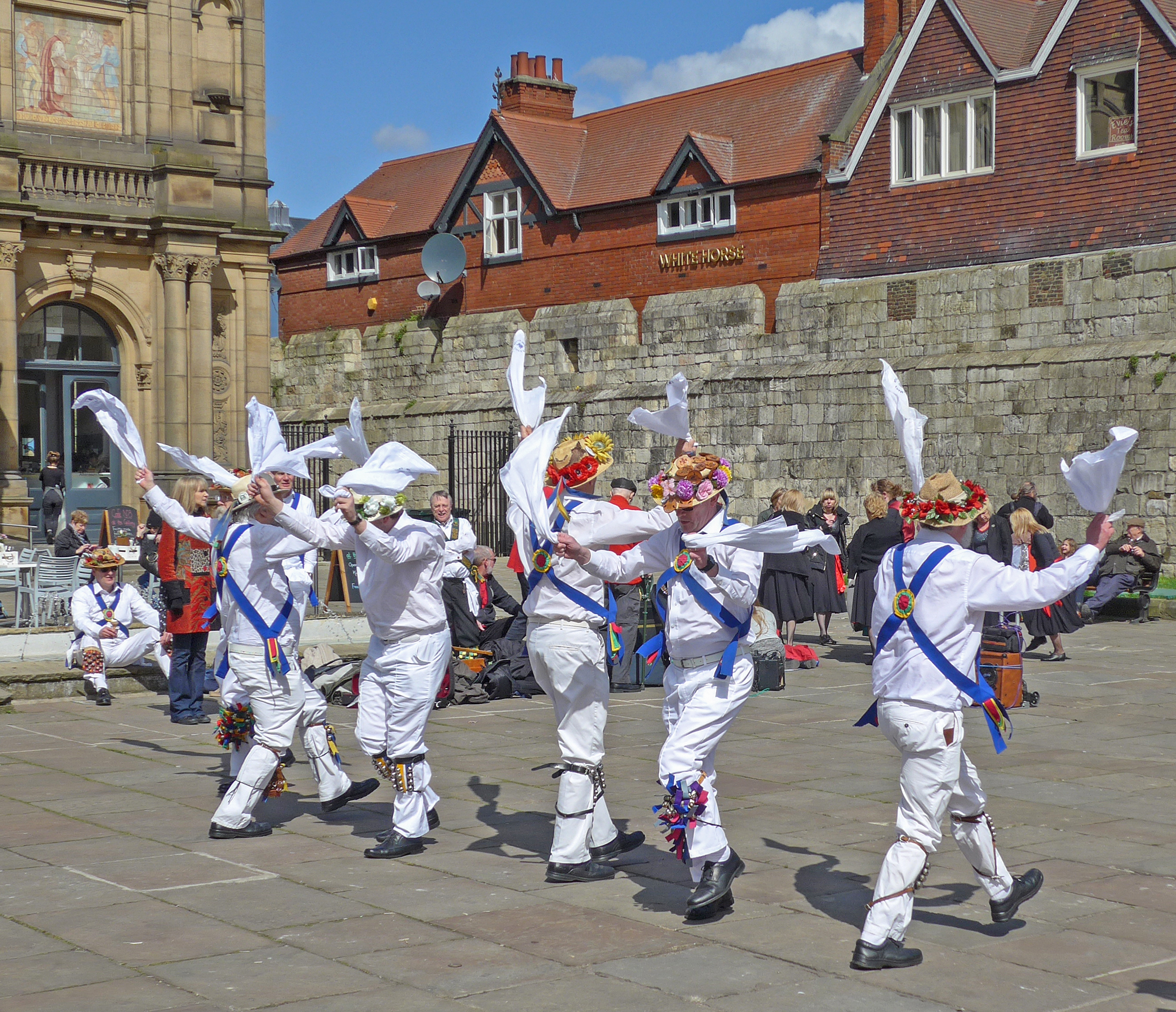
Morris dancing

== Architecture ==
Many ancient standing stone monuments were erected during the prehistoric period; amongst the best known are Stonehenge, Avebury, Devil's Arrows, Rudston Monolith and Castlerigg. With the introduction of Ancient Roman architecture there was a development of basilicas, baths, amphitheatres, triumphal arches, villas, Roman temples, Roman roads, Roman forts, stockades and aqueducts. It was the Romans who founded the first cities and towns such as London, Bath, York, Chester and St Albans. Perhaps the best-known example is Hadrian's Wall stretching right across northern England. Another well-preserved example is the Roman Baths at Bath, Somerset.

English architecture begins with the architecture of the Anglo-Saxons. At least fifty surviving English churches are of Anglo-Saxon origin, although in some cases the Anglo-Saxon part is small and much-altered. All except one timber church are built of stone or brick, and in some cases show evidence of reused Roman work. The architectural character of Anglo-Saxon ecclesiastical buildings ranges from Coptic-influenced architecture in the early period, through Early Christian basilica influenced architecture, to (in the later Anglo-Saxon period) an architecture characterised by pilaster-strips, blank arcading, baluster shafts and triangular-headed openings.

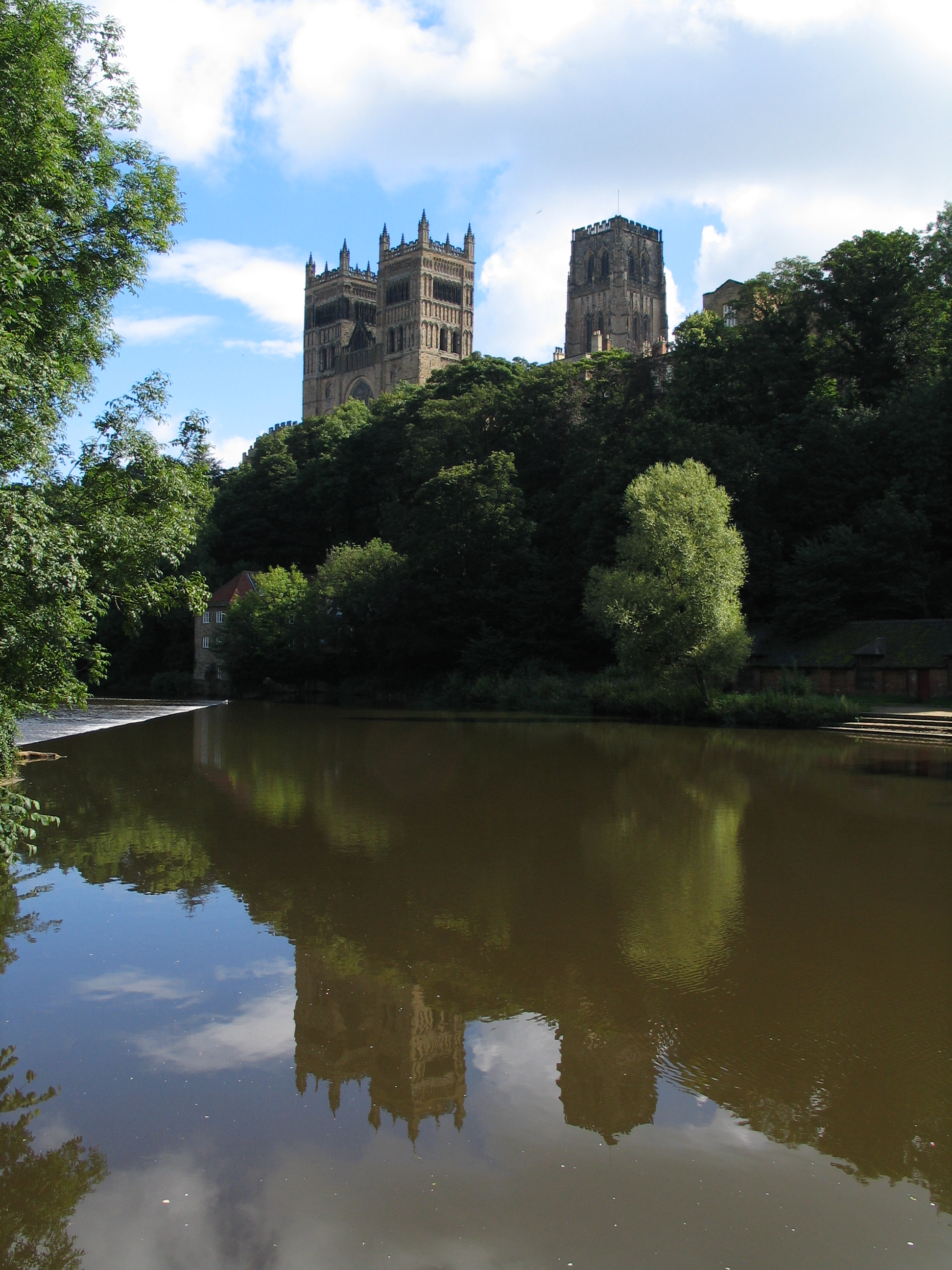
Durham Cathedral, dating from 1093

Many cathedrals of England are ancient, dating from as far back as around 700. They are a major aspect of the country's artistic heritage. Medieval Christianity included the veneration of saints, with pilgrimages to places where particular saints' relics were interred. The possession of the relics of a popular saint was a source of funds for an individual church, as the faithful made donations and benefices in the hope that they might receive spiritual aid, a blessing or a healing from the presence of the physical remains of the holy person. Among those churches to benefit in particular were St Albans Abbey, which contained the relics of England's first Christian martyr; Ripon with the shrine of its founder St. Wilfrid; Durham, which was built to house the body of Saints Cuthbert of Lindisfarne and Aidan; Ely with the shrine of St. Ethelreda; Westminster Abbey with the magnificent shrine of its founder St. Edward the Confessor; at Chichester, the remains of St. Richard; and at Winchester, those of St. Swithun.

All these saints brought pilgrims to their churches, but among them the most renowned was Thomas Becket, the late Archbishop of Canterbury, assassinated by henchmen of King Henry II in 1170. As a place of pilgrimage Canterbury was, in the 13th century, second only to Santiago de Compostela. In the 1170s Gothic architecture was introduced at Canterbury and Westminster Abbey. Over the next 400 years it developed in England, sometimes in parallel with and influenced by Continental forms, but generally with great local diversity and originality.

Following the Norman Conquest Romanesque architecture (known here as Norman architecture) superseded Anglo-Saxon architecture; later there was a period of transition into English Gothic architecture (of which there are three periods, Early English, Decorated, and Perpendicular). Norman architecture was built on a vast scale from the 11th century onwards in the form of castles and churches to help impose Norman authority upon their dominion. Many castles remain from the medieval period, such as Windsor Castle (longest-occupied castle in Europe), Bodiam Castle (a moated castle), Tower of London, and Warwick Castle. Expanding on the Norman base there was also castles, palaces, great houses, universities and parish churches.

English Gothic architecture flourished from the 12th to the early 16th century, and famous examples include Westminster Abbey, the traditional place of coronation for the British monarch, which also has a long tradition as a venue for royal weddings, Canterbury Cathedral, one of the oldest and most famous Christian structures in England; Salisbury Cathedral, which has the tallest church spire in the UK; and York Minster, which is the largest Gothic cathedral in Northern Europe.

Secular medieval architecture throughout England has left a legacy of large stone castles. The invention of gunpowder and canons made castles redundant, and the English Renaissance which followed facilitiated the development of new artistic styles for domestic architecture, notably Tudor, Elizabethan, Jacobean, English Baroque, Queen Anne and Palladian. Architecture during the Tudor dynasty flourished with magnificent royal palaces, such as Nonsuch Palace, Palace of Placentia, Hampton Court Palace, Hatfield House, Richmond Palace and Palace of Beaulieu.

One of the most acclaimed English architects was Sir Christopher Wren. He was employed by King Charles II to design and rebuild London and many of its ruined ancient churches following the Great Fire of London in 1666. Georgian and Neoclassical architecture advanced after the Age of Enlightenment, evoking achievements in elegant architecture and city planning; the Royal Crescent at Bath is one of the best examples of this. The Regency of George IV is noted for its elegance and achievements in architecture and urban planning. Regency style is also applied to interior design and decorative arts of the period, typified by elegant furniture and vertically striped wallpaper, and to styles of clothing; for men, as typified by the dandy Beau Brummell and for women the Empire silhouette. In early modern times there was an influence from Renaissance architecture until by the 18th century. Gothic forms of architecture had been abandoned and various classical styles were adopted. During the Victorian era, Gothic Revival architecture developed in England and was preferred for many types of buildings and city planning. Victorian architecture was widespread and pioneering engineering achievements (bridges, canals, railways, train stations, modern sewer systems) were constructed.

The Industrial Revolution paved the way for buildings such as The Crystal Palace. The introduction of the sheet glass method into England by Chance Brothers in 1832 made possible the production of large sheets of cheap but strong glass, and its use in the Crystal Palace created a structure with the greatest area of glass ever seen in a building. It astonished visitors with its clear walls and ceilings that did not require interior lights. Edwardian architecture followed in the early 20th century. Other buildings such as cathedrals and parish churches are associated with a sense of traditional Englishness, as is often the palatial 'stately home'. Many people are interested in the English country house and the rural lifestyle, evidenced by the number of visitors to properties managed by English Heritage and the National Trust.

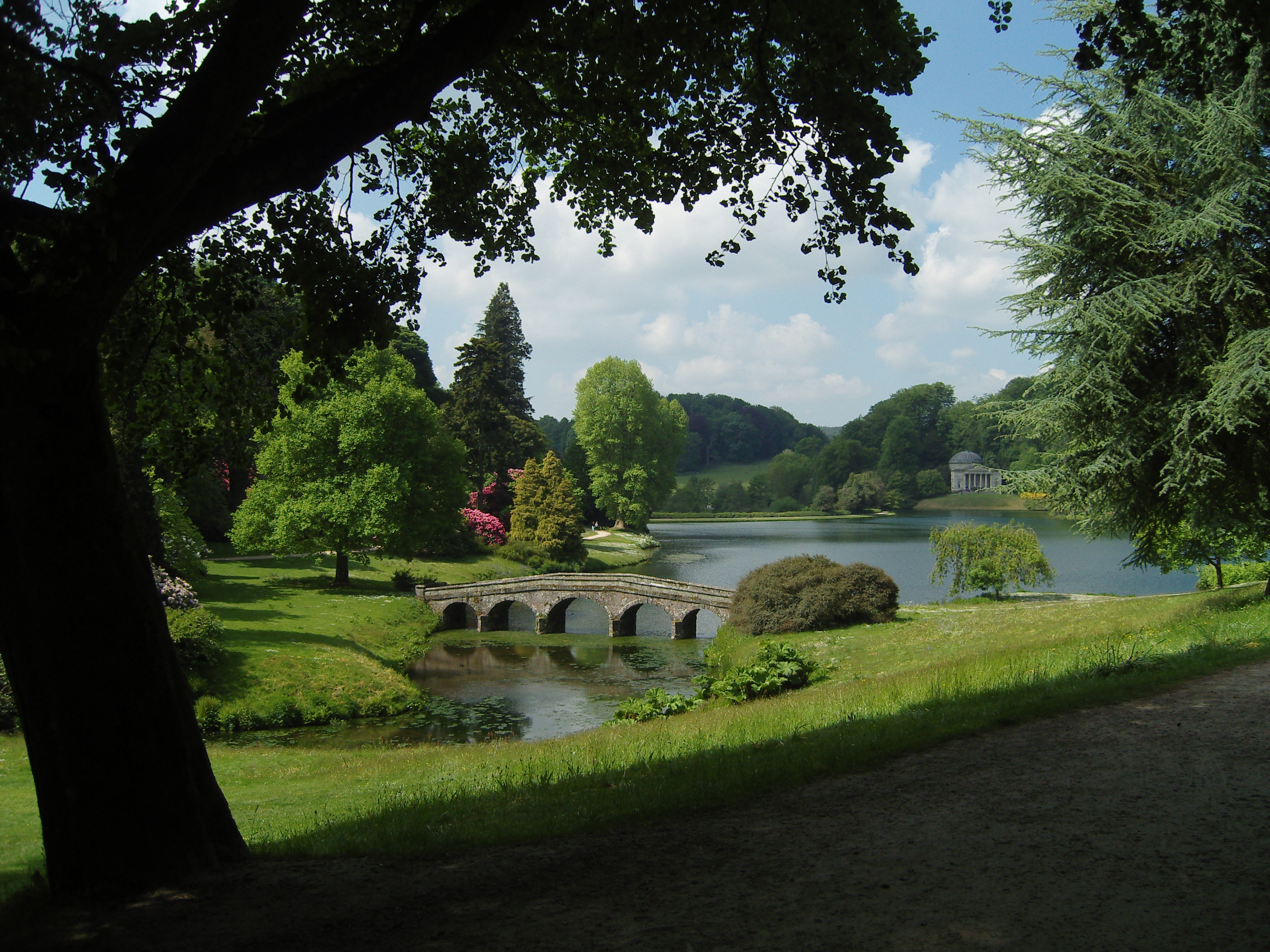
The English landscape garden at Stourhead, described as a 'living work of art' when first opened in the 1750s

Landscape gardening as developed by Capability Brown set an international trend for the English garden. Gardening, and visiting gardens, are regarded as typically English pursuits. By the end of the 18th century the English garden was being imitated by the French landscape garden, and as far away as St. Petersburg, Russia, in Pavlovsk, the gardens of the future Emperor Paul. It also had a major influence on the form of the public parks and gardens which appeared around the world in the 19th century.

Inspired by the great landscape artists of the seventeenth century, the English garden presented an idealized view of nature. At large country houses, the English garden usually included lakes, sweeps of gently rolling lawns set against groves of trees, and recreations of classical temples, Gothic ruins, bridges, and other picturesque architecture, designed to recreate an idyllic pastoral landscape. The English garden was centred on the English country house, stately homes and parks. English Heritage and the National Trust preserve large gardens and landscape parks throughout the country. The RHS Chelsea Flower Show is held every year by the Royal Horticultural Society and is said to be the largest gardening show in the world.

Following the building of the world's first seaside pier at Ryde, the pier became fashionable at seaside resorts in England during the Victorian era, peaking in the 1860s with 22 being built in that decade. A symbol of the typical English seaside holiday, by 1914 more than 100 pleasure piers were located around the UK coast. Regarded as being among the finest Victorian architecture, there are still a significant number of seaside piers of architectural merit still standing, although some have been lost, including two at Brighton in East Sussex and one at New Brighton in the Wirral. Two piers, Brighton's now derelict West Pier and Clevedon Pier, were Grade I listed. The Birnbeck Pier in Weston-super-Mare is the only pier in the world linked to an island. The National Piers Society gives a figure of 55 surviving seaside piers in England.

== Art and design ==
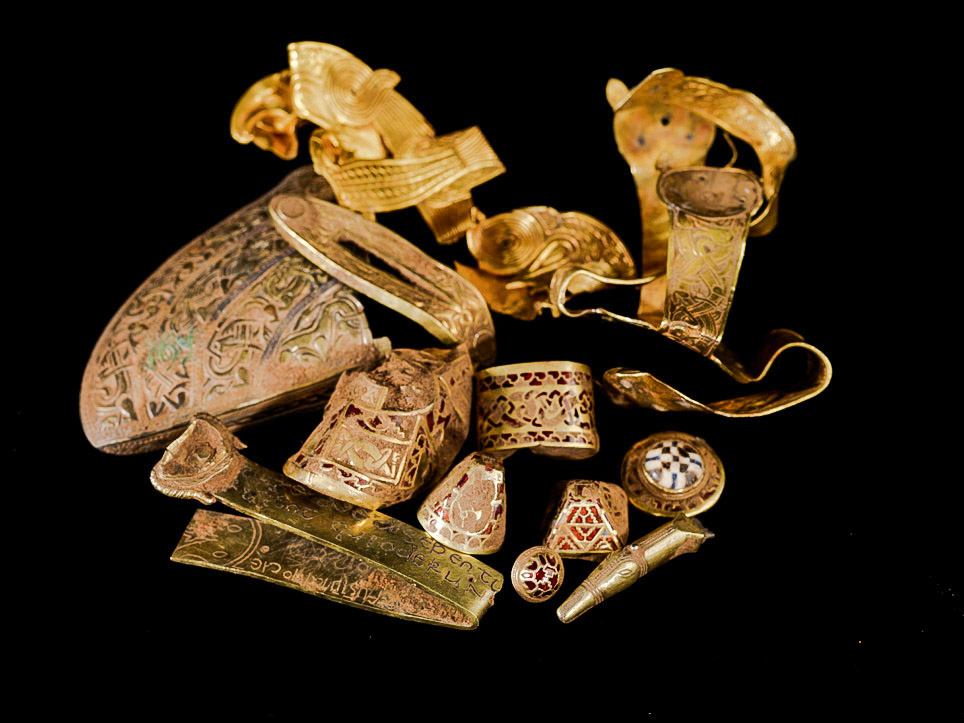
The Staffordshire Hoard is the largest hoard of Anglo-Saxon gold and silver metalwork yet found. It consists of almost 4,600 items and metal fragments.

England has Europe's earliest and northernmost ice-age cave art. Early medieval Anglo-Saxon art saw the development of a distinctly English style, and English art continued thereafter to have a distinct character. English art made after the formation in 1707 of the Kingdom of Great Britain may be regarded in most respects simultaneously as art of the United Kingdom. The two periods of outstanding achievement were the 7th and 8th centuries, with the metalwork and jewellery from Sutton Hoo and a series of magnificent illuminated manuscripts, and the final period after about 950, when there was a revival of English culture after the end of the Viking invasions.

As in most of Europe at the time, metalwork was the most highly regarded form of art by the Anglo-Saxons. Anglo-Saxon taste favoured brightness and colour. Opus Anglicanum ("English work") was recognised as the finest embroidery in Europe. Perhaps the best known piece of Anglo-Saxon art is the Bayeux Tapestry which was commissioned by a Norman patron from English artists working in the traditional Anglo-Saxon style. Anglo-Saxon artists also worked in fresco, stone, ivory and whalebone (notably the Franks Casket), metalwork (for example the Fuller brooch), glass and enamel. Medieval English painting, mainly religious, had a strong national tradition and was influential in Europe.

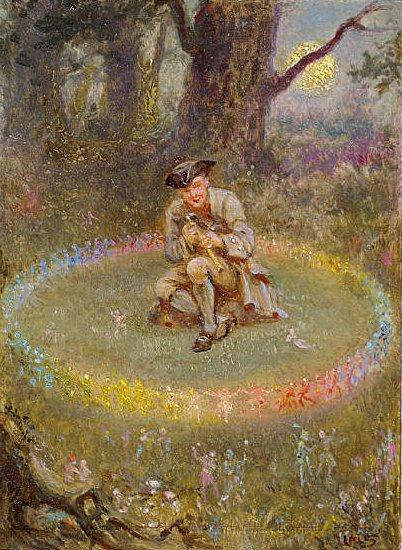
The Fairy Ring by William Holmes Sullivan, c.1908

There is in the art of the English Renaissance a strong interest in portraiture, and the portrait miniature was more popular in England than anywhere else. English Renaissance sculpture was mainly architectural and for monumental tombs. English art was dominated by imported artists throughout much of the Renaissance, but in the 18th century a native tradition became much admired. It is considered to be typified by landscape painting, such as the work of J. M. W. Turner and John Constable. Portraitists like Thomas Gainsborough and Joshua Reynolds were also significant.

In the 18th century, watercolour painting, mostly of landscapes, became an English specialty, with both a buoyant market for professional works, and a large number of amateur painters, many following the popular systems found in the books of Alexander Cozens and others. By the beginning of the 19th century the English artists with the highest modern reputations were mostly dedicated landscape painters, showing the wide range of Romantic interpretations of the English landscape.

Pictorial satirist William Hogarth pioneered Western sequential art, and political illustrations in this style are often referred to as "Hogarthian". Following Hogarth, political cartoons developed in England in the late 18th century under the direction of James Gillray. Regarded as one of the two most influential cartoonists (the other is Hogarth), Gillray has been referred to as the father of the political cartoon, with his satirical work calling the King (George III), prime ministers and generals to account. The early 19th century saw the emergence of the Norwich school of painters, the first provincial art movement outside of London. Its prominent members were "founding father" John Crome (1768–1821), John Sell Cotman (1782–1842), James Stark (1794–1859), and Joseph Stannard (1797–1830).

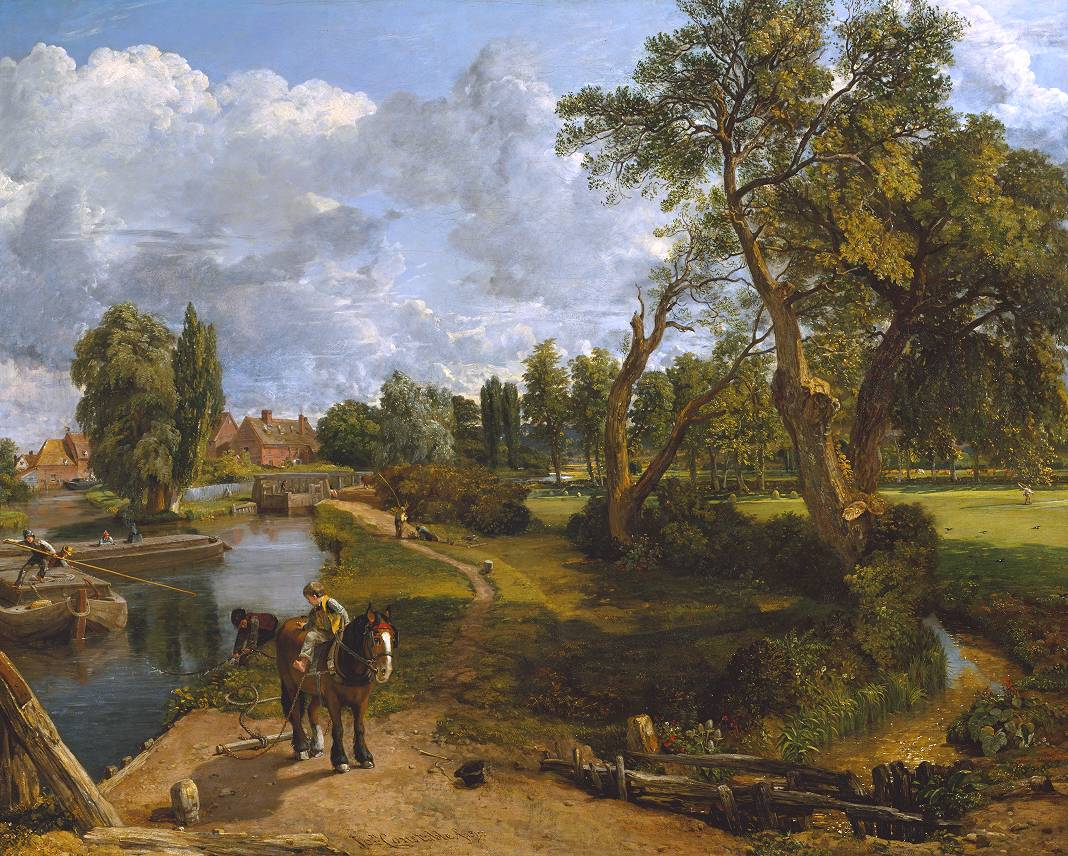
Flatford Mill ('Scene on a Navigable River') by John Constable, c. 1816

During the Baroque and Rococo periods, the first major native portrait painters of the British school were English painters Thomas Gainsborough and Sir Joshua Reynolds, who also specialised in clothing their subjects in an eye-catching manner. Gainsborough's Blue Boy is one of the most famous and recognized portraits of all time, painted with very long brushes and thin oil colour to achieve the shimmering effect of the blue costume. Gainsborough was also noted for his elaborate background settings for his subjects.

The Pre-Raphaelite Brotherhood achieved considerable influence after its foundation in 1848 with paintings that concentrated on religious, literary, and genre subjects executed in a colourful and minutely detailed style. Its artists included John Everett Millais, Dante Gabriel Rossetti and subsequently Edward Burne-Jones. Also associated with it was the designer William Morris, whose efforts to make beautiful objects affordable for everyone led to his wallpaper and tile designs to some extent defining the Victorian aesthetic and instigating the Arts and Crafts movement. The Royal Society of Arts is an organisation committed to the arts and culture.

The Royal Academy in London is a key organisation for the promotion of the visual arts in England. Major schools of art in England include: the six-school University of the Arts London, which includes the Central Saint Martins College of Art and Design and Chelsea College of Art and Design; Goldsmiths, University of London; the Slade School of Fine Art (part of University College London); the Royal College of Art; and The Ruskin School of Drawing and Fine Art (part of the University of Oxford). The Courtauld Institute of Art is a leading centre for the teaching of the history of art. Important art galleries in the United Kingdom include the National Gallery, National Portrait Gallery, Tate Britain and Tate Modern (the most-visited modern art gallery in the world, with around 4.7 million visitors per year).

== Heritage and tourism ==
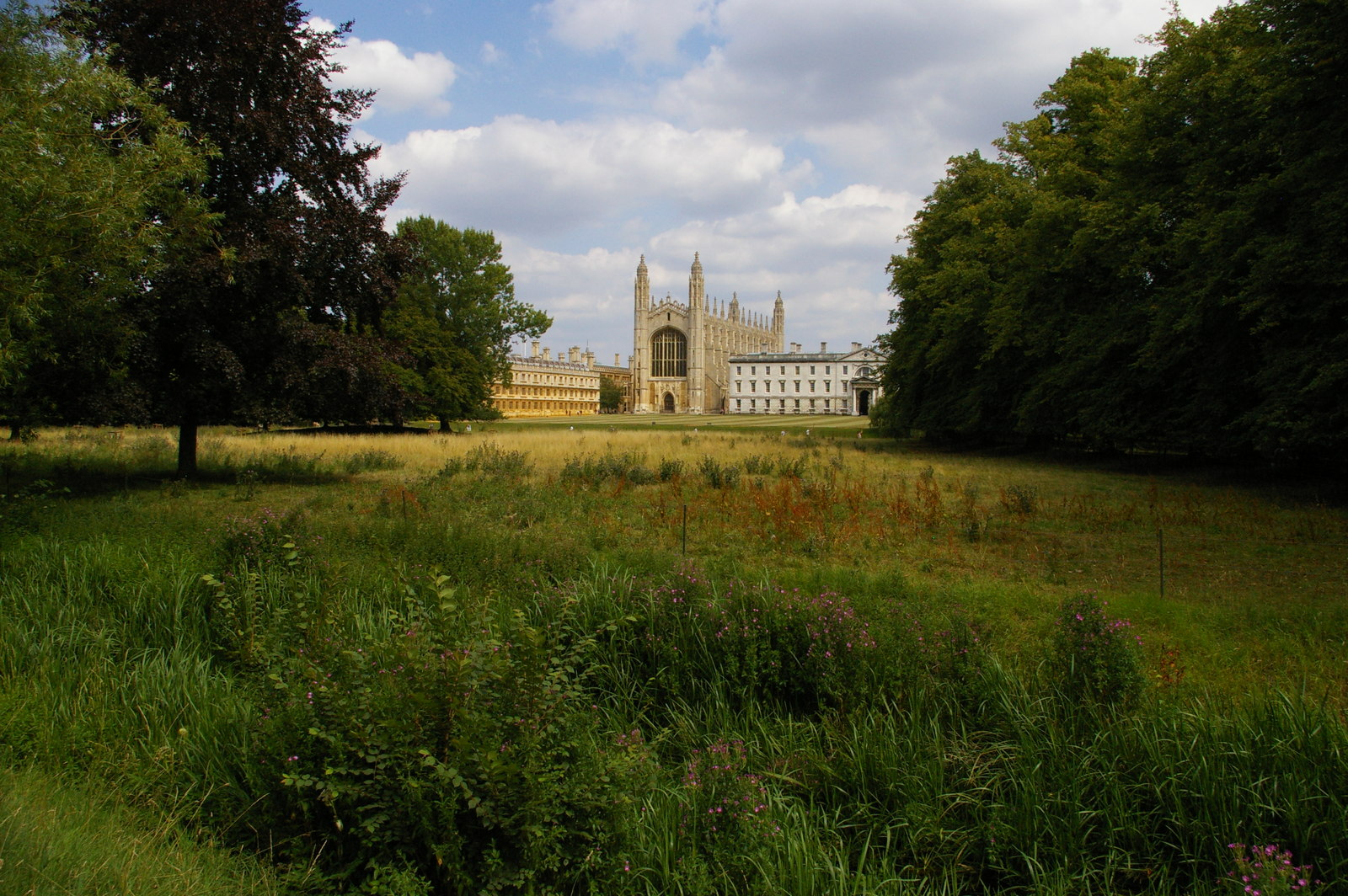
King's College in Cambridge is regarded as one of the greatest examples of late English Gothic architecture. It has the world's largest fan vault, while the chapel's stained-glass windows and wooden chancel screen are considered some of the finest from their era.

A number of umbrella organisations are devoted to the preservation and public access of both natural and cultural heritage, including English Heritage and the National Trust. Membership with them, even on a temporary basis, gives priority free access to their properties.

English Heritage is a governmental body with a broad remit of managing the historic sites, artefacts and environments of England. It is currently sponsored by the Department for Culture, Media and Sport. English Heritage manages more than 400 significant buildings and monuments in England. They also maintain a register of thousands of listed buildings, those which are considered of most importance to the historic and cultural heritage of the country.

Historic England is governmental body sponsored by the Department for Culture, Media and Sport. It is tasked with protecting the historic environment of England by preserving and listing historic buildings, scheduling ancient monuments, registering historic parks and gardens and by advising central and local government. The National Trust for Places of Historic Interest or Natural Beauty is a charity which also maintains multiple sites. One of the largest landowners in the United Kingdom, the Trust owns almost 250,000 hectares of land and 780 miles of coast. Its properties include over 500 historic houses, castles, archaeological and industrial monuments, gardens, parks and nature reserves.

17 of the 25 United Kingdom UNESCO World Heritage Sites fall within England. Some of the best known of these include Hadrian's Wall, Stonehenge, Avebury and Associated Sites, Tower of London, Jurassic Coast, Westminster, Roman Baths in Bath, Saltaire, Ironbridge Gorge, and Studley Royal Park. The northernmost point of the Roman Empire, Hadrian's Wall, is the largest Roman artefact anywhere: it runs a total of 73 miles in northern England.

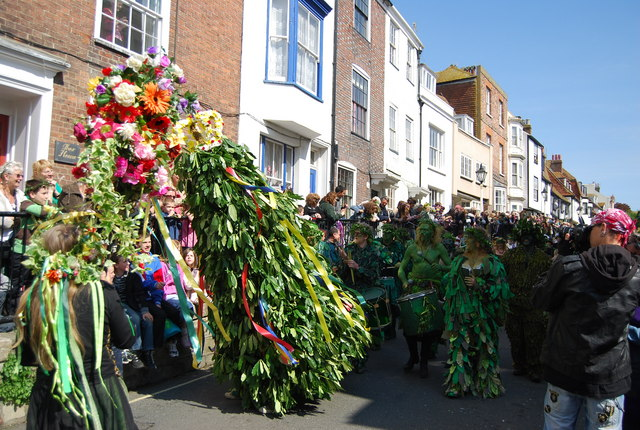
Jack In the Green, a traditional English folk custom being celebrated in Hastings Old Town, known for its many pre-Victorian buildings.

London's British Museum hosts a collection of more than seven million objects is one of the largest and most comprehensive in the world, sourced from every continent, illustrating and documenting the story of human culture from its beginning to the present. The library has two of the four remaining copies of the original Magna Carta, and has a room devoted solely to them. The other two copies are held in Lincoln Castle and Salisbury Cathedral, respectively. The British Library Sound Archive has over six million recordings, many from the BBC Sound Archive, including Winston Churchill's wartime speeches.

The British Library in London is the national library and is one of the world's largest research libraries, holding over 150 million items in all known languages and formats; including around 25 million books. The most senior art gallery is the National Gallery in Trafalgar Square, which houses a collection of over 2,300 paintings dating from the mid-13th century to 1900. The Tate galleries house the national collections of British and international modern art; they also host the famously controversial Turner Prize. The Ashmolean Museum was founded in 1677 from the personal collection of Elias Ashmole, was set up in the University of Oxford to be open to the public and is considered by some to be the first modern public museum. In 2011 there were more than 1,600 museums in England. Most museums and art galleries are free of charge.

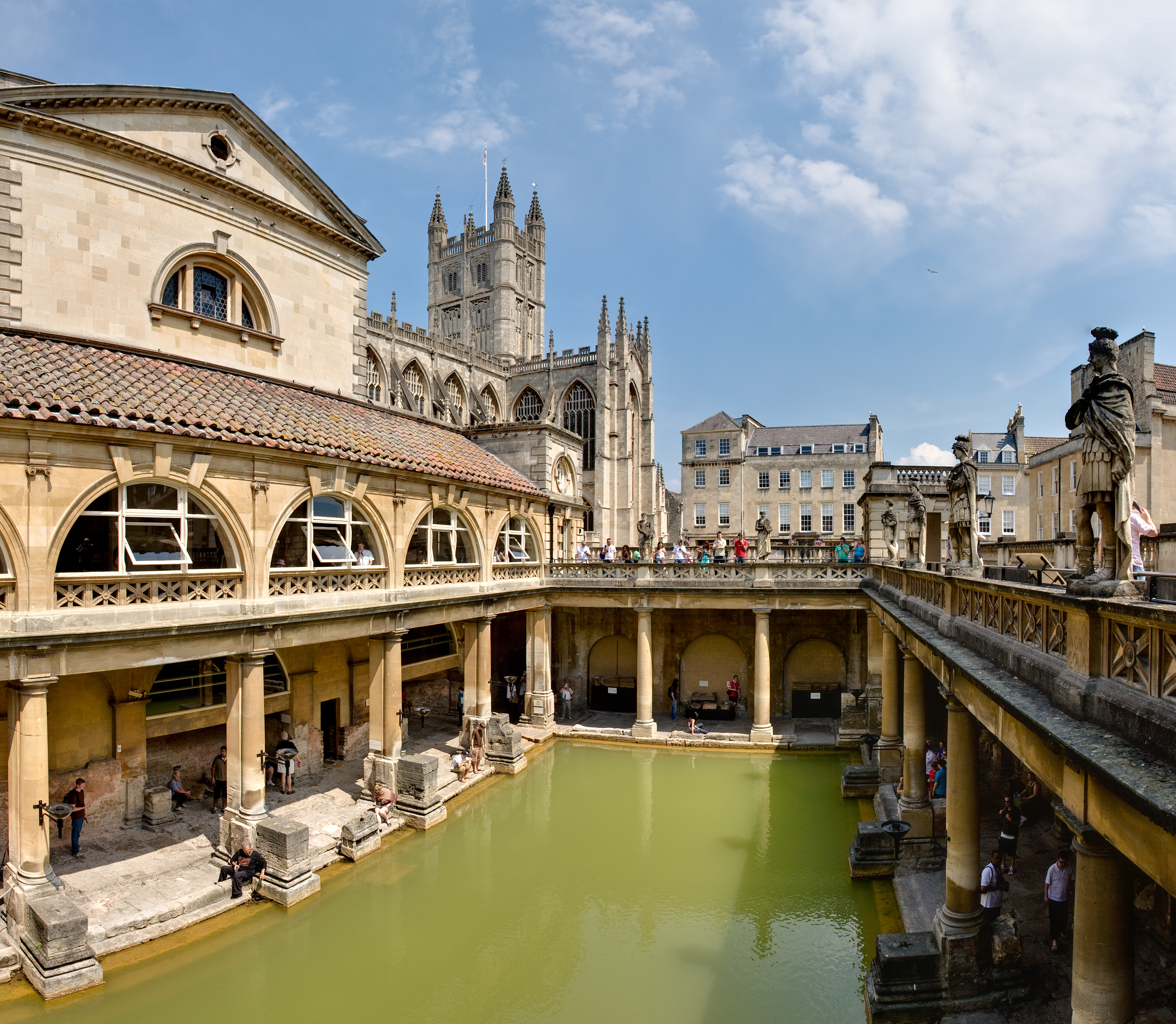
The Roman Baths in Bath; a temple was constructed on the site between 60–70CE in the first few decades of Roman Britain.

A blue plaque, the oldest historical marker scheme in the world, is a permanent sign installed in a public place in the UK to commemorate a link between that location and a famous person or event. The scheme was the brainchild of politician William Ewart in 1863 and was initiated in 1866. It was formally established by the Royal Society of Arts in 1867, and since 1986 has been run by English Heritage.

Tourism plays a significant part in the economic life of England. In 2018, the United Kingdom as a whole was the world's 10th most visited country for tourists, and 17 of the United Kingdom's 25 UNESCO World Heritage Sites fall within England. VisitEngland is the official tourist board for England. VisitEngland's stated mission is to build England's tourism product, raise its profile worldwide, increase the volume and value of tourism exports and develop England and Britain's visitor economy. In 2020, the Lonely Planet travel guide rated England as the second best country to visit that year, after Bhutan.

The Parliamentary Under-Secretary of State for Arts and Heritage is the minister with responsibility over tourism in England, including museums, art galleries, public libraries and the National Archives.

== Literature ==
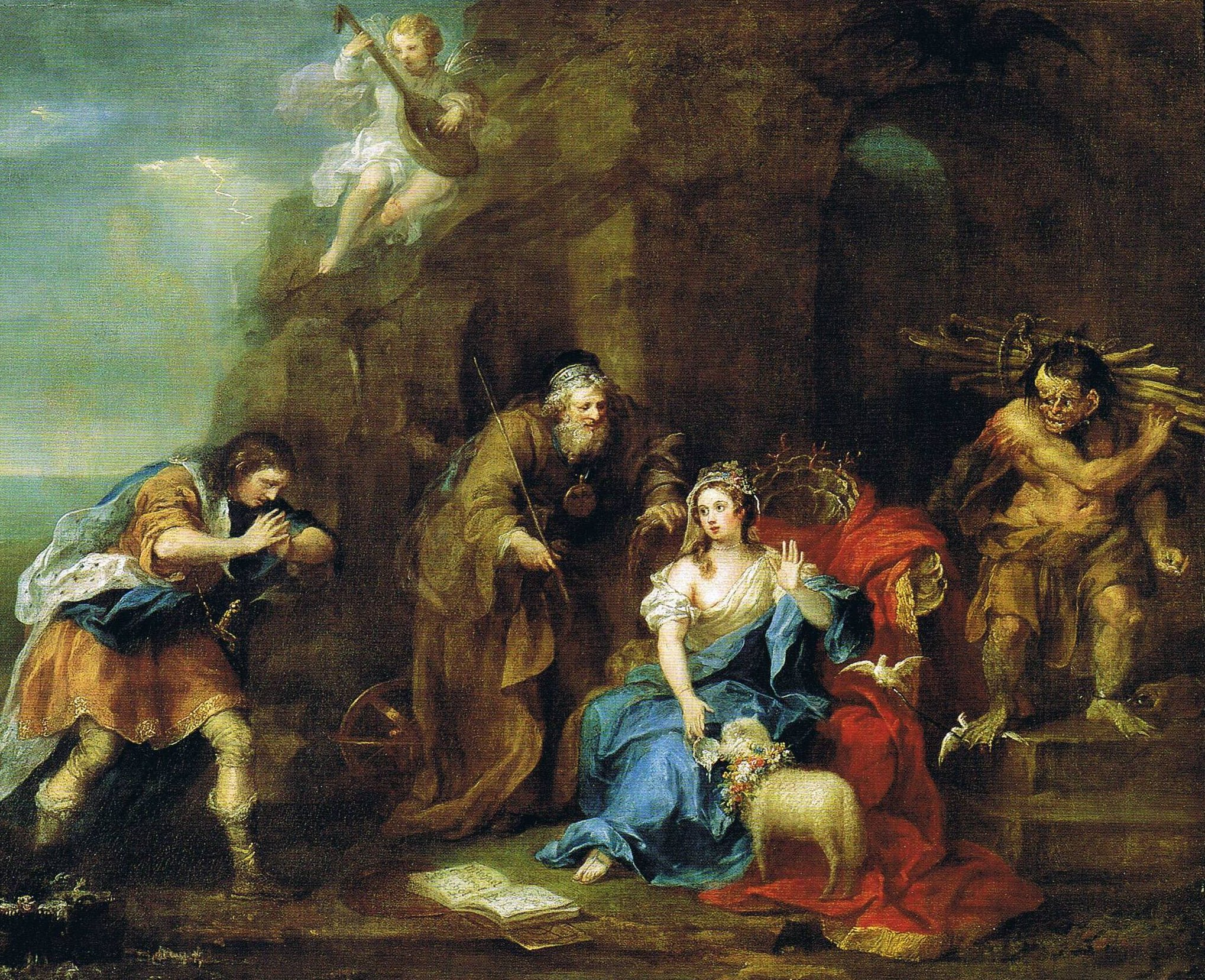
William Hogarth's depiction of a scene from Shakespeare's The Tempest is an example of how English literature influenced English painting in the 18th century.

Early authors such as Bede and Alcuin wrote in Latin. The period of Old English literature provided the epic poem Beowulf and the fragmentary The Battle of Maldon, the sombre and introspective The Seafarer, The Wanderer, the pious Dream of the Rood, The Order of the World, and the secular prose of the Anglo-Saxon Chronicle, along with Christian writings such as Judith, Cædmon's Hymn and hagiographies (biographies of saints). Following the Norman conquest in 1066, Latin continued amongst the educated classes, and an Anglo-Norman literature developed.

Middle English literature emerged with Geoffrey Chaucer, author of The Canterbury Tales, along with Gower, the Pearl Poet and Langland. William of Ockham and Roger Bacon, who were Franciscans, were major philosophers of the Middle Ages. Julian of Norwich, who wrote Revelations of Divine Love, was a prominent Christian mystic.

With the English Renaissance, literature in the Early Modern English style appeared. William Shakespeare, whose works include Hamlet, Romeo and Juliet, Macbeth, and A Midsummer Night's Dream, remains one of the most championed authors in English literature. He is widely regarded as the greatest dramatist of all time.

Christopher Marlowe, Edmund Spenser, Philip Sydney, Thomas Kyd, John Donne, and Ben Jonson are other established authors of the Elizabethan age. Francis Bacon and Thomas Hobbes wrote on empiricism and materialism, including scientific method and social contract. Robert Filmer wrote on the Divine Right of Kings. Andrew Marvell was the best-known poet of the Commonwealth of England, while John Milton authored Paradise Lost during the Restoration.

Some of the most prominent philosophers of the Enlightenment were John Locke, Thomas Paine, Samuel Johnson and Jeremy Bentham. More radical elements were later countered by Edmund Burke, who is regarded as the founder of conservatism. The poet Alexander Pope with his satirical verse became well regarded. The English played a significant role in Romanticism: Samuel Taylor Coleridge, Lord Byron, John Keats, Mary Shelley, Percy Bysshe Shelley, Jane Austen, William Blake and William Wordsworth were major figures.

In response to the Industrial Revolution, agrarian writers sought a way between liberty and tradition; William Cobbett, G. K. Chesterton and Hilaire Belloc were main exponents, while the founder of guild socialism, Arthur Penty, and cooperative movement advocate G. D. H. Cole are somewhat related. Empiricism continued through John Stuart Mill and Bertrand Russell, while Bernard Williams was involved in analytics. Authors from around the Victorian era include Charles Dickens, the Brontë sisters, George Eliot, Rudyard Kipling, Thomas Hardy, H. G. Wells and Lewis Carroll. Since then England has continued to produce novelists such as George Orwell, D. H. Lawrence, Virginia Woolf, C. S. Lewis, Enid Blyton, Aldous Huxley, Agatha Christie, Terry Pratchett, J. R. R. Tolkien, and J. K. Rowling.

Writers often associated with England, or who are seen to express Englishness, include Shakespeare (who produced two tetralogies of history plays about the English kings), Jane Austen, Arnold Bennett, and Rupert Brooke (whose poem "The Old Vicarage, Grantchester" is often considered quintessentially English). Other writers are associated with specific regions of England; these include Charles Dickens (London), Thomas Hardy (Wessex), A. E. Housman (Shropshire), and the Lake Poets (the Lake District).

The 20th-century crime writer Agatha Christie is the best-selling novelist of all time. Her mystery novels are outsold only by Shakespeare and The Bible. Described as "perhaps the 20th century's best chronicler of English culture", the non-fiction works of George Orwell include The Road to Wigan Pier (1937), documenting his experience of working class life in the north of England. Orwell's eleven rules for making tea appear in his essay "A Nice Cup of Tea", which was published in the London Evening Standard on 12 January 1946.

In 2003 the BBC carried out a survey entitled The Big Read to find the "nation's best-loved novel" of all time, with works by J. R. R. Tolkien, Jane Austen, Philip Pullman, Douglas Adams, and J. K. Rowling making up the top five. In 2005, some 206,000 books were published in the United Kingdom and in 2006 it was the largest publisher of books in the world. The Royal Society of Literature was founded in 1820, by King George IV, to "reward literary merit and excite literary talent". The society is a cultural tenant at London's Somerset House.

Due to the expansion of English into a world language during the British Empire, literature is now written in English across the world.

== Music ==
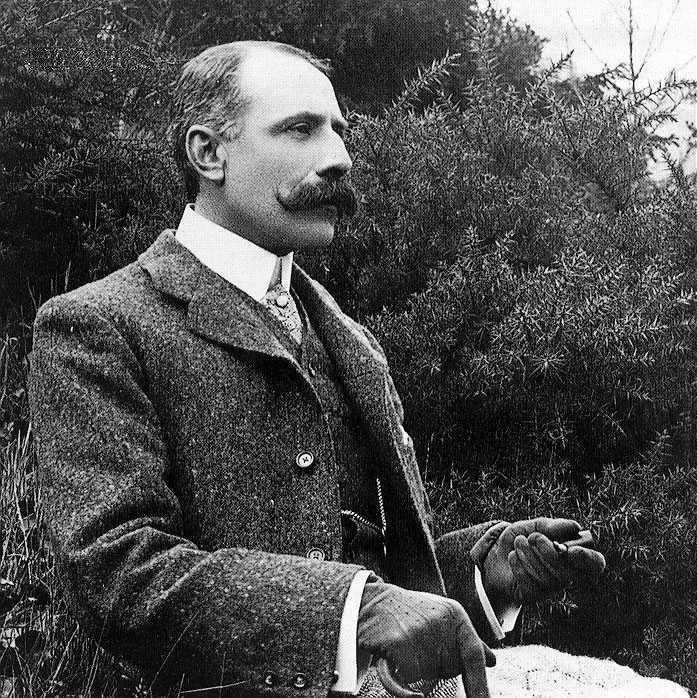
Edward Elgar is one of England's most celebrated classical composers.

England has a long and rich musical history, and more English people attend live music performances than football matches. The traditional folk music of England is centuries old and has contributed to several genres prominently; mostly sea shanties, jigs, hornpipes and dance music. It has its own distinct variations and regional peculiarities. Ballads featuring Robin Hood, printed by Wynkyn de Worde in the 16th century, are an important artefact, as are John Playford's The Dancing Master and Robert Harley's Roxburghe Ballads collections.

Some of the best-known songs are Greensleeves, Pastime with Good Company, Maggie May and Spanish Ladies amongst others. Many nursery rhymes are of English origin such as Mary, Mary, Quite Contrary, Roses Are Red, Jack and Jill, London Bridge Is Falling Down, The Grand Old Duke of York, Hey Diddle Diddle and Humpty Dumpty. Traditional English Christmas carols include We Wish You a Merry Christmas, The First Noel, I Saw Three Ships and God Rest You Merry, Gentlemen.

England, like most European countries, has undergone a roots revival in the last half of the 20th century. English music has been an instrumental and leading part of this phenomenon, which peaked at the end of the 1960s and into the 1970s. The English Musical Renaissance was a hypothetical development in the late 19th and early 20th century, when English composers, often those lecturing or trained at the Royal College of Music, were said to have freed themselves from foreign musical influences, to have begun writing in a distinctively national idiom.

The achievements of the Anglican choral tradition following on from 16th-century composers such as Thomas Tallis, John Taverner and William Byrd have tended to overshadow instrumental composition. The semi-operatic innovations of Henry Purcell were significant. Classical music attracted much attention from 1784 with the formation of the Birmingham Triennial Music Festival, which was the longest running classical music festival of its kind until the final concerts in 1912. George Frideric Handel found important royal patrons and enthusiastic public support in England. He spent most of his composing life in London and became a national icon, creating some of the most well-known works of classical music, especially his English oratorios The Messiah, Solomon, Water Music, and Music for the Royal Fireworks. One of Handel's four Coronation Anthems, Zadok the Priest (1727), composed for the coronation of George II, has been performed at every subsequent British coronation, traditionally during the sovereign's anointing. The Royal Academy of Music is the oldest conservatoire in the UK, founded in 1822. It received its royal charter in 1830 from King George IV. Famous academy alumni include Sir Simon Rattle, Sir Harrison Birtwistle, Sir Elton John, and Annie Lennox.

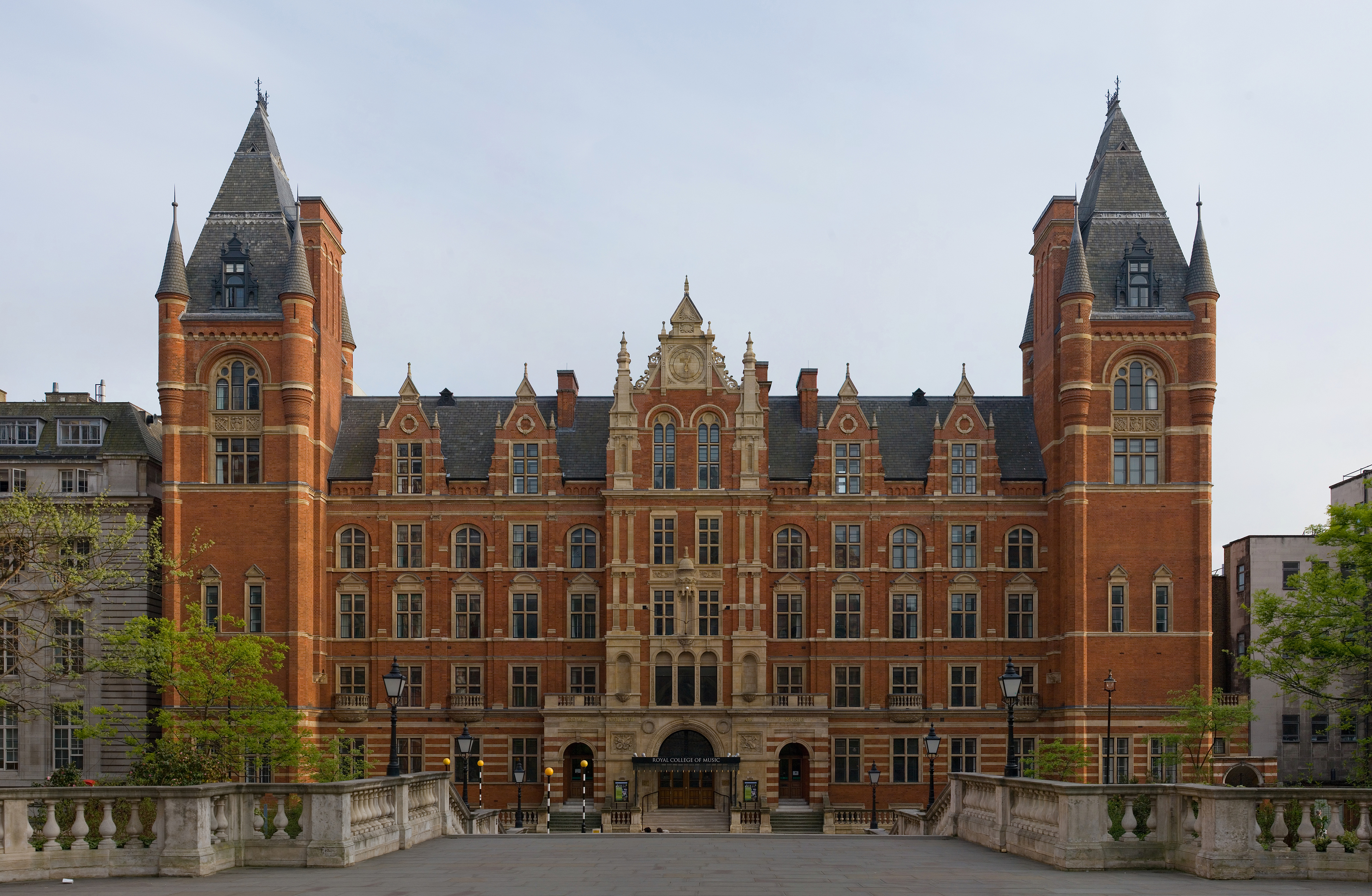
The Royal College of Music is the oldest conservatoire in the UK, established by royal charter in 1882.

The emergence of figures such as Sir Edward Elgar and Sir Arthur Sullivan in the 19th century showed a new vitality in English music. Indeed, whilst President of The Birmingham & Midland Institute in 1888 Sullivan delivered an address at Birmingham Town Hall on the development of music in England. In the 20th century, Benjamin Britten and Michael Tippett emerged as internationally recognised opera composers, and Ralph Vaughan Williams and others collected English folk tunes and adapted them to the concert hall. Cecil Sharp was a leading figure in the English folk revival. The Proms, an annual summer season of daily classical music concerts, is a significant event in English musical life. The Last Night of the Proms features patriotic music.

A new trend emerged from Liverpool in 1962. The Beatles became the most popular musicians of their time, and in the composing duo of John Lennon and Paul McCartney, popularised the concept of the self-contained music act. Before the Beatles, very few popular singers composed the tunes they performed. The "Fab Four" opened the doors for other acts from England such as The Rolling Stones, Led Zeppelin, Pink Floyd, Cream, The Kinks, The Who, Eric Clapton, David Bowie, Queen, Elton John, The Hollies, Black Sabbath, Deep Purple, Genesis, Dire Straits, Iron Maiden, The Police to the globe. Many musical genres have origins in (or strong associations with) England, such as British Invasion, progressive rock, hard rock, Mod, glam rock, heavy metal, Britpop, indie rock, gothic rock, shoegazing, acid house, garage, trip hop, drum and bass and dubstep. The Sex Pistols and The Clash were pioneers of punk rock. Some of England's leading contemporary artists include George Michael, Sting, Seal, Rod Stewart, The Smiths, The Stone Roses, Oasis, Blur, Radiohead, The Cure, Depeche Mode, Coldplay, Def Leppard, Muse, Arctic Monkeys, Adele and Ed Sheeran.

== Cinema ==
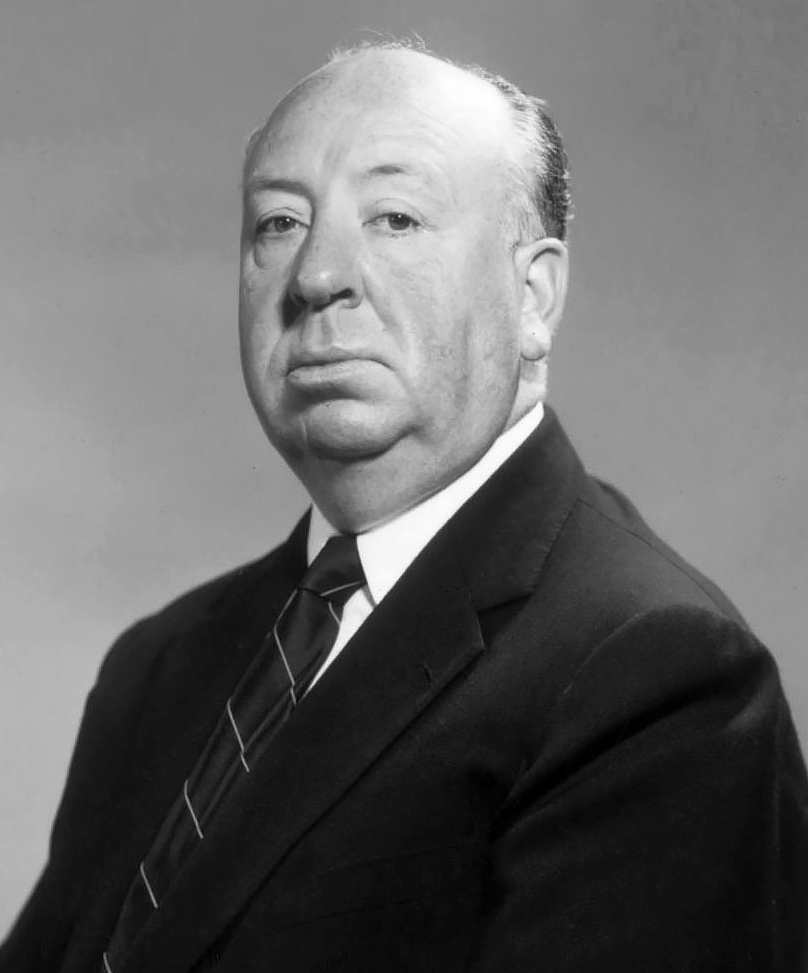
Alfred Hitchcock is often regarded as the greatest British filmmaker, and was described as "a straightforward middle-class Englishman who just happened to be an artistic genius."

England has had a considerable influence on the history of the cinema, producing some of the greatest actors, directors and motion pictures of all time, including Alfred Hitchcock, Charlie Chaplin, David Lean, Laurence Olivier, Vivien Leigh, John Gielgud, Peter Sellers, Julie Andrews, Michael Caine, Gary Oldman, Helen Mirren, Kate Winslet and Daniel Day-Lewis. Hitchcock and Lean are among the most critically acclaimed directors of all time. Hitchcock's first thriller, The Lodger: A Story of the London Fog (1926), helped shape the thriller genre in film, while his 1929 film, Blackmail, is often regarded as the first British sound feature film.

Major film studios in England include Pinewood, Elstree and Shepperton. Some of the most commercially successful films of all time have been produced in England, including two of the highest-grossing film franchises (Harry Potter and James Bond). Ealing Studios in London has a claim to being the oldest continuously working film studio in the world. Famous for recording many motion picture film scores, the London Symphony Orchestra first performed film music in 1935.

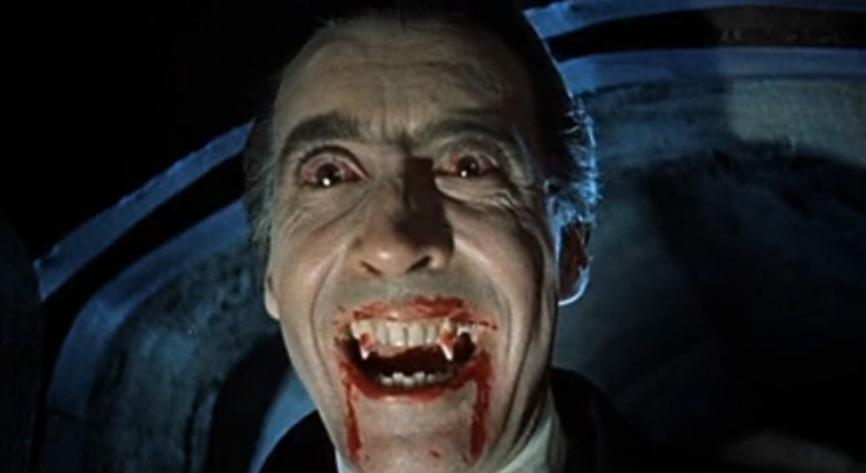
Christopher Lee (seen here as Dracula in 1958) starred in many of Hammer's British horror films.

The BFI Top 100 British films includes Monty Python's Life of Brian (1979), a film regularly voted the funniest of all time by the UK public. English producers are also active in international co-productions and English actors, directors and crew feature regularly in Hollywood films. Ridley Scott was among a group of English filmmakers, including Tony Scott, Alan Parker, Hugh Hudson and Adrian Lyne, who emerged from making 1970s UK television commercials. The UK film council ranked David Yates, Christopher Nolan, Mike Newell, Ridley Scott and Paul Greengrass the five most commercially successful English directors since 2001. Other contemporary directors from England include Sam Mendes, Guy Ritchie and Steve McQueen. Current actors include Tom Hardy, Daniel Craig, Benedict Cumberbatch and Emma Watson. Acclaimed for his motion capture work, Andy Serkis opened The Imaginarium Studios in London in 2011. The visual effects company Framestore in London has produced some of the most critically acclaimed special effects in modern film. Many successful Hollywood films have been based on English people, stories or events. The 'English Cycle' of Disney animated films include Alice in Wonderland, The Jungle Book, Robin Hood and Winnie the Pooh.

== Theatre ==
The peak of English drama and theatre is said to be the age of Elizabeth I; a golden age in English history where the arts, drama and creative work flourished. Morality plays emerged as a distinct dramatic form around 1400 and flourished in the early Elizabethan era in England. Characters were often used to represent different ethical ideals. Everyman, for example, includes such figures as Good Deeds, Knowledge and Strength, and this characterisation reinforces the conflict between good and evil for the audience. The Castle of Perseverance (c. 1400–1425) depicts an archetypal figure's progress from birth through to death. Horestes (c. 1567), a late "hybrid morality" and one of the earliest examples of an English revenge play, brings together the classical story of Orestes with a Vice from the medieval allegorical tradition, alternating comic, slapstick scenes with serious, tragic ones. Also important in this period were the folk dramas of the Mummers Play, performed during the Christmas season. Court masques were particularly popular during the reign of Henry VIII. The first permanent English theatre, the Red Lion, opened in 1567. The first successful theatres, such as The Theatre, opened in 1576. The establishment of large and profitable public theatres was an essential enabling factor in the success of English Renaissance drama.

Archaeological excavations on the foundations of the Rose and the Globe in the late 20th century showed that all the London theatres had individual differences, but their common function necessitated a similar general plan. The public theatres were three stories high, and built around an open space at the centre. Usually polygonal in plan to give an overall rounded effect, although the Red Bull and the first Fortune were square. The three levels of inward-facing galleries overlooked the open centre, into which jutted the stage: essentially a platform surrounded on three sides by the audience. The rear side was restricted for the entrances and exits of the actors and seating for the musicians. The upper level behind the stage could be used as a balcony, as in Romeo and Juliet and Antony and Cleopatra, or as a position from which an actor could harangue a crowd, as in Julius Caesar.

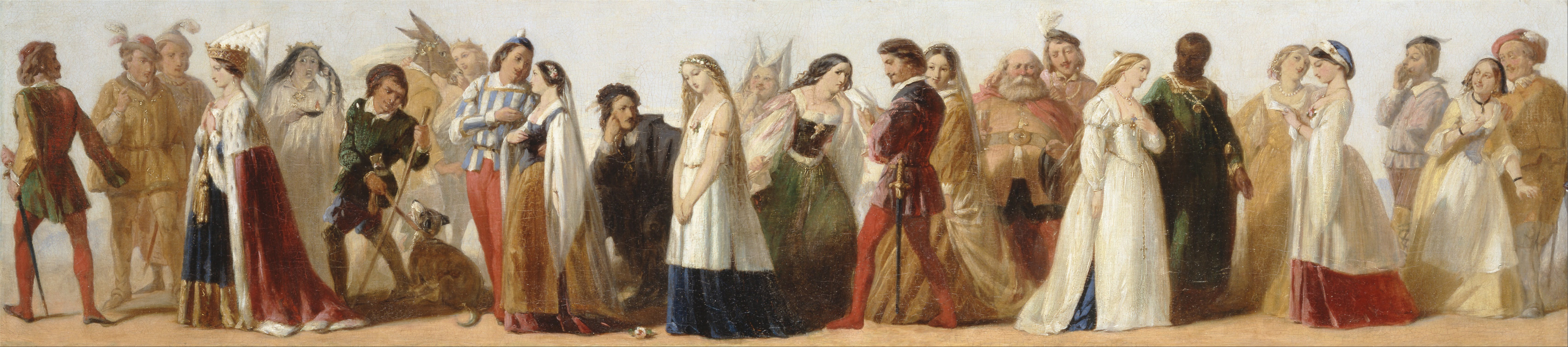
Procession of characters from Shakespeare's plays

The growing population of England, the growing wealth of its people, and their fondness for spectacle produced a dramatic literature of remarkable variety, quality, and extent. Genres of the period included the history play, which depicted English or European history. Shakespeare's plays about the lives of kings, such as Richard III and Henry V, belong to this category, as do Christopher Marlowe's Edward II and George Peele's Famous Chronicle of King Edward the First. History plays dealt with more recent events, like A Larum for London which dramatizes the sack of Antwerp in 1576. Tragedy was a very popular genre. Marlowe's tragedies were exceptionally successful, such as Dr. Faustus and The Jew of Malta. The audiences particularly liked revenge dramas, such as Thomas Kyd's The Spanish Tragedy. The four tragedies considered to be Shakespeare's greatest (Hamlet, Othello, King Lear, and Macbeth) were composed during this period.

Comedies were common. A subgenre developed in this period was the city comedy, which deals satirically with life in London after the fashion of Roman New Comedy. Examples are Thomas Dekker's The Shoemaker's Holiday and Thomas Middleton's A Chaste Maid in Cheapside. Though marginalised, the older genres like pastoral (The Faithful Shepherdess, 1608), and even the morality play (Four Plays in One, ca. 1608–13) could exert influences. After about 1610, the new hybrid subgenre of the tragicomedy enjoyed an efflorescence, as did the masque throughout the reigns of the first two Stuart kings, James I and Charles I.

The re-opening of the theatres in 1660 after the Restoration of Charles II signalled a renaissance of English drama. With the restoration of the monarch in 1660 came the restoration of and the reopening of the theatre. English comedies written and performed in the Restoration period from 1660 to 1710 are collectively called Restoration comedy. Restoration comedy is notorious for its sexual explicitness, a quality encouraged by Charles II (1660–1685) personally and by the rakish aristocratic ethos of his Royal court. For the first time women were allowed to act, putting an end to the practice of the boy-player taking the parts of women. Socially diverse audiences included both aristocrats, their servants and hangers-on, and a substantial middle-class segment. Its dramatists stole freely from English Jacobean and Caroline plays, and even from Greek and Roman classical comedies, combining the various plotlines in adventurous ways.

Restoration audiences liked to see good triumph in their tragedies and rightful government restored. In comedy they liked to see the love-lives of the young and fashionable, with a central couple bringing their courtship to a successful conclusion (often overcoming the opposition of the elders to do so). Heroines had to be chaste, but were independent-minded and outspoken; now that they were played by women, there was more mileage for the playwright in disguising them in men's clothes or giving them narrow escape from rape. These playgoers were attracted to the comedies by up-to-the-minute topical writing, by crowded and bustling plots, by the introduction of the first professional actresses, and by the rise of the first celebrity actors. This period saw the first professional woman playwright, Aphra Behn. In the mid-1690s, a brief second Restoration comedy renaissance arose, aimed at a wider audience.

The unsentimental or "hard" comedies of John Dryden, William Wycherley, and George Etherege reflected the atmosphere at Court and celebrated with frankness an aristocratic macho lifestyle of unremitting sexual intrigue and conquest. The Earl of Rochester, real-life Restoration rake, courtier and poet, is flatteringly portrayed in Etherege's The Man of Mode (1676) as a riotous, witty, intellectual, and sexually irresistible aristocrat, a template for posterity's idea of the glamorous Restoration rake (actually never a very common character in Restoration comedy). The single play that does most to support the charge of obscenity levelled then and now at Restoration comedy is probably Wycherley's masterpiece The Country Wife (1675), whose title contains a lewd pun and whose notorious "china scene" is a series of sustained double entendres.

During the second wave of Restoration comedy in the 1690s, the "softer" comedies of William Congreve and John Vanbrugh set out to appeal to more socially diverse audience with a strong middle-class element, as well as to female spectators. The comic focus shifts from young lovers outwitting the older generation to the vicissitudes of marital relations. In Congreve's Love for Love (1695) and The Way of the World (1700), the give-and-take set pieces of couples testing their attraction for one another have mutated into witty prenuptial debates on the eve of marriage, as in the latter's "Proviso" scene. Vanbrugh's The Provoked Wife (1697) has a light touch and more humanly recognisable characters, while The Relapse (1696) has been admired for its throwaway wit and the characterisation of Lord Foppington, an extravagant and affected burlesque fop with a dark side.

As a reaction to the decadence of Charles II era productions, sentimental comedy grew in popularity. This genre focused on encouraging virtuous behaviour by showing middle class characters overcoming a series of moral trials. Playwrights like Colley Cibber and Richard Steele believed that humans were inherently good but capable of being led astray. Through plays such as The Conscious Lovers and Love's Last Shift they strove to appeal to an audience's noble sentiments so that viewers could be reformed. The Restoration spectacular hit the London public stage in the late 17th-century Restoration period, enthralling audiences with action, music, dance, moveable scenery, baroque illusionistic painting, gorgeous costumes, and special effects such as trapdoor tricks, "flying" actors, and fireworks.

Today there are a variety of theatres in London's West End. Andrew Lloyd Webber dominated the West End for many years; his musicals also conquered Broadway and were made into films. The prestigious Royal Shakespeare Company operates out of Shakespeare's hometown of Stratford-upon-Avon and performs primarily, but not exclusively, his works. Important modern playwrights are Alan Ayckbourn, John Osborne, Harold Pinter, Tom Stoppard and Arnold Wesker.

== Performing arts ==
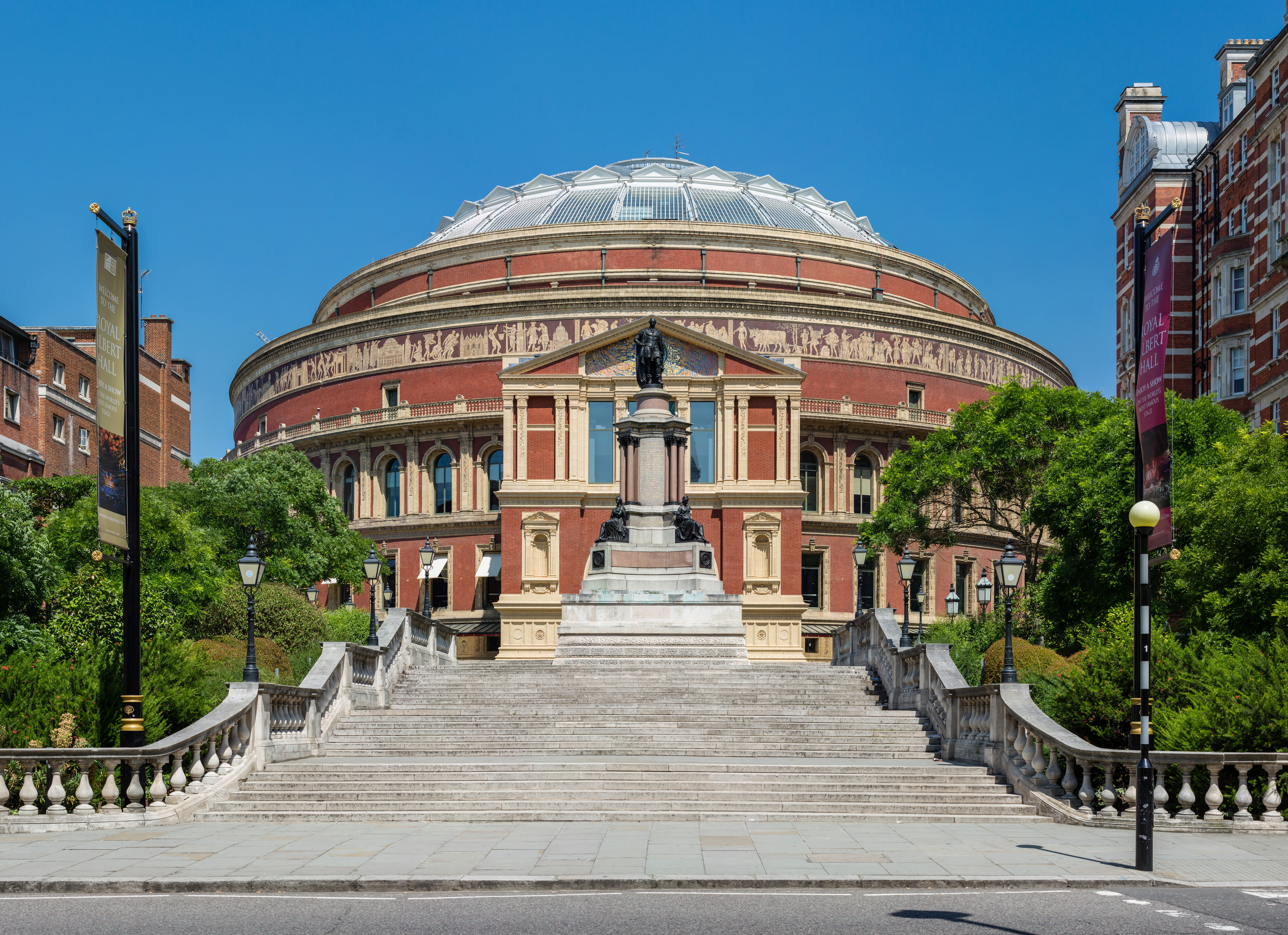
National performing arts are held annually at the Royal Albert Hall, as well as The Proms during the summer.

Large outdoor music festivals in the summer and autumn are popular, such as Glastonbury (the largest greenfield festival in the world), V Festival, Reading and Leeds Festivals. England was at the forefront of the illegal, free rave movement from the late 1980s, which led to the pan-European culture of teknivals mirrored on the UK free festival movement and associated travelling lifestyle. The most prominent opera house in England is the Royal Opera House at Covent Garden. The Proms, a season of orchestral classical music concerts held at the Royal Albert Hall, is a major cultural event held annually. The season is a significant event in English culture and in classical music. Czech conductor Jiří Bělohlávek described the Proms as "the world's largest and most democratic musical festival".

The Royal Ballet is one of the world's foremost classical ballet companies, based at the Royal Opera House. The company employs approximately 100 dancers and has purpose-built facilities. Its reputation built on two prominent figures of 20th century dance, prima ballerina Margot Fonteyn and choreographer Frederick Ashton. Since the Royal Albert Hall's opening by Queen Victoria in 1871, the world's leading artists from many performance genres have appeared on its stage. It is the venue for The Proms concerts, which have been held there every summer since 1941. It is host to more than 390 shows in the main auditorium annually, including classical, rock and pop concerts, ballet, opera, film screenings with live orchestral accompaniment. England is home to numerous major orchestras such as the BBC Symphony Orchestra, the Royal Philharmonic Orchestra, the Philharmonia Orchestra, and the London Symphony Orchestra.

A staple of English easide culture, the quarrelsome couple Punch and Judy made their first recorded appearance in Covent Garden, London in 1662. The various episodes of Punch and Judy are performed in the spirit of outrageous comedy—often provoking shocked laughter—and are dominated by the anarchic clowning of Mr. Punch. Regarded as English cultural icons, they appeared at a significant period in English history, with Glyn Edwards stating: Pulcinella went down particularly well with Restoration English audiences, fun-starved after years of Puritanism. We soon changed Punch's name, transformed him from a marionette to a hand puppet, and he became, really, a spirit of Britain – a subversive maverick, a kind of puppet equivalent to our political cartoons.

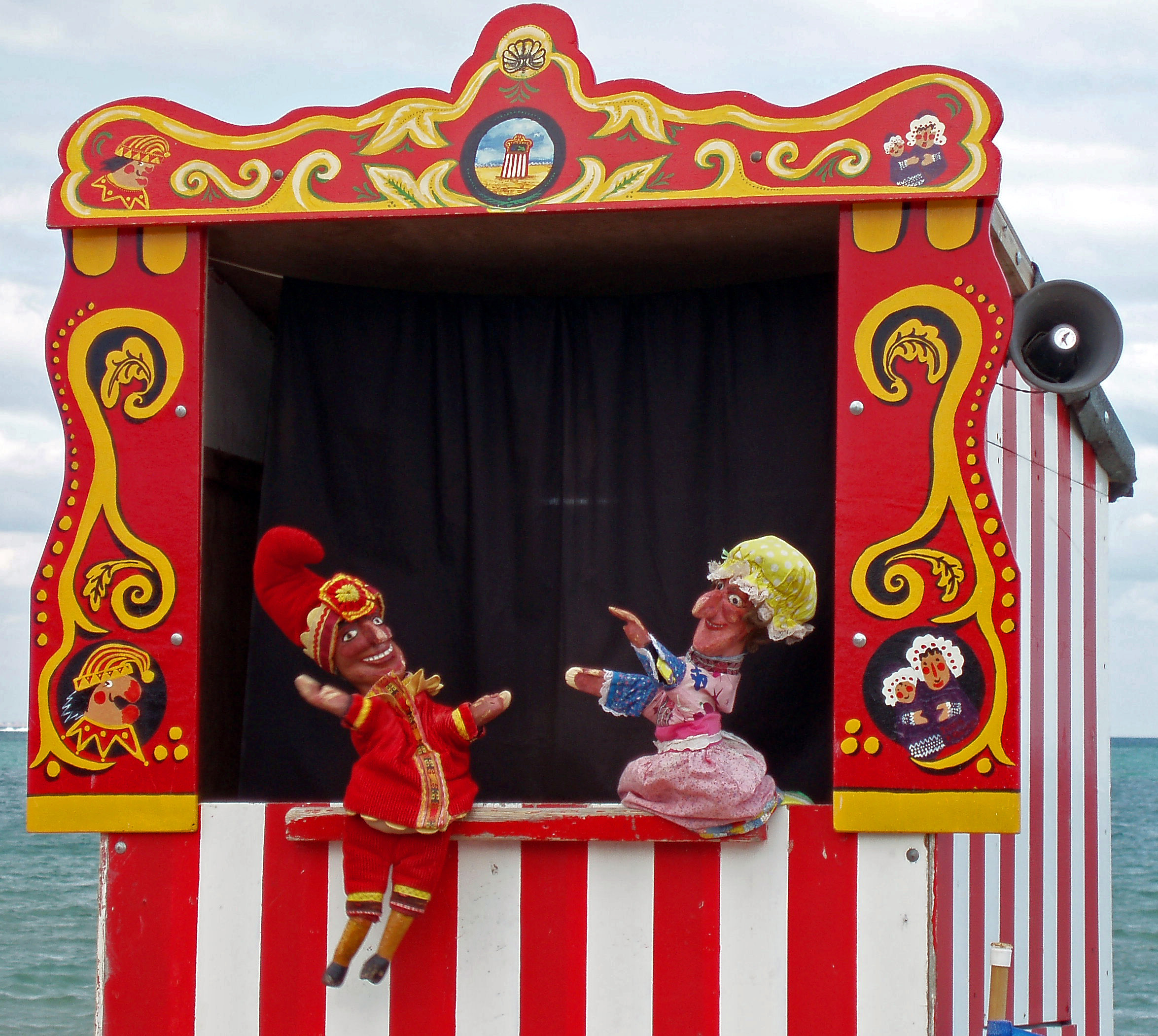
A traditional Punch and Judy booth, at Swanage, Dorset, England

The circus is a tradition form of entertainment in England. Chipperfield's Circus dates back more than 300 years in Britain, making it one of the oldest family circus dynasties. Philip Astley is regarded as the father of the modern circus. Following his invention of the circus ring in 1768, Astley's Amphitheatre opened in London in 1773. As an equestrian master Astley had a skill for trick horse-riding, and when he added tumblers, tightrope-walkers, jugglers, performing dogs, and a clown to fill time between his own demonstrations – the modern circus was born. The Hughes Royal Circus was popular in London in the 1780s. Pablo Fanque's Circus Royal, among the most popular circuses of Victorian England, showcased William Kite. Joseph Grimaldi, the most celebrated of clowns from England is considered the father of modern clowning.

Pantomime is a musical comedy stage production, designed for family entertainment. It is performed in theatres throughout England during the Christmas and New Year season. The art originated in the 18th century with John Weaver, a dance master and choreographer at the Theatre Royal, Drury Lane in London. Pantomime story lines and scripts are almost always based on traditional children's stories: some of the popular English stories featured include Jack and the Beanstalk, Peter Pan, Babes in the Wood, Goldilocks and the Three Bears and Dick Whittington and His Cat. In 19th century England it acquired its present form, which includes songs, slapstick comedy and dancing, employing gender-crossing actors, combining topical humour with a story loosely based on a well-known fairy tale. It is a participatory form of theatre, in which the audience sing along with parts of the music and shout out phrases to the performers, such as "It's behind you".

Music hall is a type of theatrical leisure popular from the early Victorian era to the mid-20th century. The precursor to variety shows of today, music hall involved a mixture of popular songs, comedy, speciality acts and variety entertainment. English performers who honed their skills at pantomime and music hall sketches include Charlie Chaplin, Stan Laurel, George Formby, Gracie Fields, Dan Leno, Gertrude Lawrence and Harry Champion. English music hall comedian and theatre impresario Fred Karno developed a form of sketch comedy without dialogue in the 1890s, and Chaplin and Laurel were among the music hall comedians who worked for him. A leading film producer stated; "Fred Karno is not only a genius, he is the man who originated slapstick comedy. We in Hollywood owe much to him."

The Notting Hill Carnival is an annual event that has taken place on the streets of Notting Hill, London since 1966. Led by the British African-Caribbean community, the carnival has attracted around one million people, making it Britain's biggest street festival and one of the largest in the world. Also of note is the extensive impact of Irish culture for St. Patrick's Day. The largest St Patrick's Day Parade takes place in Digbeth, Birmingham, where there is a strong Irish community.

== Cuisine ==
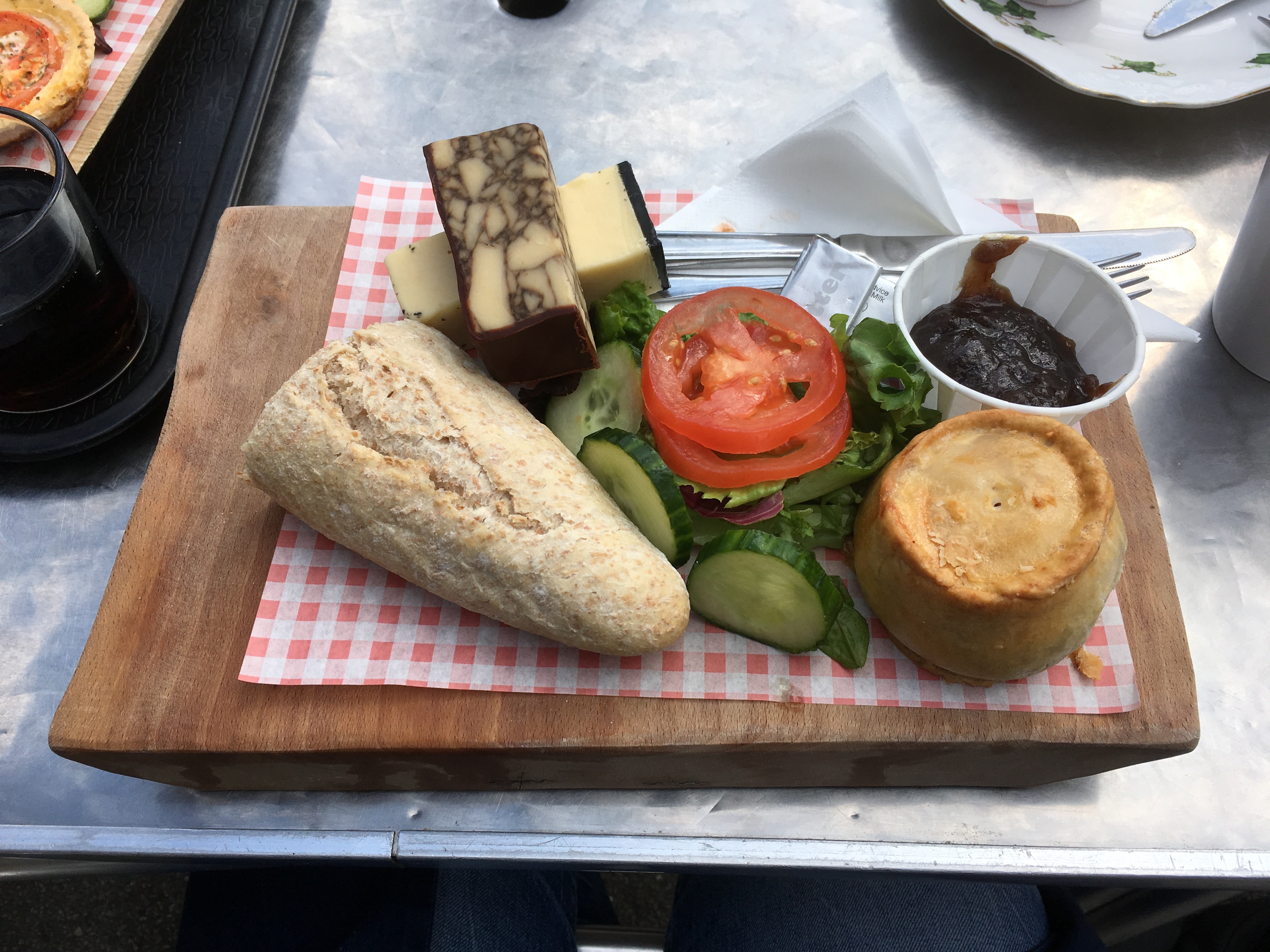
Ploughman's lunch with bread, cheese, salad, butter, a pork pie, and chutney

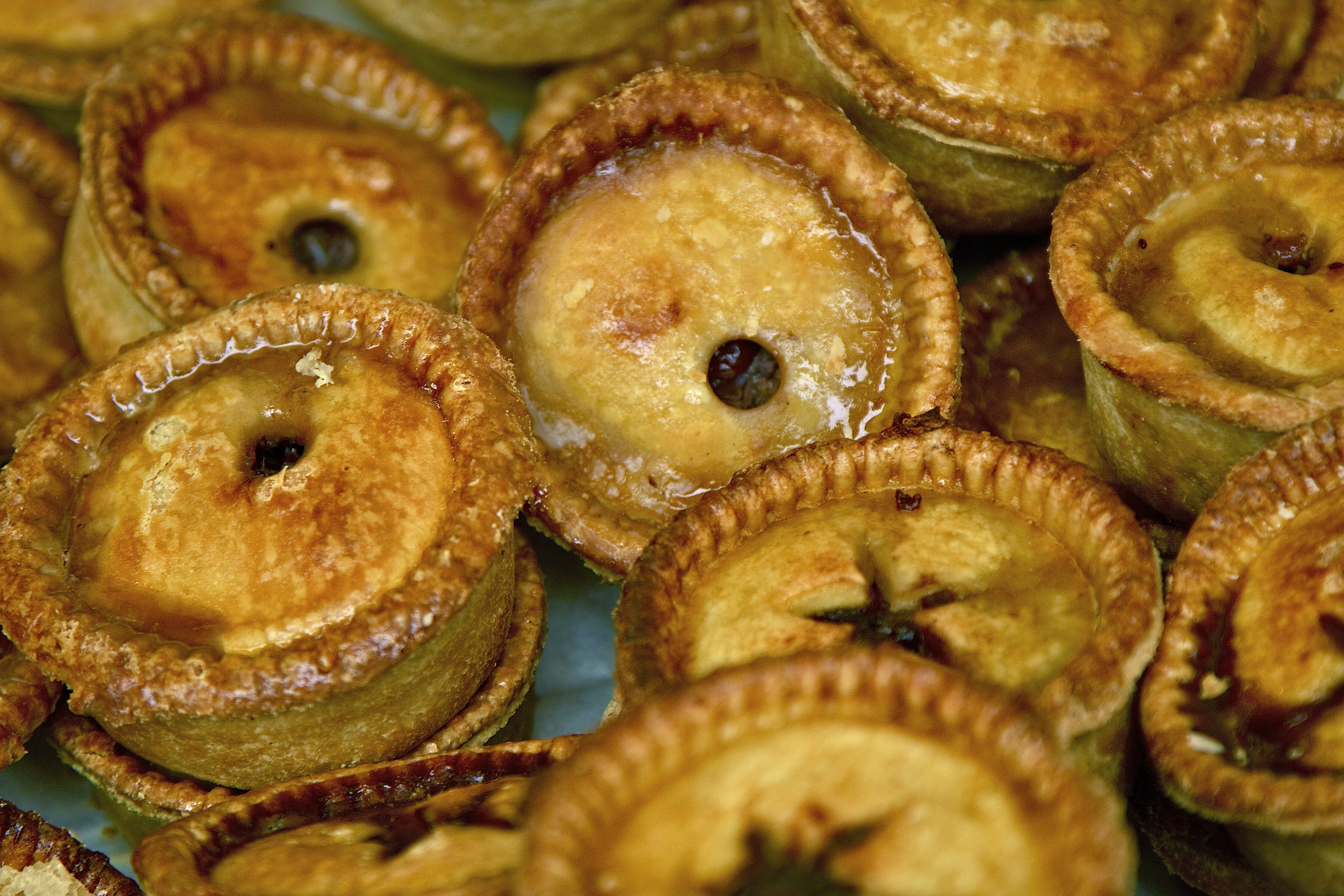
Pork pie

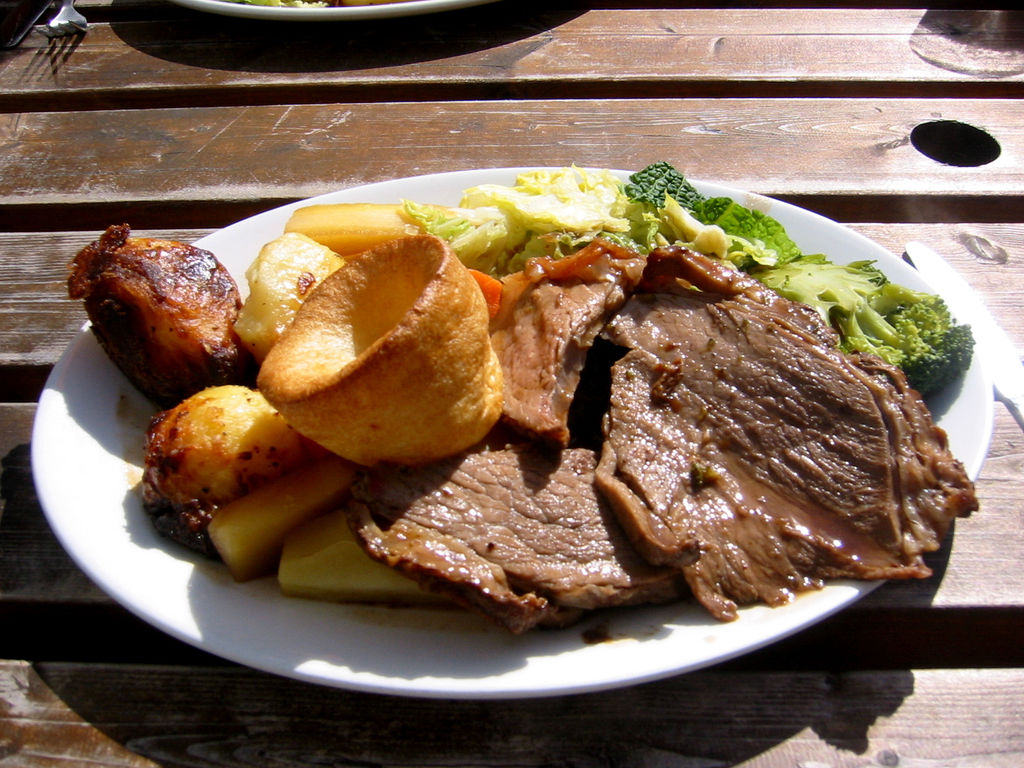
Sunday roast with roast beef and yorkshire pudding

Since the early modern period the food of England has historically been characterised by its simplicity of approach and a reliance on the high quality of natural produce. During the Middle Ages and through the Renaissance period, English cuisine enjoyed an excellent reputation, though a decline began during the Industrial Revolution with the move away from the land and increasing urbanisation of the populace. This has resulted in a traditional cuisine which tended to avoid strong flavours, such as garlic, and also complex sauces which were commonly associated with Roman Catholic Continental affiliations.

The cuisine of England has, however, recently undergone a revival, which has been recognised by food critics with some good ratings in Restaurant's best restaurant in the world charts. An early book of English recipes is the Forme of Cury from the royal court of Richard II. Traditional meals have ancient origins, such as bread, vegetables, cheese and onions, popular today as the Ploughman's lunch (usually accompanied by butter, pickles, chutney, ham, fresh green salad, boiled eggs, and apples), pottage and frumenty; roasted and stewed meats; meat and game pies; and freshwater and saltwater fish.

The last half century has seen significant changes in food manufacturing, retailing and consumption; an interest in different international cuisines; and the establishment of large restaurants, food outlets, coffee shops and supermarkets. However, distinctively English dishes, artisanal production, delicatessens, home cooking and traditional establishments such as pubs, cafes and tearooms remain widespread. The 1990s saw the rise of the gastropub, serving traditional English dishes, and farmers' markets, where English cheeses, breads, vegetables and other items are sold. Food culture in England has been taken more seriously since the 1960s due to writers and broadcasters such as Derek Cooper, Matthew Fort, Jonathan Meades and Nigel Slater.

Roast beef is a food traditionally associated with the English; the link was made famous by Henry Fielding's patriotic ballad "The Roast Beef of Old England", and William Hogarth's painting of the same name. Lamb is eaten especially at Easter. An English commentator wrote: "We have, throughout our history as a nation, had a weakness for meat in pastry which, while it is not unique, is a sort of hallmark of our taste." Pies appear in common English idioms such as "to eat humble pie", "as easy as pie", "a slice of the pie". Suet is an ingredient in many traditional English puddings, such as Norfolk Plough Pudding. Dumplings made with flour, suet and seasonings and pearl barley may be cooked with casseroles and stews. Potatoes are served roasted, boiled, baked, mashed, and as chips; popular varieties in England including King Edward, Jersey Royal, Charlotte potato, and Maris Piper.

Typical English main courses include lamb shank, pork and lamb chops chicken and chips, gammon, egg and chips, steak and kidney pie and other variants of steak pie, chicken and mushroom pie, bacon and egg pie, shepherd's pie, cottage pie, fish pie, Lancashire hotpot, scouse, Beef Wellington, steak and kidney pudding, stuffed marrow savoury bacon roll, boiled beef and carrots, rissoles, faggots, liver and bacon in onion gravy, Northumberland pan haggerty, sausage and mash, and toad in the hole. Butchers sell artisanal sausages, which are sometimes made from the meat of pedigree breeds such as Gloucester Old Spot pigs. English sausages generally contain about 70 per cent meat, bread rusk and seasonings. Cumberland, Lincolnshire, Newmarket and Oxford sausages are regional varieties. The best-known types of English ham are from Wiltshire and York. Game dealers sell venison and wild game, such as pheasant, partridge and grouse. Jugged rabbit and hare are traditional dishes.

A Sunday roast comprises roast meat served with gravy, roast potatoes and vegetables such as cauliflower, cabbage, carrots, parsnips, swede, spring greens, spinach, runner beans, broad beans, leeks and garden peas. Courgettes became widely available in the late 1960s and broccoli first appeared in supermarkets in the late 1970s, initially as a seasonal item. Meats served as part of a Sunday roast include beef, typically a fore rib of beef, with Yorkshire puddings and Horseradish sauce or English mustard; lamb, typically a leg, shoulder or saddle of lamb, with mint sauce or redcurrant jelly; pork, typically leg, shoulder or loin of pork, with crackling and apple sauce; honey-glazed gammon with cloves and parsley sauce; and poultry, such as chicken, duck (e.g. Aylesbury duck) and goose. Consumption of chicken increased from the 1950s when the introduction of poultry factories, pioneered in England by JB Eastwood Ltd. owned by John Bealby Eastwood, significantly reduced the price.

An English Christmas dinner traditionally consists of roast goose, duck, pheasant or (now most often) turkey, cranberry sauce, bread sauce, stuffing, gravy, pigs in blankets, roast potatoes, chestnuts, brussels sprouts and other vegetables. It is sometimes accompanied by cooked gammon and usually followed by Christmas pudding, traditionally made on stir-up Sunday, with rum or brandy butter, mince pies filled with mincemeat and Christmas cake. Biscuits in the form of gingerbread men are associated with Christmas, as are oranges, which are traditionally placed in Christmas stockings.

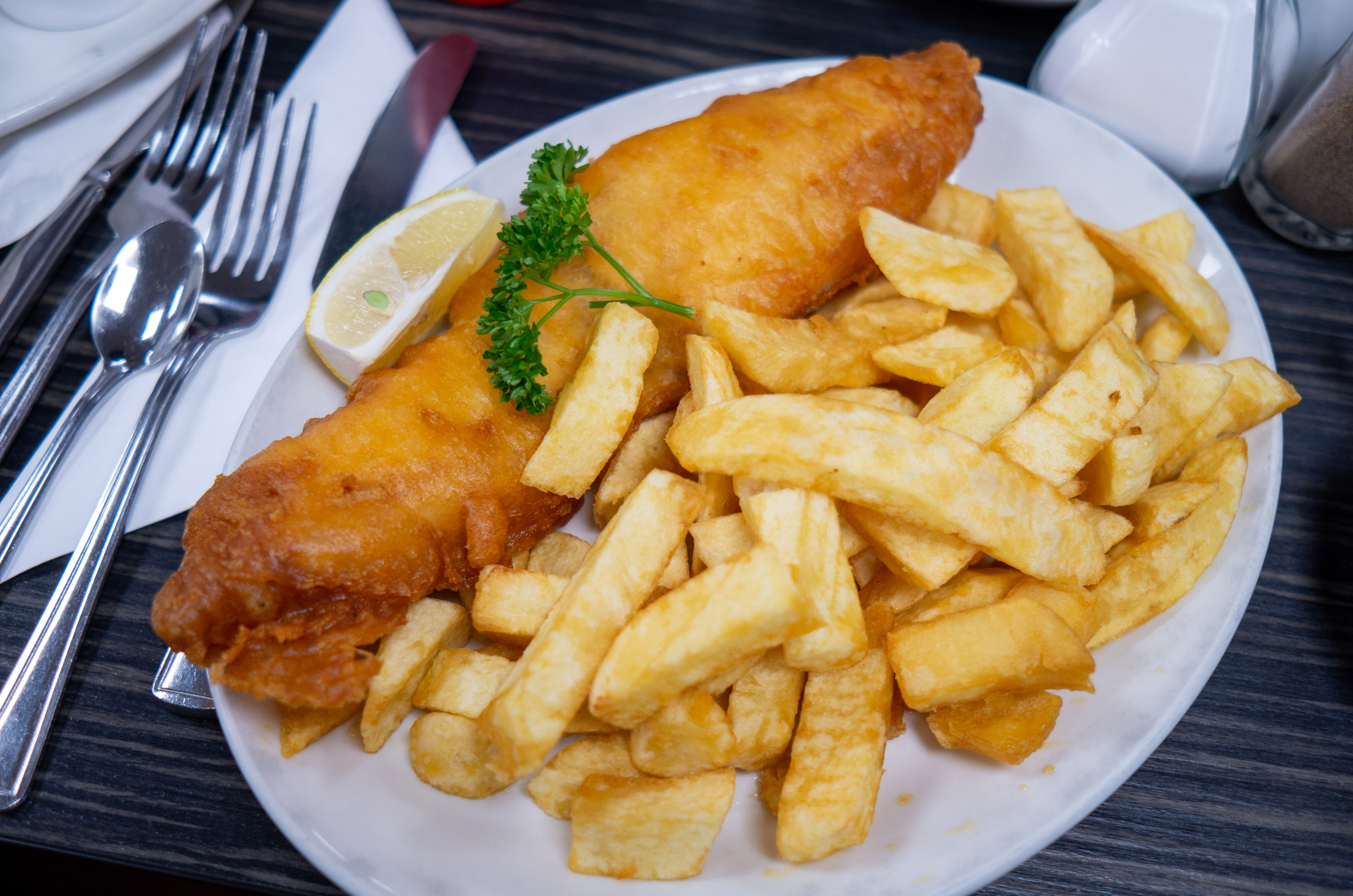
Fish and chips

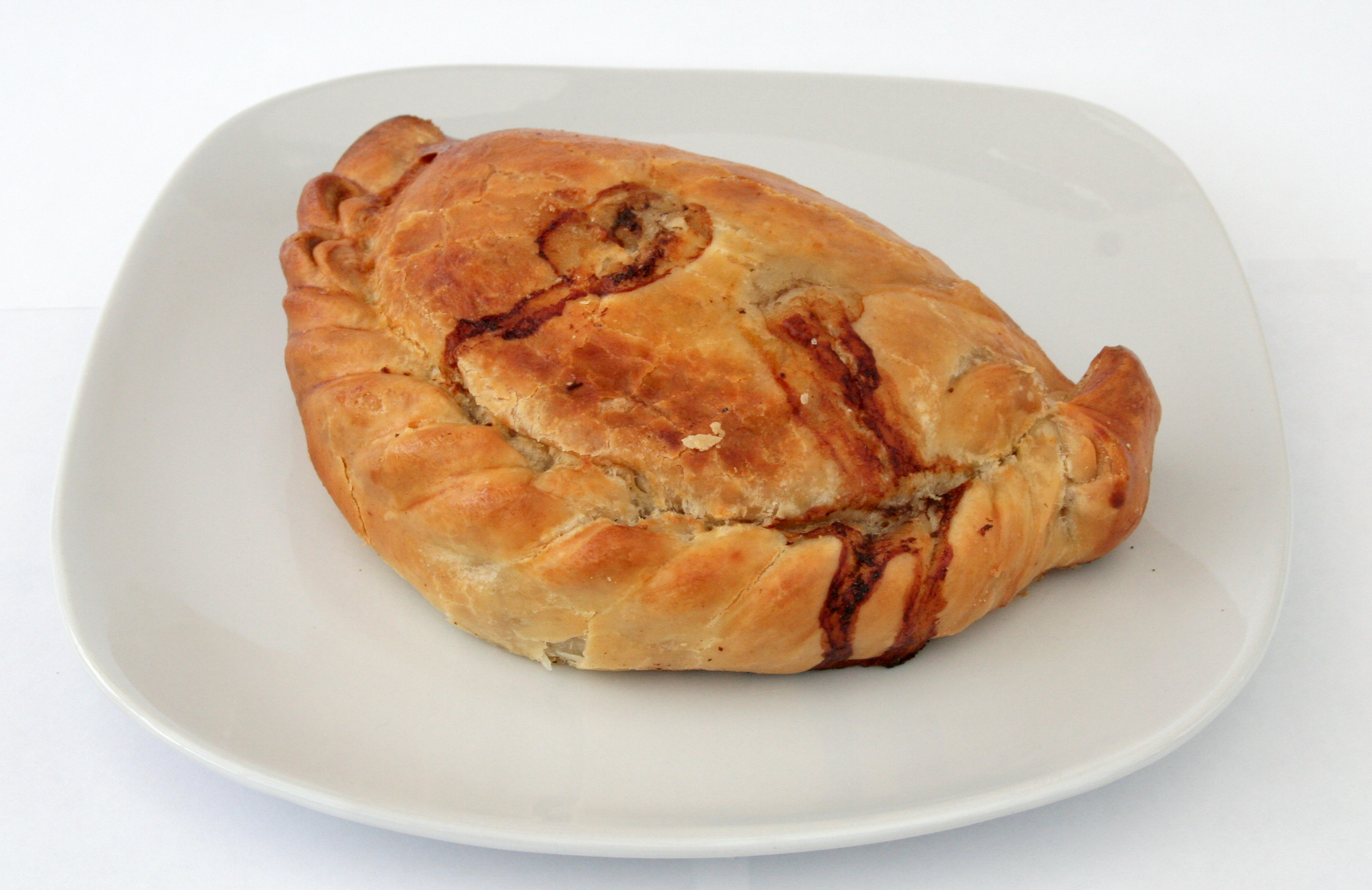
Cornish pasty

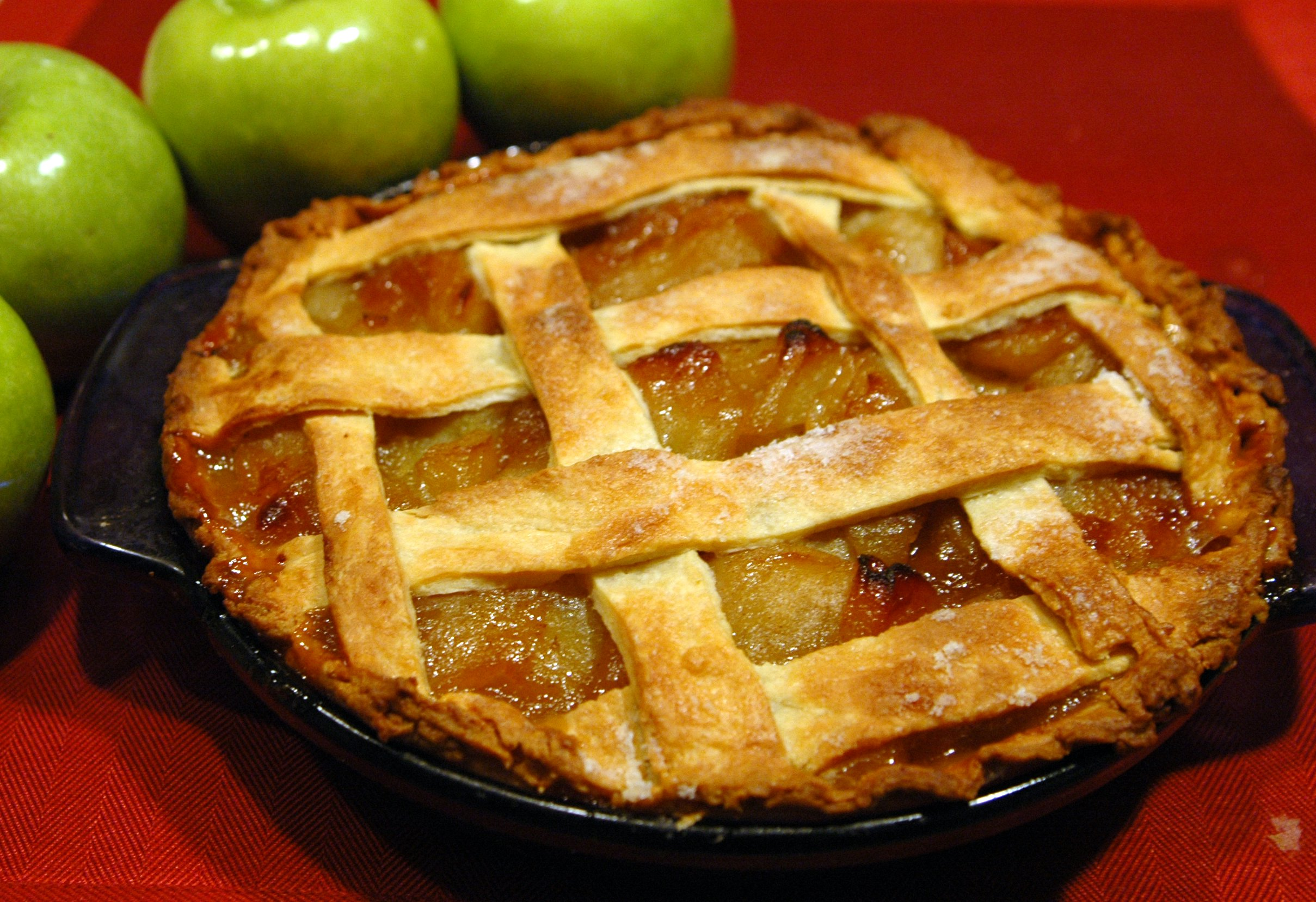
Apple pie originated in England and English apple pie recipes go back to the time of Chaucer.

The most popular types of fish in England, mainly imported through seaside and coastal towns, are salmon, cod, haddock, tuna and prawns. Fish and chips, sometimes served with mushy peas, are sold by fish and chip shops. Brixham in Devon has the highest value catch in England; other domestic fisheries include Cornwall and Hastings. Dover sole is so named because it could historically be sourced from the fishing port of Dover. Potted shrimps, prawn cocktail, whitebait, scallops and slices of smoked salmon, such as London Cure, are starters served with a squeeze of lemon and brown bread. Oysters are cultivated along the east coast of England, for example at Whitstable. Crabs are particularly associated with the Norfolk town of Cromer. Samphire is collected in coastal areas and served with fish.

Light meals and snacks include green salads served with salad cream, cauliflower cheese, macaroni cheese, Welsh rarebit, fishcakes, baked potatoes, cheese on toast, beans on toast, mushrooms on toast, spare ribs, Cornish pasties, Scotch eggs, sausage rolls, pork pies, gala pie and bacon sandwiches. The sandwich was named after the Earl of Sandwich and is very common as a lunchtime and picnic item with a wide range of fillings. Stotties, filled with ham and pease pudding, are eaten particularly in the north-east of England. Asparagus is served with butter alone or with other ingredients such as eggs and ham; the English asparagus season runs from late April to the end of June.

A poll in 2011 found that the most popular soups in England were tomato, leek and potato, chicken, carrot and coriander, mushroom, pea and ham (sometimes known as London Particular), and broccoli and stilton. Other traditional soups include vegetable, oxtail, cauliflower, artichoke, asparagus, spinach, parsnip, chestnut, watercress and chilled cucumber. Broth consists of meat and vegetables cooked in stock, sometimes thickened with barley or other cereals. Brown Windsor soup appeared in the 1953 Ealing film comedy The Captain's Paradise and, although opinion is divided as to whether and for how long it actually existed in real life, recipes for it can now be found. Worcestershire sauce and brown sauce, along with ketchup, are distinctive English condiments. Bovril and Marmite are food pastes with a distinctive flavour.

English desserts include (bramley) apple pie, cherry pie, bread and butter pudding, bread pudding, fruit crumble, fruit cobbler, Eve's pudding, Dorset apple cake, baked apple, gooseberry fool, sticky toffee pudding, treacle tart, treacle sponge pudding (made with golden syrup), jam roly-poly, spotted dick, bakewell tart, trifle, rice pudding, eton mess, cheesecake Sussex pond pudding, summer pudding, Cabinet pudding, English custard tart and, since the 1970s, lemon meringue pie and banoffee pie. Hot puddings are often served with custard. Some puddings, such as jelly, blancmange and chocolate sponge with chocolate custard, are associated with school dinners. Fruit salad is a mixture of fresh fruit and canned fruits such as peaches and apricots served in syrup. Fruits grown in England include apples, pears, plums, cherries, damsons, blackberries, black currants, gooseberries, raspberries, strawberries (often served with cream) and rhubarb. Ice creams are sometimes sold from ice cream vans which use distinctive chimes to attract customers

The Full English breakfast, also referred to as 'bacon and eggs' or a 'fry up', typically comprises a choice from rashers of back bacon, fried or scrambled eggs, pork sausages, black pudding, grilled tomatoes, mushrooms, baked beans, fried bread, hash browns (which largely displaced bubble and squeak in the 1970s), and sometimes white pudding; usually served with toast and jam, marmalade or honey, and a cup of coffee or tea Alternative breakfast dishes include boiled eggs with toast soldiers, smoked salmon and scrambled eggs, poached eggs on toast, and Craster kippers. Porridge has long been eaten in England as a breakfast cereal. Fruit juice and yogurt are more recent additions.

=== Afternoon tea ===
Traditionally, High Tea would be had as a full evening meal, whereas Afternoon Tea was a lighter meal taken earlier in the afternoon only by the upper and middle classes of society, the idea being popularized by Anna Russell, Duchess of Bedford in the 1840s. A cream tea includes a pot of tea and scones (or buns called splits) served with jam and clotted cream from Devon or Cornwall, sometimes accompanied by dainty finger sandwiches, with fillings such as cucumber and smoked salmon.

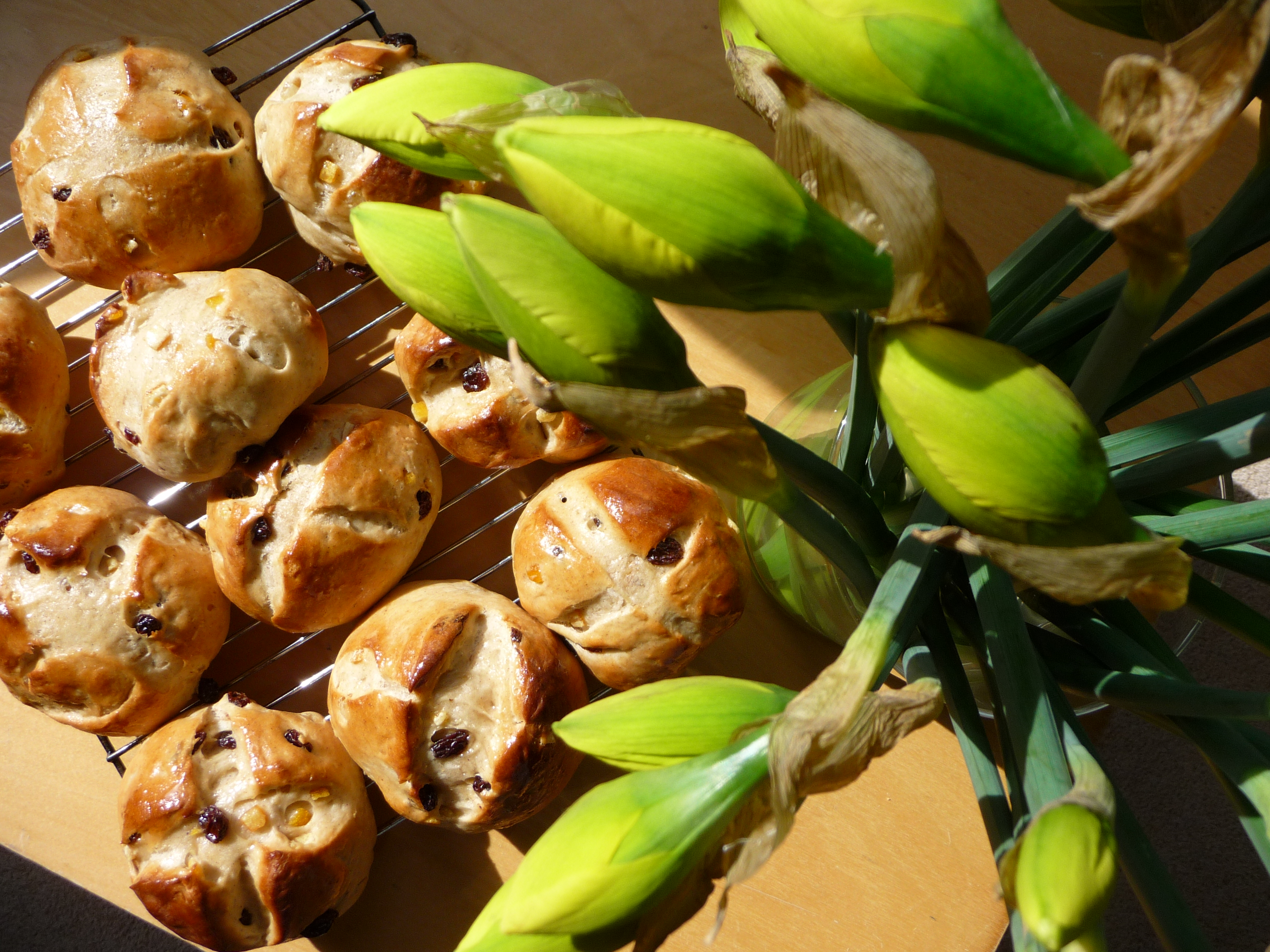
Hot cross buns are traditionally eaten on Good Friday.

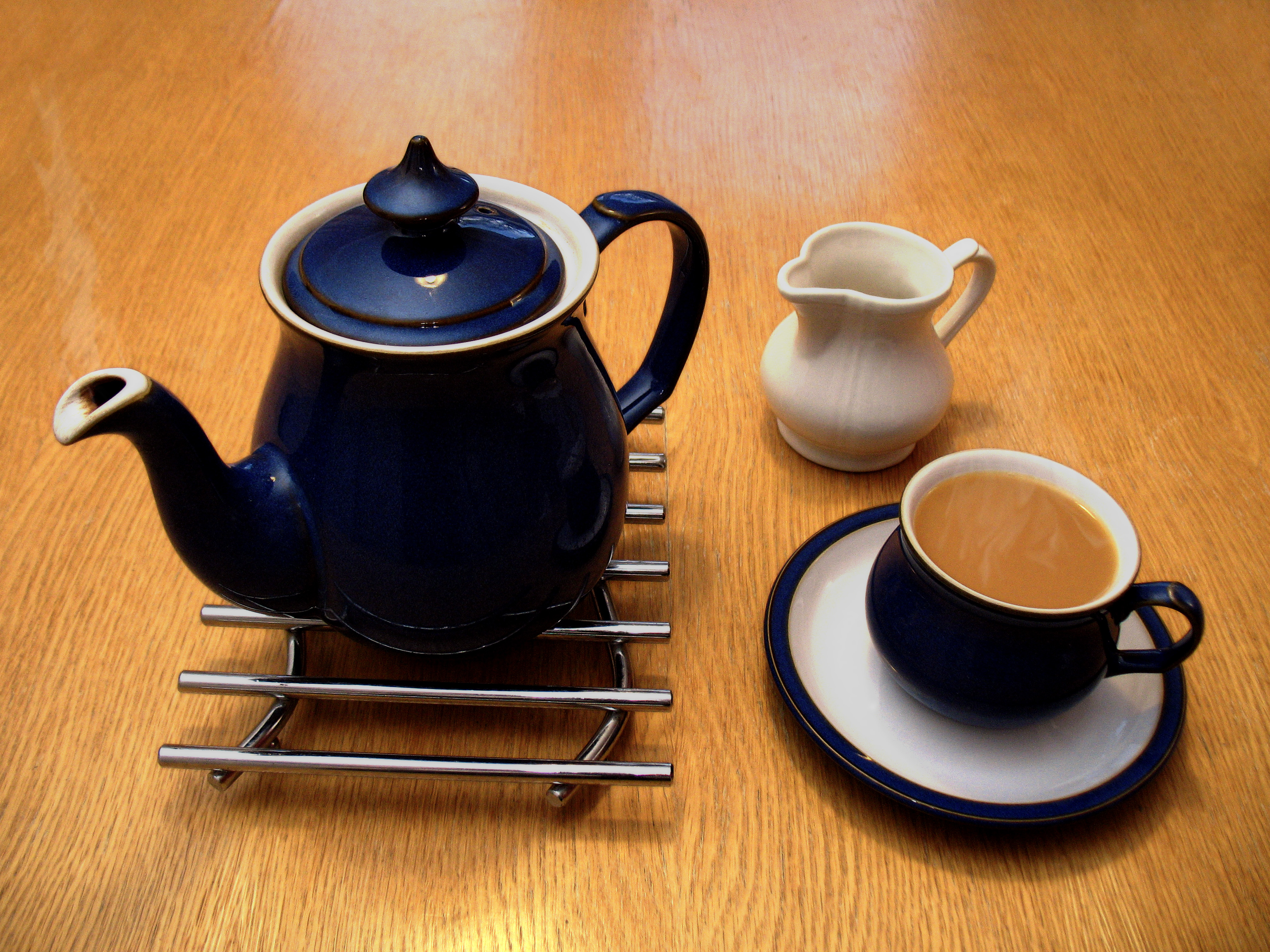
Tea

English cakes include a variety of fruit cakes, such as Genoa cake, and sponge cakes, such as Victoria sponge, Madeira cake, Battenberg cake, chocolate sponge, coffee cake, lemon drizzle cake, fairy cakes and Queen cakes. Wartime rationing popularised carrot cake. Simnel cake is a special fruit cake associated with Mothering Sunday and Easter. The traditional wedding cake is made from a rich fruitcake. Parkin and toffee apples are eaten on Guy Fawkes Night. Particular types of gingerbread are associated with Grasmere, Market Drayton and Cornwall. Eccles cakes and Banbury cakes are small round cakes filled with currants. Other items served for afternoon tea include teacakes, crumpets and pikelets, English muffins, Cornish saffron cake and buns, tea loaf, malt loaf, seed cake, rock cakes, flapjacks, jam tarts, maids of honour tarts, doughnuts and lardy cakes. Lemon curd or honey is another traditional English treat. Cheese scones are made using grated cheese with a strong flavour such as Cheddar or Red Leicester. They may be served at afternoon tea as an alternative to jam, cake, small pastries and fruit tarts. Teas are typically served in tearooms and hotels.

There are several types of fruited bun such as currant buns, Chelsea buns, Bath buns and hot cross buns (the latter marking Good Friday). English Pancakes are served on Shrove Tuesday.

Types of English loaves, generally leavened bread made using white and/or wholemeal bread flour milled from hard wheat, include farmhouse, cottage, bloomer cob, Coburg, crusty, plait, tin, and sandwich. Since the 1960s much commercially produced bread has used the Chorleywood bread process, but from the 1990s there has been growing interest in artisanal and home baking as well as sourdough bread. Bread rolls are most commonly round in shape and may be crusty or soft.

=== Cheese and other dairy products ===
Consumption of dairy products in England has varied over time. Historically farms turned surplus milk into cheese and households made simple cream cheese and cottage cheese. The coming of the railways meant fresh milk could be transported quickly to the cities. Until the 1990s milk was generally delivered to customers in reusable glass milk bottles to the door by a milkman driving an electric milk float, but by 2018 supermarket sales of different kinds of milk in plastic cartons and of cream accounted for over 95% of the market. Yellow sweetcream (rather than lactic) butter is most common in England, in both salted and unsalted varieties. Commercial standardisation in the late 19th century led to a fairly large number of regional cheeses, including:

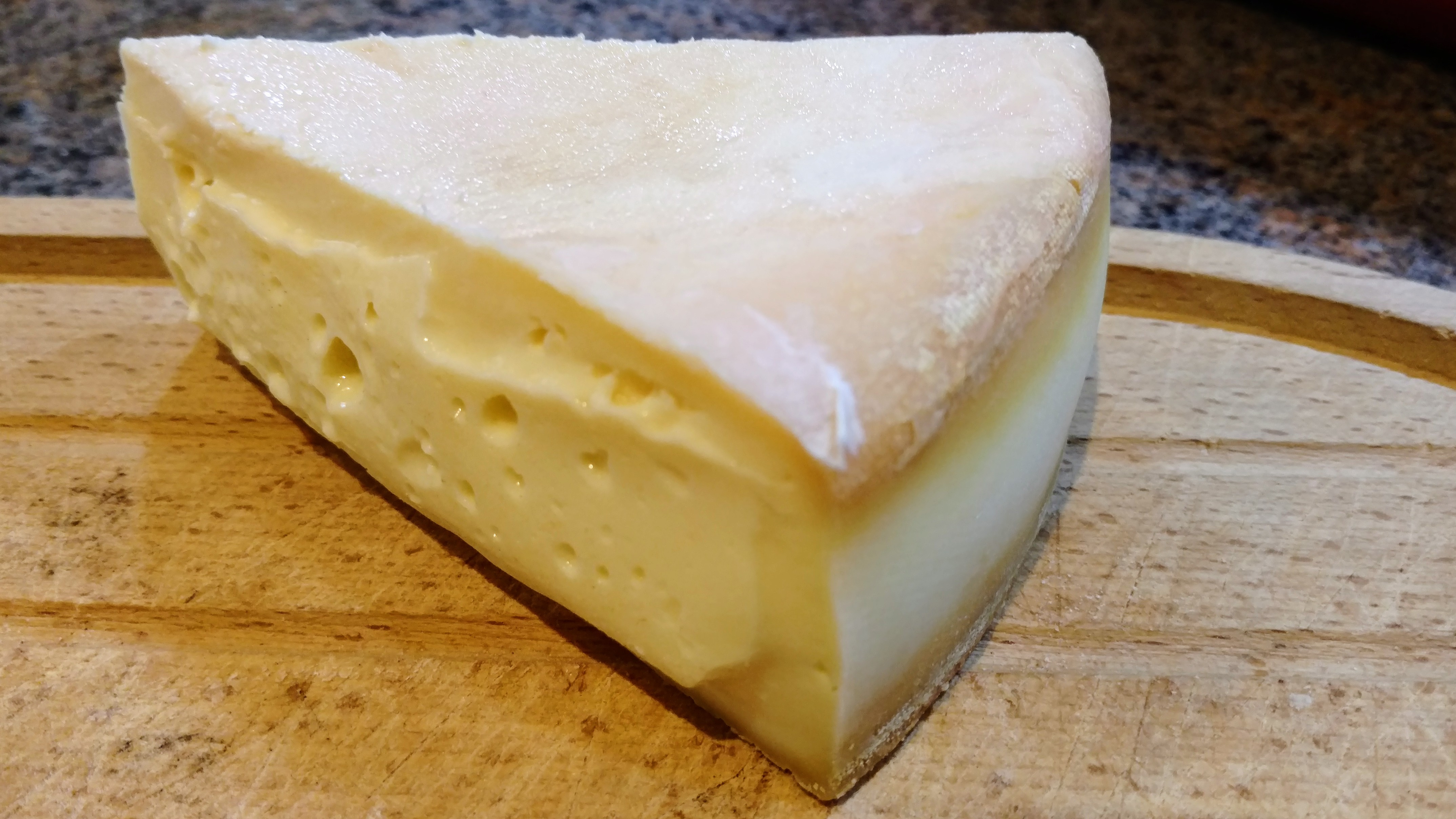
Stinking Bishop cheese

- Cheddar cheese
- Cheshire cheese
- Stilton cheese
- Wensleydale cheese
- Lancashire cheese
- Double Gloucester cheese
- Red Leicester cheese
- Shropshire Blue cheese
- Dorset Blue Vinney cheese
- Swaledale cheese
- Sage Derby cheese

English cheesemaking was restricted by wartime rationing and the number of dairy farms has diminished considerably since the abolition of the Milk Marketing Board in 1994, but many of the remaining producers sell added-value products such as artisanal cheese and farmhouse ice cream and there are now over 750 different cheeses. Recent decades have seen English replicas of French cheeses, such as Brie, Camembert and chèvre. A number of British cheeses were accepted as having EU protected geographical status. Homegrown artisanal cheeses are made by both long-established and new producers. These include hard cheeses such as Lincolnshire Poacher, and semi-soft or soft cheeses, such as Stinking Bishop, Cornish Yarg and Oxford Blue.

=== Drinks ===
Tea and beer are typical and rather iconic drinks in England. Beer is used metaphorically to refer to pleasure, as in cakes and ale and beer and skittles. Most tea drunk in England is black tea. The types of single origin tea most commonly sold are Assam and Darjeeling from India, Ceylon (Sri Lanka) and Lapsang Souchong from China. English breakfast tea is a strong blend that goes well with milk and sugar. Earl Grey tea is flavoured with bergamot. A cup of tea is often accompanied with a biscuit or piece of cake.

Whilst tea drinking and tearooms have diminished since the rise of instant coffee consumption in the 1970s and global chains of coffee shops in the 1990s, there has been a rapid growth in the number of breweries since the early 1970s. This was driven initially by a renewed interest in cask ale, stimulated by the Campaign for Real Ale and its Good Beer Guide, and more recently by the global influence of, particularly American, craft brewing.

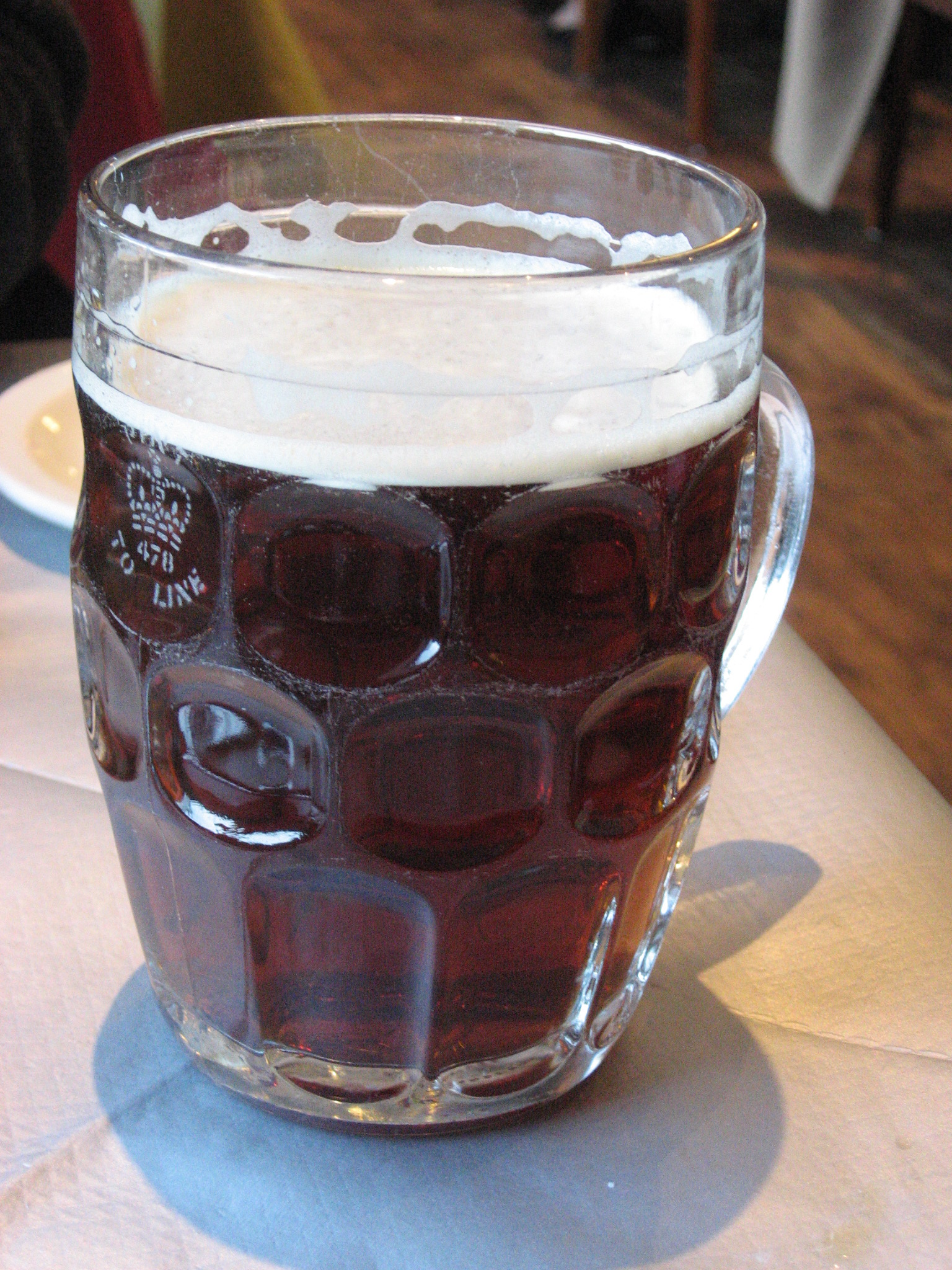
A pint of real ale

Traditional English beer, unlike lager, is made with warm/top-fermenting yeasts and encompasses bitter and pale ale, other (less hoppy) types of ale, porter and stout. Pale ale, when served draught, gained the name of bitter amongst drinkers in the first half of the 19th century because it was more hopped than other ales of the time such as mild, but is generally much less hopped than modern American pale ale. India pale ale was exported to India but also consumed in England. Pale ale has long been sold in bottled form and Burton Pale Ale enjoyed particular popularity. Light ale is a low-alcohol bitter, often bottled. More recently the terms golden ale and amber ale have been used to differentiate between pale ales of different shades. Other types of ale include strong Burton Ale, old ale, barley wine, mild ale, and brown ale.

Bitter became the predominant English beer style in the 1950s, largely supplanting mild ale and Burton ale, and has accordingly been described as "the national drink of England". Research in 2014 found that although "beer fans divide equally between ale and lager drinkers … classic bitter is still the favourite for ale drinkers". Cobra Beer is an Indian-style lager that was created in 1989 to be drunk with food, which is now brewed in Burton upon Trent and sold in almost all Indian restaurants. Cider and perry is produced in the West Country. Scrumpy refers to rough dry farmhouse cider. Shandy is beer mixed with a non-alcoholic drink, such as lemonade. Ginger beer is a usually sold as a non-alcoholic, carbonated drink flavoured with ginger, but is sometimes brewed (fermented).

Magna Carta stated there should be a single measure for ale. In pubs beer and cider are served draught by the pint or half-pint, either in a straight glass or a dimpled glass tankard (known as a jug), and may be drunk with snack food (e.g. crisps, dry roasted or salted peanuts, and pork scratchings) or a meal However, the number of pubs fell by around a third between the early 1970s and 2017 and since 2014 more beer has been sold in bottles by supermarkets and off licences (off-trade) than in pubs (on-trade). Marston's Brewery and Greene King are the two largest brewers of premium cask and bottled beers, having grown by acquisition. Shepherd Neame Brewery is the largest family-owned brewery.

Gin has been popular in England since the late 17th century and is mixed with tonic water, ice and a slice of lemon. Pimm's No. 1 Cup, a gin-based drink containing a mixture of herbs and liquors, is used to make punch for summer social events. The rise of micro-distilleries in England at the start of the 21st century led to an upsurge in interest in both gin and vodka. The south of England has seen the reintroduction of vineyards making English wine. Lemon barley water, invented by Matthias Archibald Robinson in 1823, is made by pouring pearl barley water over the rind and/or pulp of a lemon and adding sugar to taste. The Wimbledon tennis championships are associated with this drink.

== Folklore ==
English folklore developed over many centuries. Some of the characters and stories are present all over England, but most belong to specific regions. Common folkloric beings include pixies, giants, elves, trolls, goblins and dwarves. While many legends and folk-customs are thought to be ancient, for instance the tales featuring Offa of Angel and Wayland the Smith, others date from after the Norman conquest of England: Robin Hood and his Merry Men of Sherwood and their battles with the Sheriff of Nottingham are perhaps the best known.

During the High Middle Ages tales originated from Brythonic traditions, notably the Arthurian legend. Deriving from Welsh sources; King Arthur, Excalibur and Merlin, while the Jersey poet Wace introduced the Knights of the Round Table. These stories are most centrally brought together within Geoffrey of Monmouth's Historia Regum Britanniae. Another early figure from British tradition, King Cole, may have been based on a real figure from Sub-Roman Britain. Many of the tales and pseudo-histories make up part of the wider Matter of Britain, a collection of shared British folklore.

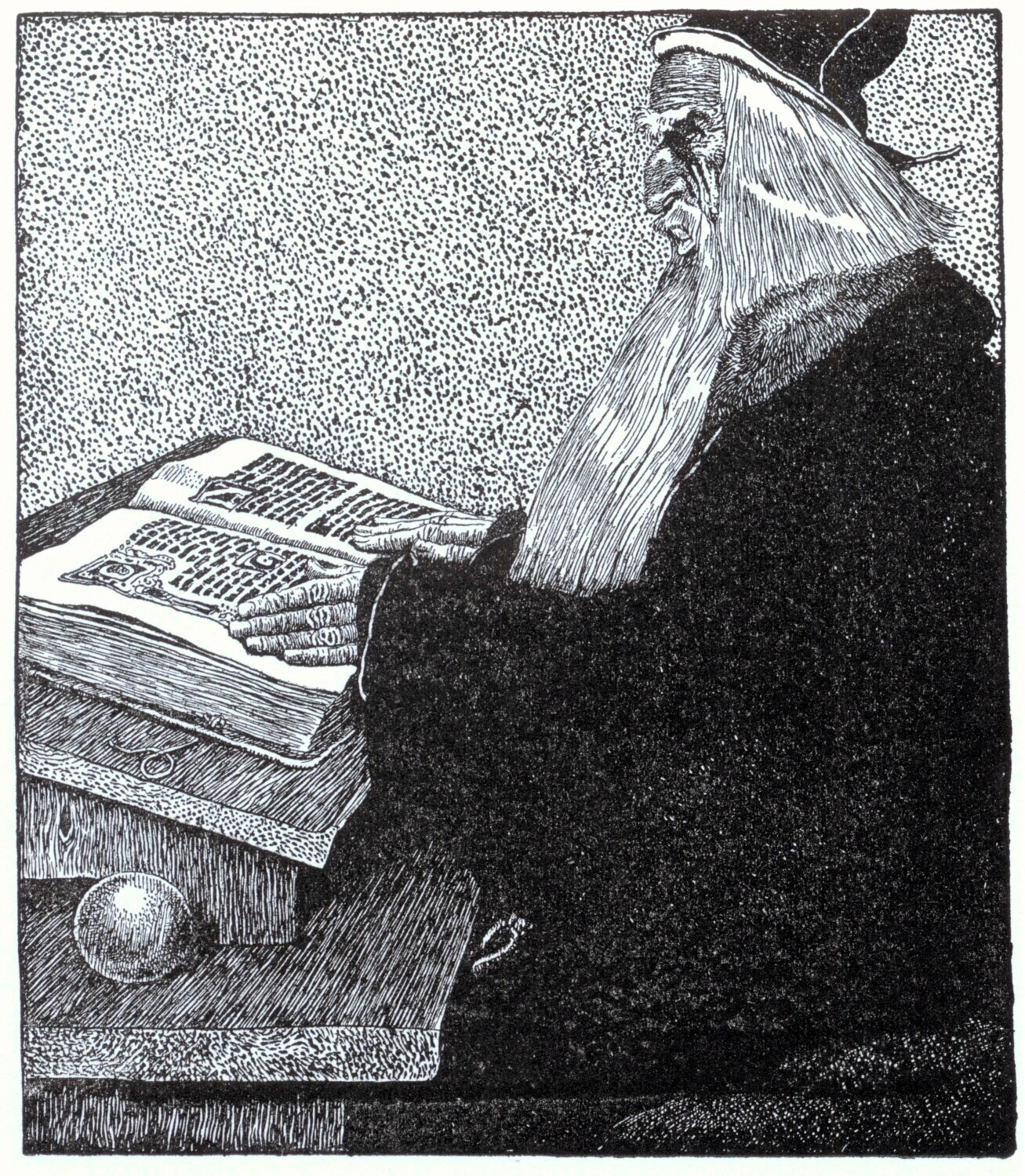
The wizard Merlin features as a character in many works of fiction, including the BBC series Merlin.

English fairy tale Goldilocks and the Three Bears is one of the most popular fairy tales in the English language. Some folk figures are based on semi-historical or historical people whose stories have been passed down the centuries; Lady Godiva for instance was said to have ridden naked on horseback through Coventry, Hereward the Wake was a heroic English figure resisting the Norman invasion, Herne the Hunter is an equestrian ghost associated with Windsor Forest and Great Park (whose tale bears the common European folkloric motif of the Wild Hunt) and Mother Shipton is the archetypal witch. The chivalrous bandit, such as Dick Turpin, is a recurring character. There are various still surviving national and regional folk activities, such as Morris dancing, Maypole dancing, Rapper sword in the North East, Long Sword dance in Yorkshire, Mummers Plays, bottle-kicking in Leicestershire, and cheese-rolling at Cooper's Hill. There is no official national costume, but a few costumes are well established, such as the Pearly Kings and Queens associated with cockneys, the Royal Guard, the Morris costume and Beefeaters. The utopian vision of a traditional England is sometimes referred to as Merry England.

Published in 1724, A General History of the Pyrates by Captain Charles Johnson provided the standard account of the lives of many pirates in the Golden Age of Piracy. Many famous English pirates from the Golden Age hailed from the West Country in the south west coast of England—the stereotypical West Country "pirate accent" was popularised by West Country native Robert Newton's portrayal of Long John Silver in film. The concept of "walking the plank" was popularised by J. M. Barrie's novel, Peter Pan, where Captain Hook's pirates helped define the archetype. Davy Jones' Locker where sailors or ship's remains are consigned to the bottom of the sea is first recorded by Daniel Defoe in 1726. Johnson's 1724 book gave a mythical status to famous English pirates such as Blackbeard and Samuel Bellamy.

The Gremlin is part of Royal Air force folklore dating from the 1920s, with gremlin being RAF slang for a mischievous creature that sabotages aircraft, meddling in the plane's equipment. Legendary figures from 19th century London whose tales have been romanticised include Sweeney Todd, the murderous barber of Fleet Street, and serial killer Jack the Ripper. On 5 November, people in England make bonfires, set off fireworks and eat toffee apples in commemoration of the foiling of Guy Fawkes' Gunpowder Plot, which became an annual event after Observance of 5th November Act 1605 was passed. Guy Fawkes mask is an emblem for anti-establishment protest groups.

Witchcraft has featured in England for millennia. The use of a crystal ball to foretell the future is attributed to the druids. In medieval folklore King Arthur's magician, the wizard Merlin, carried around a crystal ball for the same purpose. John Dee, consultant to Elizabeth I, frequently used a crystal ball to communicate with the angels. Probably the most famous depiction of witchcraft in literature is in Shakespeare's 1606 play Macbeth, featuring the three witches and their cauldron. The ghost of Anne Boleyn is a frequently reported ghost sighting in the UK. Differing accounts include seeing her ghost ride up to Blickling Hall in a coach drawn by a headless horseman, with her own head on her lap.

== The English language ==
Countries where English is natively spoken or has official status

The English language originated in England and is the native language of the English people. It is a member of the West Germanic language family. The modern English language evolved from Middle English (the form of language in use by the English people from the 12th to the 15th century); Middle English was influenced lexically by Norman-French, Old French and Latin. In the Middle English period Latin was the language of administration and the nobility spoke Norman French. Middle English was itself derived from the Old English of the Anglo-Saxon period; in the Northern and Eastern parts of England the language of Danish settlers had influenced the language, a fact still evident in Northern English dialects.

There were once many different dialects of modern English in England, which were recorded in projects such as the English Dialect Dictionary (late 19th century) and the Survey of English Dialects (mid 20th century), but many of these have passed out of common usage as Standard English has become more widespread through education, the media and socio-economic pressures. Received Pronunciation is considered the most prestigious accent in England. Despite the country's relatively small size, there are many distinct regional accents, and individuals with particularly strong accents may not be easily understood everywhere in the country.

Cornish, a Celtic language, is one of three existing Brythonic languages; its usage has been revived in Cornwall. Historically, another Brythonic Celtic language, Cumbric, was spoken in Cumbria in North West England. Early Modern English began in the late 15th century with the introduction of the printing press to London and the Great Vowel Shift. Through the worldwide influence of the British Empire, English spread around the world from the 17th to mid-20th centuries. Through newspapers, books, the telegraph, the telephone, phonograph records, radio, satellite television, broadcasters (such as the BBC) and the Internet, as well as the emergence of the United States as a global superpower, Modern English has become the international language of business, science, communication, sports, aviation, and diplomacy.

In schools, language teaching is compulsory from the age of seven. French, German, and Spanish are commonly taught in all schools. Arabic, Bengali, Mandarin, Greek, Gujarati, Modern Hebrew, Italian, Japanese, Punjabi, Persian, Polish, Portuguese, Russian, Turkish, and Urdu are also taught.

=== Surnames ===
Rank	Surname	Origin	Percentage
1	Smith	England	1.44
2	Jones	Wales	0.75
3	Taylor	England	0.59
4	Brown	England	0.56
5	Williams	Wales	0.39
6	Wilson	England	0.39
7	Johnson	England	0.37
8	Davis	Wales	0.34
9	Robinson	England	0.32
10	Wright	England	0.32
11	Thompson	England	0.31
12	Evans	Wales	0.30
13	Walker	England	0.30
14	White	England	0.30
15	Roberts	Wales	0.28
16	Green	England	0.28
17	Hall	England	0.28
18	Woods	England and Scotland	0.27
19	Jackson	England, Scotland and Ireland	0.27
20	Clarke	England and Ireland	0.26

== The law ==
English law is the legal system of England and Wales. Due to the British Empire, it has been exported across the world: it is the basis of common law jurisprudence. The 18th century English jurist, judge and politician Sir William Blackstone is best known for his seminal work, Commentaries on the Laws of England, containing his formulation: "It is better that ten guilty persons escape than that one innocent suffer", a principle that government and the courts must err on the side of innocence, which has remained constant. Sir William Garrow ushered in the adversarial court system in common law. He coined the phrase "presumed innocent until proven guilty", insisting that defendants' accusers and their evidence be thoroughly tested in court.

Major constitutional documents include: Magna Carta (foundation of the "great writ" Habeas corpus—safeguarding individual freedom against arbitrary state action), the Bill of Rights 1689 (one provision granting freedom of speech in Parliament), Petition of Right, Habeas Corpus Act 1679 and Parliament Acts 1911 and 1949. The jurist Albert Venn Dicey wrote that the British Habeas Corpus Acts "declare no principle and define no rights, but they are for practical purposes worth a hundred constitutional articles guaranteeing individual liberty". A strong advocate of the "unwritten constitution", Dicey stated English rights were embedded in English common law, and "the institutions and manners of the nation".

== Religion ==
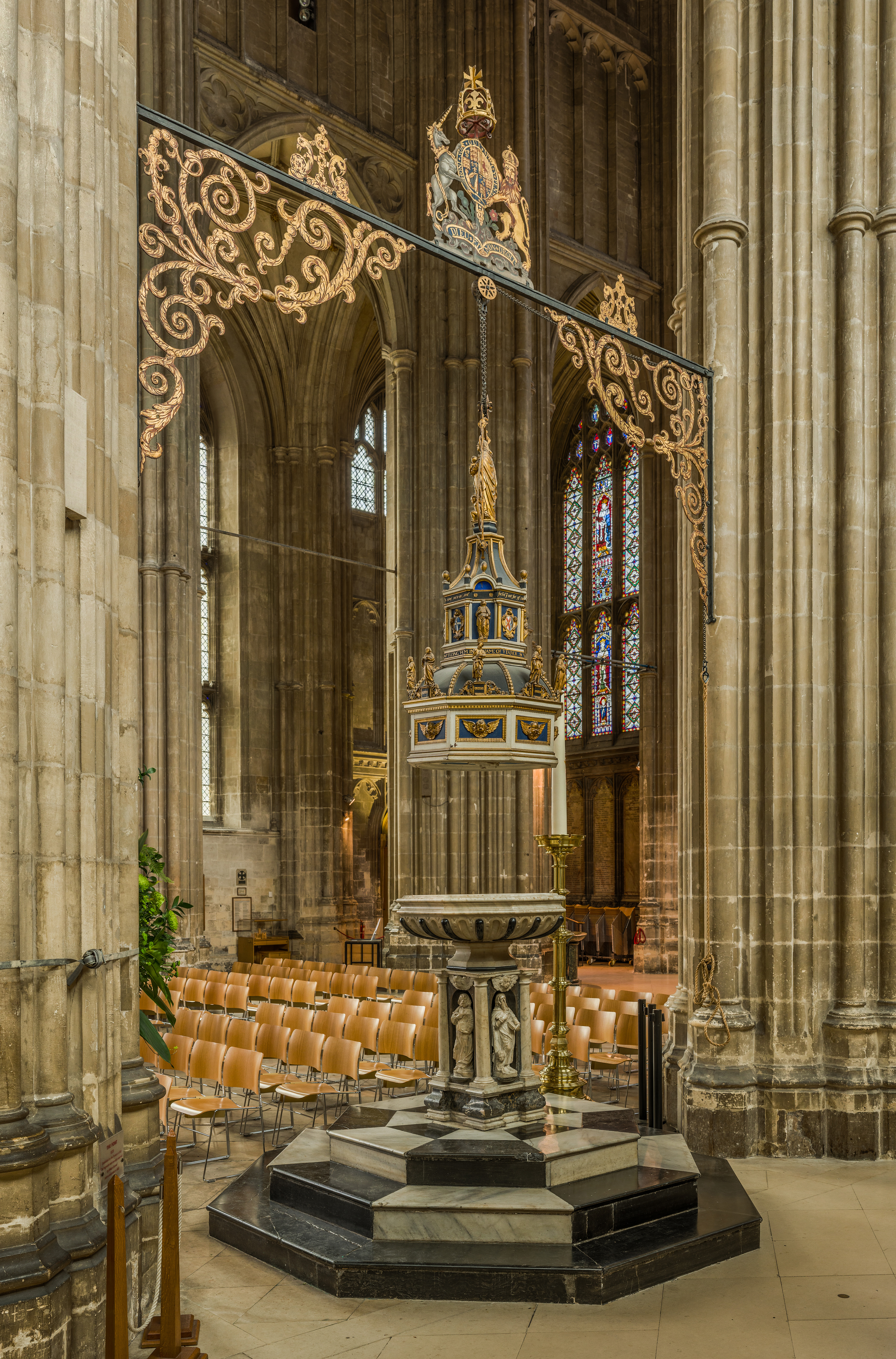
Canterbury Cathedral is the seat of the Primate of All England, the Archbishop of Canterbury, the most senior bishop of the Church of England. (It was the property of the Roman Catholic Church before the English Reformation.)

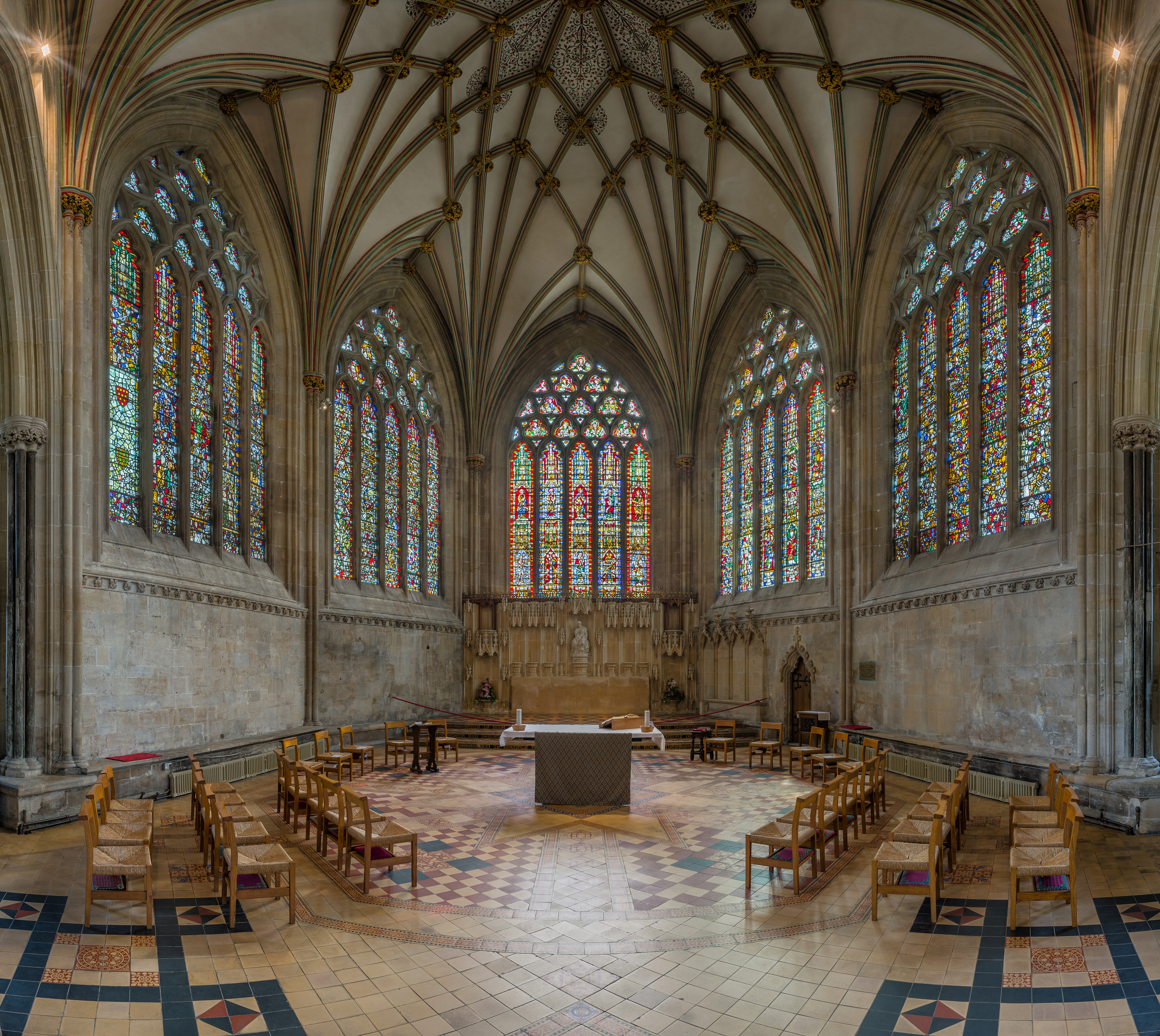
The Lady Chapel of Wells Cathedral

Christianity became the dominant religion in England in the 7th century. Polytheistic Indo-European religions, often referred to as paganism, were practised before Christianity took hold. The most notable of these religions were Celtic polytheism, Roman polytheism and Anglo-Saxon paganism, which was the religion of the early English people, or Anglo-Saxons, and which was in many ways very similar to the closely related Norse paganism practised by the Scandinavian peoples and that would later be introduced to England by the Danes.

Christianity was first established in Britain by the Roman Empire. According to legend, Christianity was introduced to Britain by Joseph of Arimathea, who came to Glastonbury. There is also a tradition ascribing this accomplishment to Lucius of Britain. Archaeological evidence for Christian communities begins to appear in the 3rd and 4th centuries. The Romano-British population after the withdrawal of the Roman legions remained mostly Christian. The Anglo-Saxon invaders and settlers who replaced them, founding the English nation, represented a stark return to pre-Christian religion for Britain. From the arrival of the Anglo-Saxons beginning in the 4th century until the arrival of the Augustinian Mission in 597 AD, England was entirely pagan, and the pre-Christian Germanic religion was practised openly in pockets throughout the country for many decades after this.

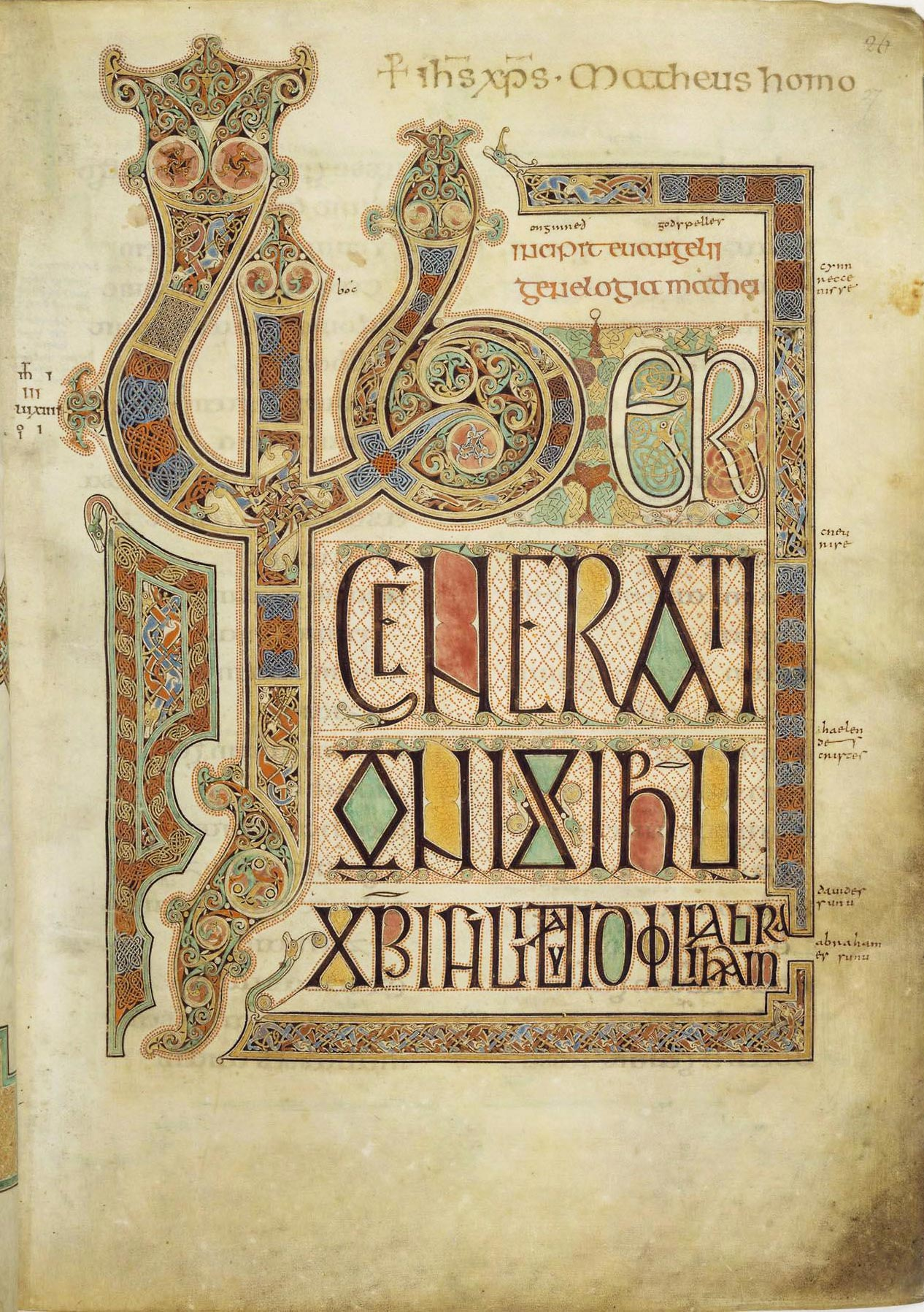
The Lindisfarne Gospels

Christianity was reintroduced into England by missionaries from Scotland and from Continental Europe: the era of Augustine of Canterbury, the first Archbishop of Canterbury, and the Celtic Christian missionaries in the north (notably Aidan of Lindisfarne and Cuthbert who came from Scotland) began in 597 AD. Early English Christian documents from this time include the 7th-century illuminated Lindisfarne Gospels and the historical accounts written by Bede. The Durham Gospels is a Gospel book produced at Lindisfarne.

In 1536, the Church of England split from Rome over the issue of the divorce (technically, the marriage annulment) of King Henry VIII from Catherine of Aragon. The split led to the emergence of a separate ecclesiastical authority. Later the influence of the Reformation resulted in the Church of England adopting its distinctive reformed Catholic position known as Anglicanism which maintains episcopacy while adopting a Lutheran theology. For more detail of this period see the following article: Timeline of the English Reformation.

Today, the Church of England is the established church in England. It regards itself as in continuity with the pre-Reformation state Catholic church (something the Roman Catholic Church does not accept) and has been a distinct Anglican church since the settlement under Elizabeth I (with some disruption during the 17th-century Commonwealth of England period). The British Monarch is formally Supreme Governor of the Church of England. Its spiritual leader is the Archbishop of Canterbury, who is regarded by convention as the head of the worldwide Anglican Communion. In practice the Church of England is governed by the General Synod of the Church of England, under the authority of Parliament. The Church of England's mission to spread the Gospel has seen the establishment of many churches in the Anglican Communion throughout the world particularly in the Commonwealth of Nations.

A strong tradition of Methodism developed from the 18th century onward. The Methodist revival was started in England by a group of men including John Wesley and his younger brother Charles Wesley as a movement within the Church of England; it developed as a separate denomination after John Wesley's death. Other non-conformist Protestant traditions were also established in England. Saint George is recognised as the patron saint of England. Before Edward III, Edmund the Martyr was recognised as England's patron saint, and the flag of England consists of the Saint George's Cross. However, Saint Alban is venerated by some as England's first Christian martyr.

Change ringing is the traditional method of bell ringing in English churches, co-ordinated by the Central Council of Church Bell Ringers and promoted by societies such as the Ancient Society of College Youths and the Society of Royal Cumberland Youths. Change ringing is central to The Nine Tailors by Dorothy L. Sayers, voted the best crime novel of the 1930s by the British Crime Writers' Association.

=== Celebration of Christmas ===
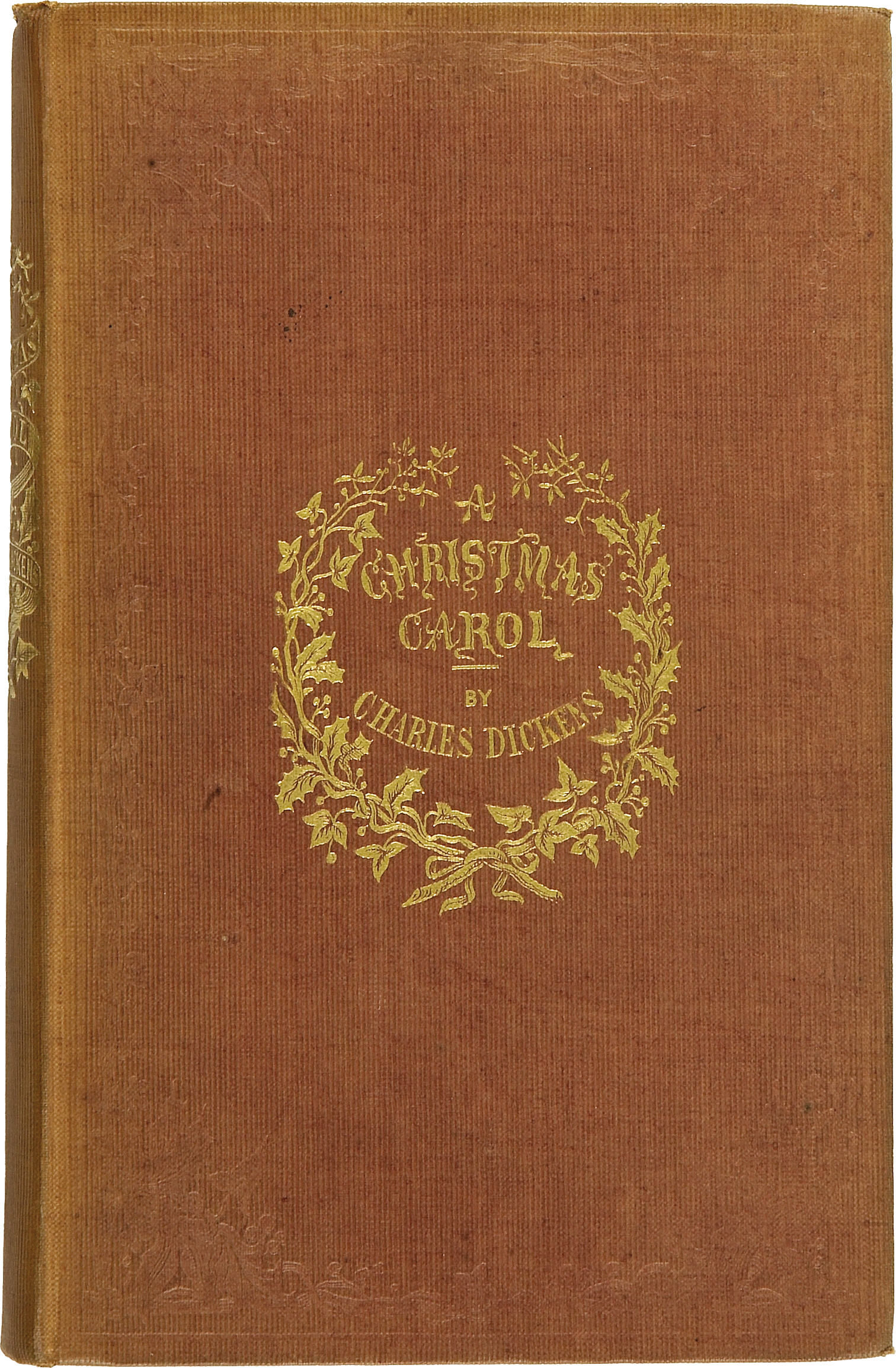
Charles Dickens' 1843 novella A Christmas Carol played a major role in reviving the "spirit" of Christmas and seasonal goodwill.

In 17th-century England, the Puritans condemned the celebration of Christmas. In contrast, the Anglican Church "pressed for a more elaborate observance of feasts, penitential seasons, and saints' days. The calendar reform became a major point of tension between the Anglicans and Puritans." The Catholic Church also responded, promoting the festival in a more religiously oriented form. King Charles I of England directed his noblemen and gentry to return to their landed estates in midwinter to keep up their old-style Christmas generosity. Following the Parliamentarian victory over Charles I during the English Civil War, Puritan rulers banned Christmas in 1647.

Protests followed as pro-Christmas rioting broke out in several cities and for weeks Canterbury was controlled by the rioters, who decorated doorways with holly and shouted royalist slogans. The book, The Vindication of Christmas (London, 1652), argued against the Puritans, and makes note of Old English Christmas traditions, dinner, roast apples on the fire, card playing, dances with "plow-boys" and "maidservants", old Father Christmas and carol singing. The Restoration of King Charles II in 1660 ended the ban. Following the Restoration, Poor Robin's Almanack contained the lines: "Now thanks to God for Charles return, / Whose absence made old Christmas mourn. / For then we scarcely did it know, / Whether it Christmas were or no."

In the early 19th century, writers imagined Tudor Christmas as a time of heartfelt celebration. In 1843, Charles Dickens wrote the novel A Christmas Carol that helped revive the "spirit" of Christmas and seasonal merriment. Dickens sought to construct Christmas as a family-centred festival of generosity, in contrast to the community-based and church-centred observations, the observance of which had dwindled during the late 18th century and early 19th century. Dickens influenced many aspects of Christmas that are celebrated today in Western culture, such as family gatherings, seasonal food and drink, dancing, games, and a festive generosity of spirit. A prominent phrase from the tale, "Merry Christmas", was popularized following the appearance of the story. The term Scrooge became a synonym for miser, with "Bah! Humbug!" dismissive of the festive spirit.

The revival of the Christmas Carol began with William Sandys's Christmas Carols Ancient and Modern (1833), with the first appearance in print of "The First Noel", "I Saw Three Ships", "Hark the Herald Angels Sing" and "God Rest Ye Merry, Gentlemen". In 1843 the first commercial Christmas card was produced by Henry Cole leading to the exchange of festive greeting cards among the public.

== Science and technology ==
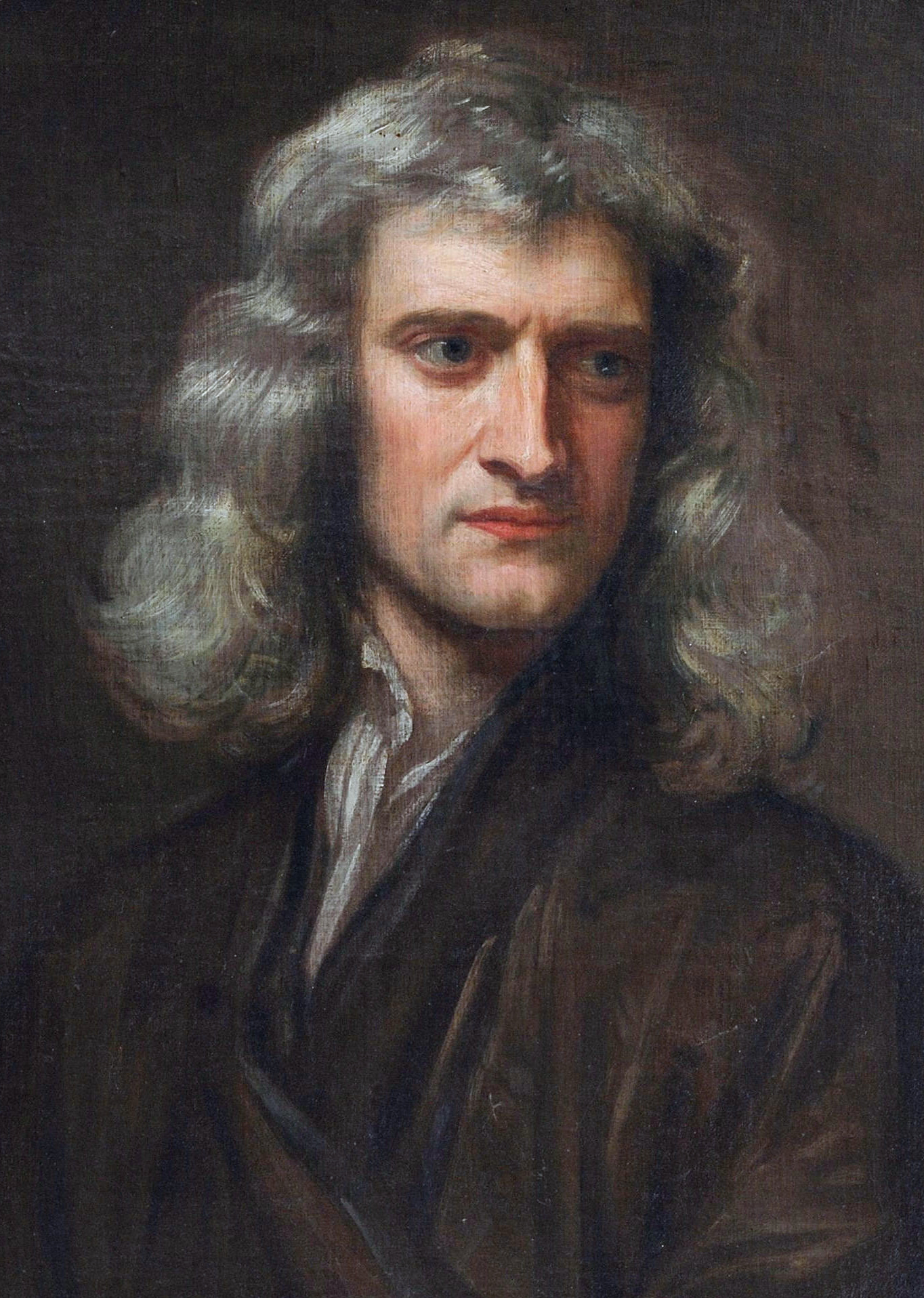
Sir Isaac Newton is regarded as one of the most influential scientists of all time and as a key figure in the Scientific Revolution.

The English have played a significant role in the development of science and engineering. Prominent English figures from the field of science and mathematics include Isaac Newton, Michael Faraday, Charles Darwin, Robert Hooke, James Prescott Joule, John Dalton, Lord Rayleigh, J. J. Thomson, James Chadwick, Charles Babbage, George Boole, Alan Turing, Tim Berners-Lee, Paul Dirac, Stephen Hawking, Peter Higgs, Roger Penrose, John Horton Conway, Thomas Bayes, Arthur Cayley, G. H. Hardy, Oliver Heaviside, Andrew Wiles, Edward Jenner, Francis Crick, Joseph Lister, Joseph Priestley, Thomas Young, Christopher Wren and Richard Dawkins. Some experts claim that the earliest concept of a metric system was invented by John Wilkins, the first secretary of the Royal Society, in 1668.

England has been a leading centre of the Scientific Revolution since the 17th century. As the birthplace of the Industrial Revolution, England was home to many significant inventors during the late 18th and early 19th centuries. Famous English engineers include Isambard Kingdom Brunel, best known for the creation of the Great Western Railway, a series of famous steamships, and numerous important bridges, hence revolutionising public transport and modern-day engineering. Thomas Newcomen's steam engine helped spawn the Industrial Revolution. It is home to the Royal Institution, the Royal Society, the Greenwich Observatory and its associated meridian.

The Father of Railways, George Stephenson, built the first public inter-city railway line in the world, the Liverpool and Manchester Railway, which opened in 1830. With his role in the marketing and manufacturing of the steam engine, and invention of modern coinage, Matthew Boulton (business partner of James Watt) is regarded as one of the most influential entrepreneurs in history. The physician Edward Jenner's smallpox vaccine is said to have "saved more lives ... than were lost in all the wars of mankind since the beginning of recorded history."

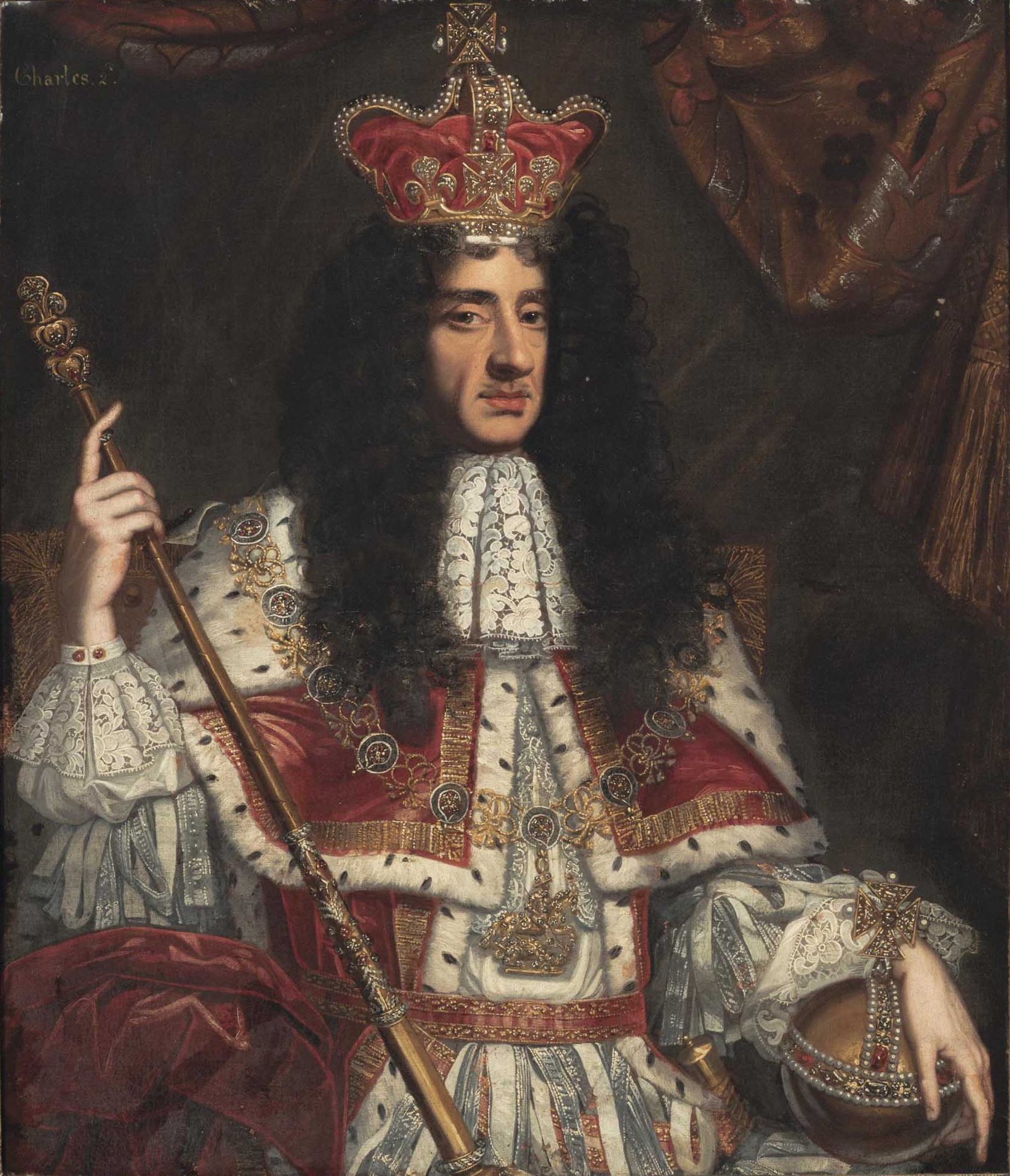
King Charles II, a patron of the arts and sciences, supported the Royal Society, a scientific group whose early members included Robert Hooke, Robert Boyle and Sir Isaac Newton.

Inventions and discoveries of the English include: the jet engine, the first industrial spinning machine, the first computer and the first modern computer, the World Wide Web along with HTML, the first successful human blood transfusion, the motorised vacuum cleaner, the lawn mower, the seat belt, the hovercraft, the electric motor, steam engines, and theories such as the Darwinian theory of evolution and atomic theory. Newton developed the ideas of universal gravitation, Newtonian mechanics, and calculus, and Robert Hooke his eponymously named law of elasticity. Other inventions include the iron plate railway, the thermosiphon, tarmac, the rubber band, the mousetrap, "cat's eye", road marker, joint development of the light bulb, steam locomotives, the modern seed drill and many modern techniques and technologies used in precision engineering.

The Royal Society, formally The Royal Society of London for Improving Natural Knowledge, is a learned society and the United Kingdom's national academy of sciences. Founded on 28 November 1660, it was granted a royal charter by King Charles II as "The Royal Society". It is the oldest national scientific institution in the world. The society fulfils a number of roles: promoting science and its benefits, recognising excellence in science, supporting outstanding science, providing scientific advice for policy, fostering international and global co-operation, education and public engagement.

The Royal Institution of Great Britain was founded in 1799 by leading English scientists, including Henry Cavendish and its first president, George Finch. Its foundational principles were diffusing the knowledge of, and facilitating the general introduction of useful mechanical inventions and improvements, as well as enhancing the application of science to the common purposes of life (including through teaching, courses of philosophical lectures, and experiments).

=== Industrial Revolution ===
The Industrial Revolution began in England due to the social, economic and political changes implemented in the previous centuries. Whereas absolute monarchy stayed the normal form of power execution through most parts of Europe, institutions ensured property rights and political safety to English people after the Glorious Revolution of 1688. Aided by these legal and cultural foundations, an entrepreneurial spirit and consumer revolution drove industrialisation in Britain. Under the newly formed Kingdom of Great Britain, output from the Royal Society and other English initiatives combined with the Scottish Enlightenment created excessive innovations in science and engineering. Domestically it drove the Industrial Revolution, resulting in industrialised agriculture, manufacture, engineering and mining, as well as new and pioneering road, rail and water networks to facilitate their expansion and development. The opening of Northwest England's Bridgewater Canal in 1761 ushered in the canal age in Britain. In 1825 the world's first permanent steam locomotive-hauled passenger railway – the Stockton and Darlington Railway – opened to the public.

Geographical and natural resource advantages of Great Britain also contributed, with the country's extensive coastlines and many navigable rivers in an age when water was the easiest means of transportation along with its high quality coal. According to British historian Jeremy Black, "an unprecedented explosion of new ideas, and new technological inventions, transformed our use of energy, creating an increasingly industrial and urbanised country. Roads, railways and canals were built. Great cities appeared. Scores of factories and mills sprang up. Our landscape would never be the same again. It was a revolution that transformed not only the country, but the world itself."

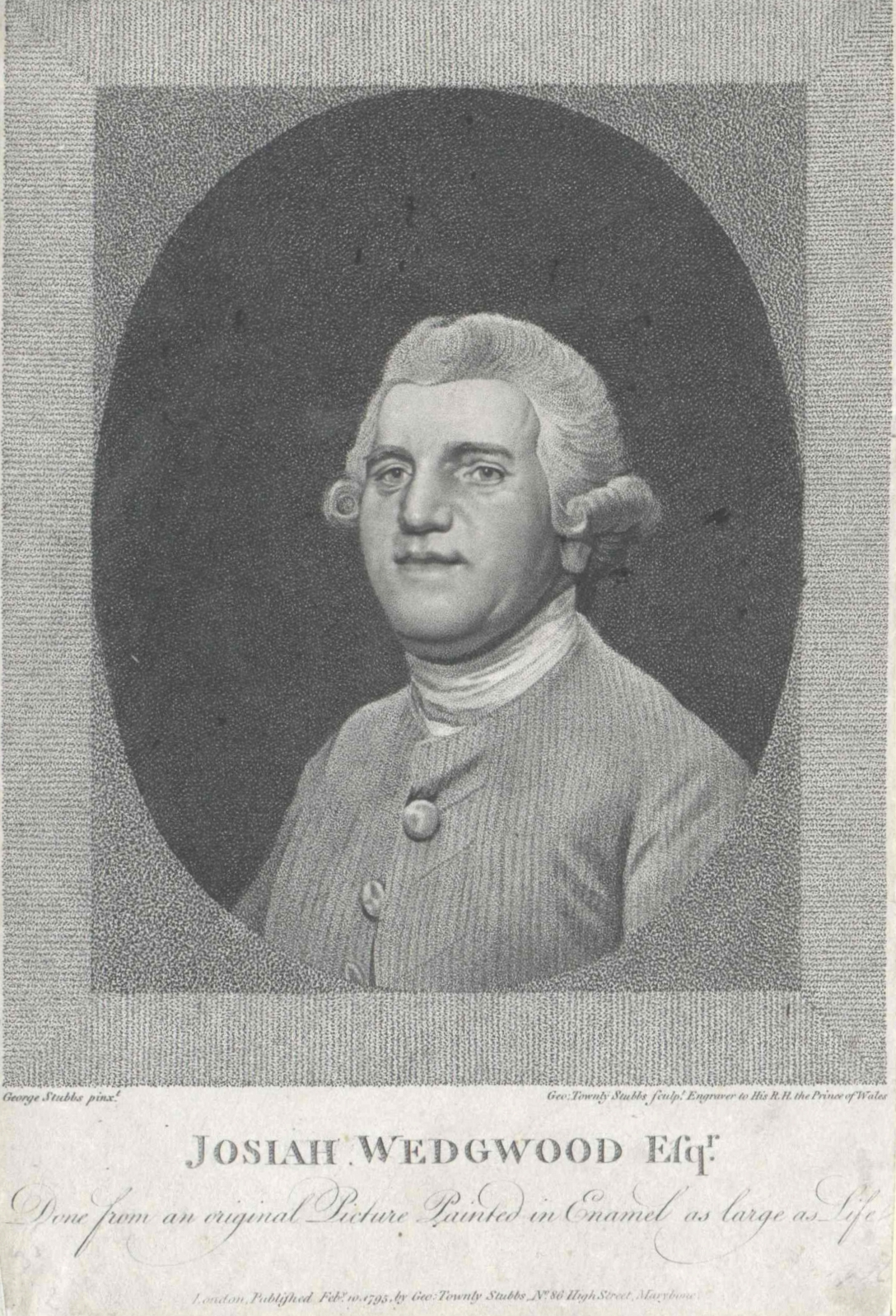
Josiah Wedgwood was a leading entrepreneur in the Industrial Revolution.

The 18th century entrepreneur Josiah Wedgwood is credited with the industrialisation of the manufacture of pottery. Meeting the demands of the consumer revolution and growth in wealth of the middle classes in Britain, Wedgwood created goods such as tableware, which was starting to become a common feature on dining tables. Credited as the inventor of modern marketing, Wedgwood pioneered direct mail, money back guarantees, travelling salesmen, carrying pattern boxes for display, self-service, free delivery, buy one get one free, and illustrated catalogues. Described as "natural capitalists" by the BBC, dynasties of Quakers were successful in business and contributed the Industrial Revolution. This included ironmaking by Abraham Darby I and his family; banking, including Lloyds Banking Group (founded by Sampson Lloyd), Barclays PLC, Backhouse's Bank and Gurney's Bank; life assurance (Friends Provident); pharmaceuticals (Allen & Hanburys); the big three British chocolate companies, Cadbury, Fry's and Rowntree); biscuit manufacturing (Huntley & Palmers); match manufacture (Bryant and May) and shoe manufacturing (Clarks). With his role in the marketing and manufacturing of James Watt's steam engine, and invention of modern coinage, Matthew Boulton is regarded as one of the most influential entrepreneurs in history.

Other important English engineers and inventors in the Industrial Revolution include: George Stephenson, Richard Arkwright, Henry Maudslay and Isambard Kingdom Brunel. England has the oldest railway networks in the world; the Stockton and Darlington Railway, opened in 1825, was the first public railway to use steam locomotives. Opened in 1863, London Underground is the world's first underground railway. Known as the "Father of Railways", Stephenson's rail gauge of 4 feet 8 1/2 inches (1,435 mm) is the standard gauge for most of the world's railways. Henry Maudsley's most influential invention was the screw-cutting lathe, a machine which created uniformity in screws and allowed for the application of interchangeable parts (a prerequisite for mass production): it was a revolutionary development necessary for the Industrial Revolution. Brunel created the Great Western Railway, as well as famous steamships including the SS Great Britain, the first propeller-driven ocean-going iron ship, and SS Great Eastern which laid the first lasting transatlantic telegraph cable.

== Philosophy ==
England has been the cradle of many very important philosophers who have contributed to the development of philosophical currents such as liberalism, utilitarianism, free thinking, enlightened thinking, empiricism, political philosophy and analytical philosophy. The ideas of these thinkers have influenced transcendental historical events such as the Age of Enlightenment, the 1776 Declaration of Independence of the United States, the French Revolution, and the 1948 United Nations' Universal Declaration of Human Rights.

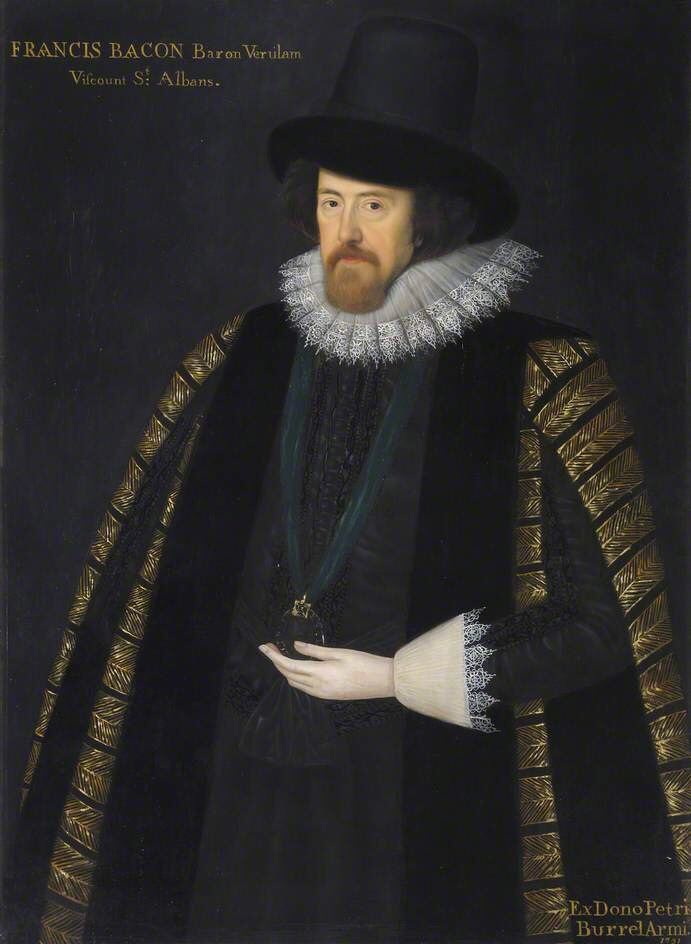
Francis Bacon led the advancement of both natural philosophy and the scientific method and his works remained deeply influential in the Scientific Revolution.

- Thomas More (1478–1535) addressed the social problems of humanity in his summit work, Utopia (1516). The rest of his works have as a common thread the exaltation of idealism and the condemnation of tyranny.
- Francis Bacon (1561–1626) developed philosophical and scientific empiricism, which made him one of the pioneers of modern scientific thinking in developing the experimental scientific method. His most prominent philosophical works are The Advancement of Knowledge (1605), Novum Organum or Indications related to the Interpretation of Nature (1620).
- Thomas Hobbes (1588–1679) was a very influential figure in the development of Western political philosophy through his work Leviathan (1651), a treatise on the nature of human beings and how societies are organized.
- John Locke (1632–1704) is considered the father of enlightened thought, one of the most influential thinkers of the Age of Enlightenment, and one of the founders of social contract theory, epistemology and political philosophy.
- Thomas Paine (1737–1809) had great influence through his writings on social democracy, claiming land ownership, freethinking, religion and slavery, in the American revolutionaries who led the independence of that country.
- Jeremy Bentham (1748–1832) developed the utilitarian doctrine, embodied in his main work: Introduction to the principles of morality and legislation (1789). In addition, it left strengthened and appropriate the concept of Deontology widely used in laws and codes of professional work that looks to the future.
- John Stuart Mill (1806–1873) was a representative of the classical and theoretical economic school of utilitarianism. In his work on freedom, he exposes his fundamental ideas about the limits of freedom of the individual and society.
- Bertrand Russell (1872–1970) was a philosopher, mathematician, logician and writer, winner of the Nobel Prize for Literature, and known for his influence on analytical philosophy in the early twentieth century.

== Sport ==
England has a strong sporting heritage and many sports were codified by the English, and then spread worldwide, including badminton, cricket, croquet, football, field hockey, lawn tennis, rugby league, rugby union, table tennis, darts, bowls, squash, snooker, billiards, and thoroughbred horse racing. It has helped the development of golf, sailing and Formula One. In the late 18th century, the English game of rounders was transported to the American Colonies, where it evolved into baseball. Association football, cricket, rugby union and rugby league are considered to be the national sports of England.

The England national football team, whose home venue is Wembley Stadium, played Scotland in the first ever international football match in 1872. Referred to as the "home of football" by FIFA, England hosted the 1966 FIFA World Cup, and won the tournament by defeating West Germany 4–2 in the final, with Geoff Hurst scoring a hat-trick. With a British television audience peak of 32.30 million viewers, the final is the most watched television event ever in the UK.

The rules of football were first drafted in 1863 by Ebenezer Cobb Morley, and England has the oldest football clubs in the world. At club level, England is recognised by FIFA as the birthplace of club football, due to Sheffield F.C. founded in 1857 being the world's oldest club. The Football Association is the oldest governing body in the sport. The FA Cup and The Football League were the first cup and league competitions respectively. In the modern day, the Premier League is the world's most-watched football league, most lucrative, and amongst the elite. Its biggest clubs include Manchester United, Liverpool, Arsenal, Chelsea, Tottenham Hotspur and Manchester City. In 2016, Leicester City, who were 5,000–1 outsiders at the start of the season, became champions. By some measures it was the greatest sporting upset ever: multiple bookmakers had never paid out at such long odds for any sport.

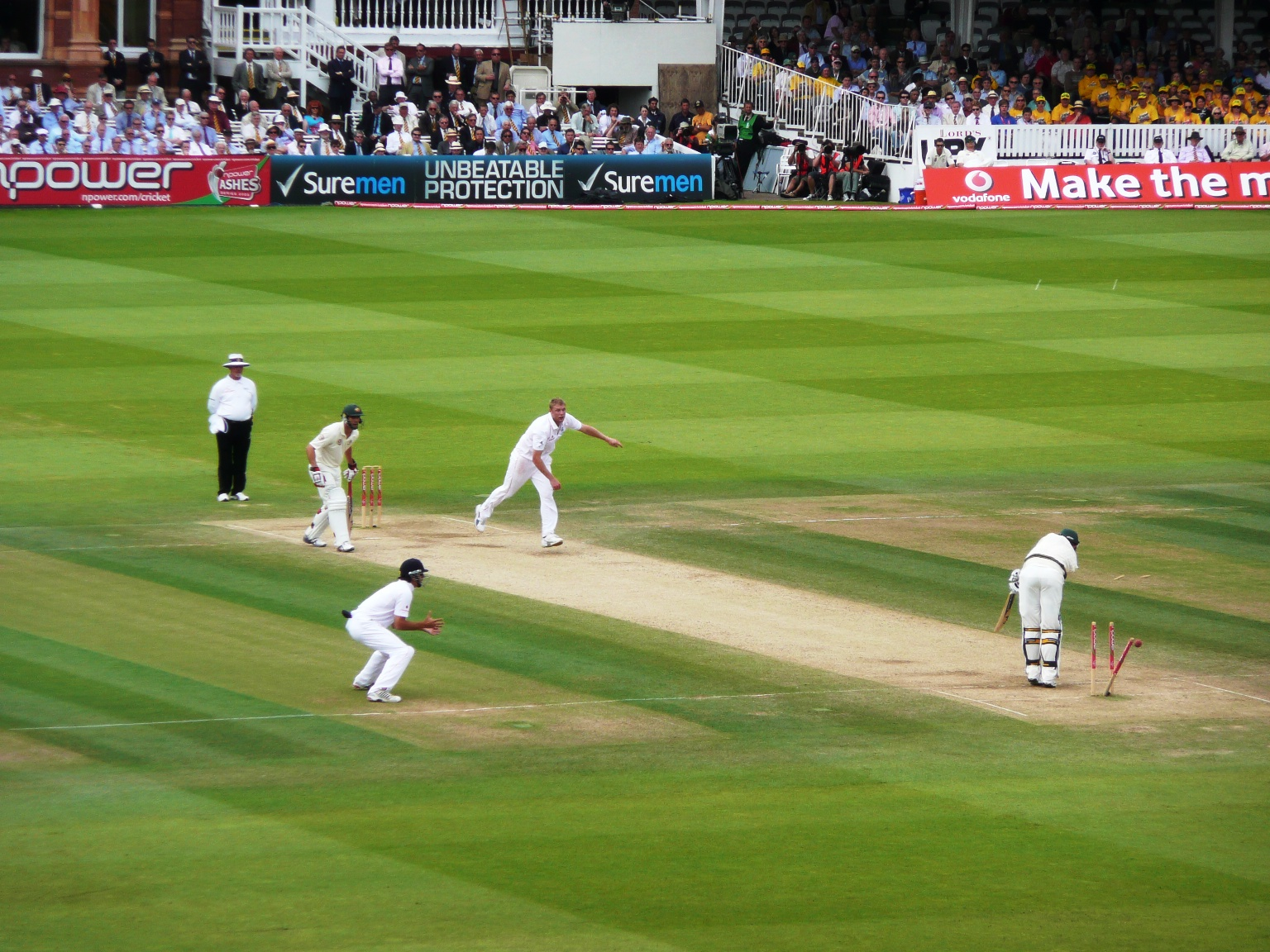
England playing Australia at Lord's Cricket Ground in the 2009 Ashes series. After winning the 2019 Cricket World Cup, England became the first country to win the World Cups in football, rugby union and cricket.

Cricket is generally thought to have been developed in the early medieval period among the farming and metalworking communities of the Weald. The England cricket team is a composite England and Wales team. One of the game's top rivalries is The Ashes series between England and Australia, contested since 1882. The climax of the 2005 Ashes was viewed by 7.4 million as it was available on terrestrial television. England has hosted five Cricket World Cups (1975, 1979, 1983, 1999 and 2019), winning the 2019 edition in a final regarded as one of the greatest one day internationals ever played.

England hosted the ICC World Twenty20 in 2009, winning this format in 2010 beating rivals Australia in the final. In the domestic competition, the County Championship, Yorkshire are by far the most successful club having won the competition 32 times outright and sharing it on 1 other occasion. Lord's Cricket Ground situated in London is sometimes referred to as the "Mecca of Cricket".

Rugby union originated in Rugby School, Warwickshire in the early 19th century. The England rugby union team won the 2003 Rugby World Cup, with Jonny Wilkinson scoring the winning drop goal in the last minute of extra time against Australia. England was one of the host nations of the competition in the 1991 Rugby World Cup and also hosted the 2015 Rugby World Cup. The top level of club participation is the English Premiership. Leicester Tigers, London Wasps, Bath Rugby and Northampton Saints have had success in the Europe-wide Heineken Cup.

Rugby league was born in Huddersfield in 1895. Since 2008, the England national rugby league team has been a full test nation in lieu of the Great Britain national rugby league team, which won three World Cups. Club sides play in Super League, the present-day embodiment of the Rugby Football League Championship. Rugby League is most popular among towns in the northern English counties of Lancashire, Yorkshire and Cumbria. The vast majority of English clubs in Super League are based in the north of England. Some of the most successful clubs include Wigan Warriors, Hull F.C., St. Helens, Leeds Rhinos and Huddersfield Giants; the former three have all won the World Club Challenge previously.

William Penny Brookes was prominent in organising the format for the modern Olympic Games. In 1994, then President of the IOC, Juan Antonio Samaranch, laid a wreath on Brooke's grave, and said, "I came to pay homage and tribute to Dr Brookes, who really was the founder of the modern Olympic Games". London was the first major city to host the Summer Olympic Games three times, in 1908, 1948, and 2012. England competes in the Commonwealth Games, held every four years. Birmingham hosted the 2022 Commonwealth Games, the seventh time a UK country has hosted the event.

Sport England is the governing body responsible for distributing funds and providing strategic guidance for sporting activity in England. England, and other countries of the United Kingdom, compete as a separate nations in some international sporting events. The England cricket team actually represents England and Wales. However, in the Olympic Games, England competes as part of the Great Britain team. English supporters are now more likely to carry the Cross of Saint George flag than the British Union Flag.

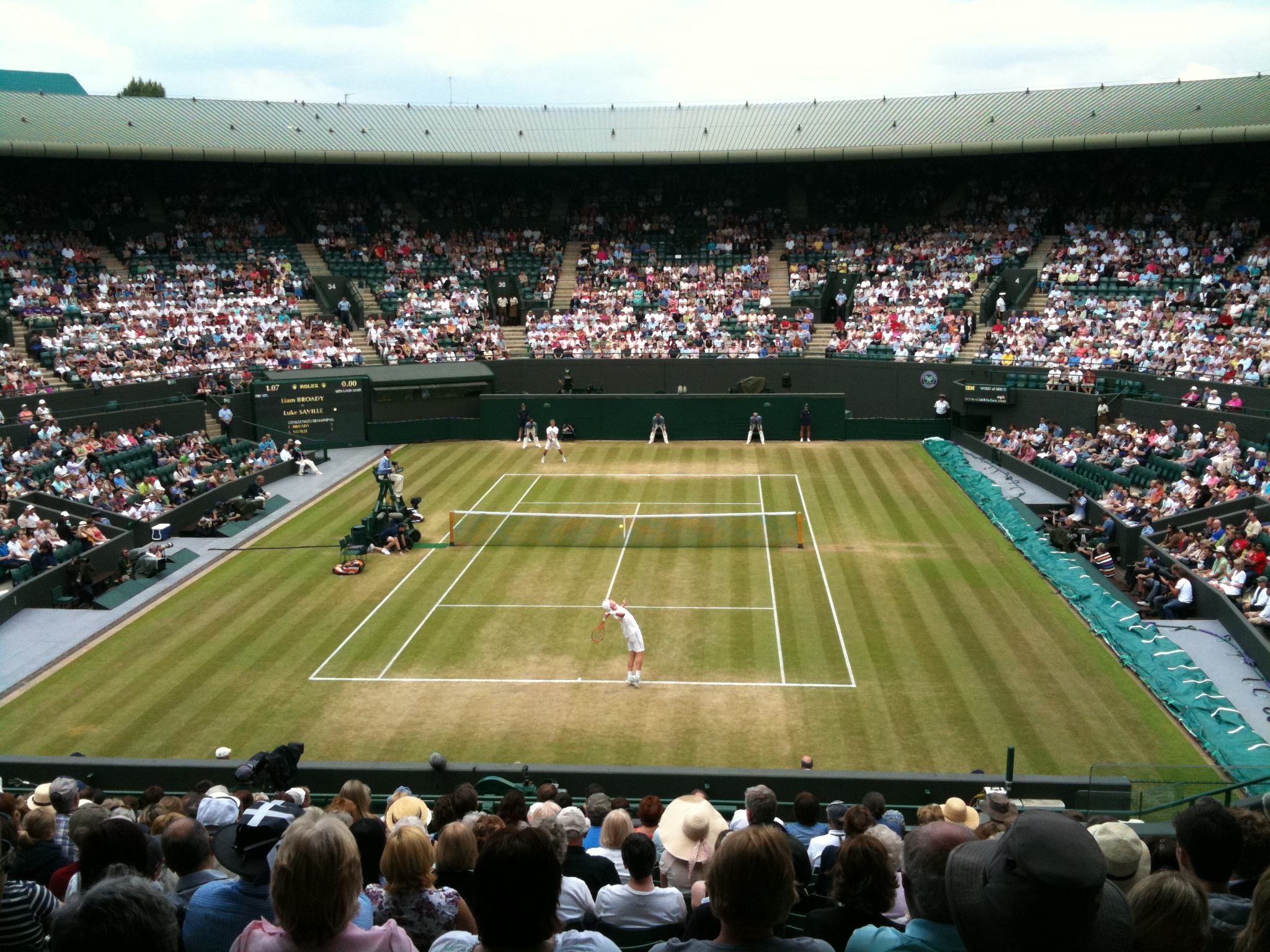
First played in 1877, the Wimbledon Championships is the oldest tennis tournament in the world.

Tennis was created in Birmingham in the late 19th century, and the Wimbledon Championships is the oldest tennis tournament in the world, and widely considered the most prestigious. Major Walter Clopton Wingfield is credited as being a pioneer of the game. The world's oldest tennis tournament, the Wimbledon Championships, first occurred in 1877, and today the event takes place over two weeks in late June and early July. Created in the Tudor period in the court of Henry VIII, the English dessert strawberries and cream is synonymous with the English summer, and is famously consumed at Wimbledon.

The first known modern rowing races began from competition among the professional watermen in England on the River Thames in London. Prizes for wager races were often offered by the London Guilds and Livery Companies or wealthy owners of riverside houses. The oldest surviving such race, Doggett's Coat and Badge was first contested in 1715 and is still held annually from London Bridge to Chelsea. During the 19th century these races were to become numerous and popular, attracting large crowds. Prize matches amongst professionals similarly became popular on other rivers throughout Great Britain in the 19th century, notably on the Tyne. Since 1829 an annual rowing race between the Cambridge University Boat Club and the Oxford University Boat Club, rowed between men's and women's open-weight eights on the River Thames, has taken place. It is also known as the University Boat Race and the Oxford and Cambridge Boat Race.

Golf has been prominent in England; due in part to its cultural and geographical ties to Scotland, the home of Golf. There are both professional tours for men and women, in two main tours: the PGA Tour and the European Tour. England has produced grand slam winners: Cyril Walker, Tony Jacklin, Nick Faldo, and Justin Rose in the men's and Laura Davies, Alison Nicholas, and Karen Stupples in the women's. The world's oldest golf tournament, and golf's first major is The Open Championship, played both in England and Scotland. The biennial golf competition, the Ryder Cup, is named after English businessman Samuel Ryder who sponsored the event and donated the trophy. Nick Faldo is the most successful Ryder Cup player ever, having won the most points (25) of any player on either the European or US teams.

In boxing, under the Marquess of Queensberry Rules, England has produced many world champions across the weight divisions internationally recognised by the governing bodies. World champions include Bob Fitzsimmons, Ted "Kid" Lewis, Randolph Turpin, Nigel Benn, Chris Eubank, Frank Bruno, Lennox Lewis, Ricky Hatton, Naseem Hamed, Amir Khan, Carl Froch, and David Haye. In women's boxing, Nicola Adams became the world's first woman to win an Olympic boxing gold medal at the 2012 Summer Olympics. Originating in 17th and 18th-century England, the thoroughbred is a horse breed best known for its use in horse racing. The National Hunt horse race the Grand National, is held annually at Aintree Racecourse in early April. It is the most watched horse race in the UK, attracting casual observers, and three-time winner Red Rum is the most successful racehorse in the event's history. Red Rum is also the best-known racehorse in the country.

The 1950 British Grand Prix at Silverstone was the first race in the newly created Formula One World Championship. Since then, England has produced some of the greatest drivers in the sport, including; John Surtees, Stirling Moss, Graham Hill (only driver to have won the Triple Crown), Nigel Mansell (only man to hold F1 and IndyCar titles at the same time), Damon Hill, Lewis Hamilton and Jenson Button. It has manufactured some of the most technically advanced racing cars, and many of today's racing companies choose England as their base of operations for its engineering knowledge and organisation. McLaren Automotive, Williams F1, Team Lotus, Honda, Brawn GP, Benetton, Renault, and Red Bull Racing are all, or have been, located in the south of England. England also has a rich heritage in Grand Prix motorcycle racing, the premier championship of motorcycle road racing, and produced several World Champions across all the various class of motorcycle: Mike Hailwood, John Surtees, Phil Read, Geoff Duke, and Barry Sheene.

Darts is a widely popular sport in England; a professional competitive sport, darts is a traditional pub game. The sport is governed by the World Darts Federation, one of its member organisations is the British Darts Organisation (BDO), which annually stages the BDO World Darts Championship, the other being the Professional Darts Corporation (PDC), which runs its own world championship at Alexandra Palace in London. Phil Taylor is widely regarded as the best darts player of all time, having won 187 professional tournaments, and a record 16 World Championships. Trina Gulliver is the ten-time Women's World Professional Darts Champion of the British Darts Organisation. Another popular sport commonly associated with pub games is Snooker, and England has produced several world champions, including Steve Davis and Ronnie O'Sullivan.

The English are keen sailors and enjoy competitive sailing; founding and winning some of the world's most famous and respected international competitive tournaments across the various race formats, including the match race, a regatta, and the America's Cup. England has produced some of the world's greatest sailors, including Francis Chichester, Herbert Hasler, John Ridgway, Robin Knox-Johnston, Ellen MacArthur, Mike Golding, Paul Goodison, and the most successful Olympic sailor ever Ben Ainslie.

== Education ==
England has a long history of promoting education. During the Middle Ages, schools were established to teach Latin grammar to the sons of the aristocracy destined for priesthood or monastic work with the ministry of government or the law. Two universities were established in affiliation with the church: the University of Oxford, followed by the University of Cambridge, to assist in the further training of the Catholic Christian clergy. There is evidence of teaching at Oxford as early as 1096, making it the oldest university in the English-speaking world, the world's second-oldest university in continuous operation and one of the most prestigious academic institutions in the world. Founded in 1209 and granted a royal charter by Henry III in 1231, the University of Cambridge is the second-oldest university in the English-speaking world and the world's fourth-oldest surviving university, as well as one of the most prestigious academic institutions in the world. Apprenticeship was the main way for youths to enter practical occupations.

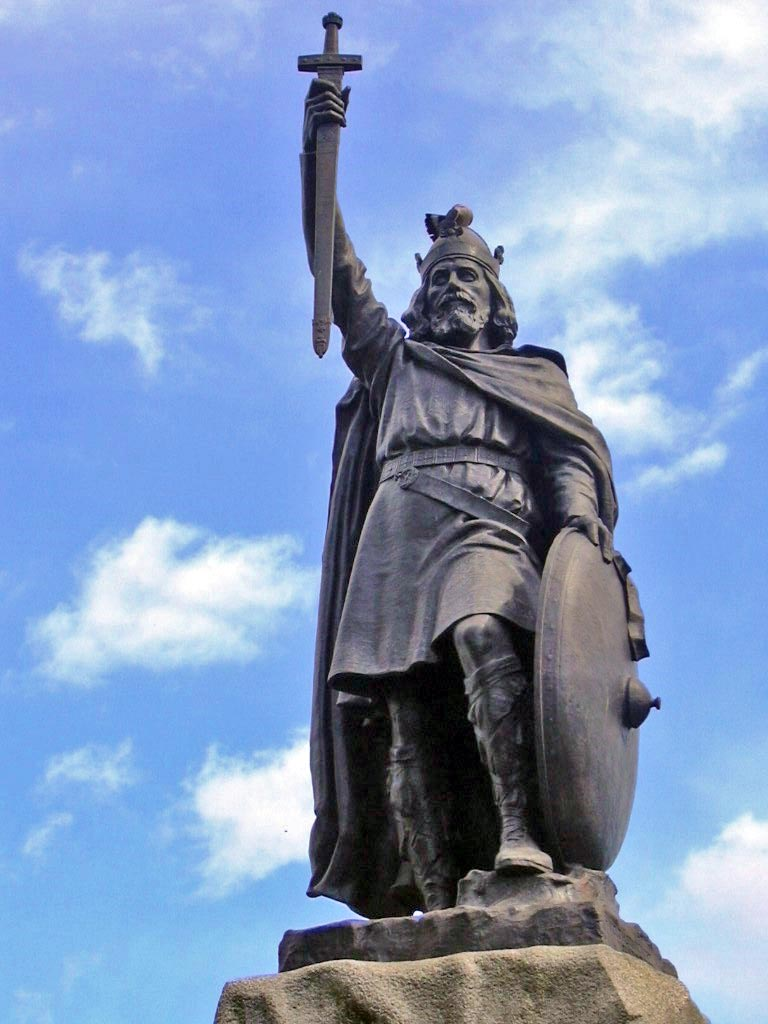
King Alfred the Great statue in Winchester, Hampshire. The 9th-century English king encouraged education in his kingdom.

Private schools have a long history in England; some were set up before the tenth century. The oldest is King's School, Canterbury, which was founded in 597. A group of these schools, much later, invoked the name "public school" to indicate that they were open to the public regardless of religious beliefs. In Tudor times, Edward VI reorganised grammar schools and instituted new ones so that there was a national system of "free grammar schools." In theory these were open to all, offering free tuition to those who could not afford to pay fees. In 1562 the Statute of Artificers and Apprentices was passed to regulate and protect the apprenticeship system, forbidding anyone from practising a trade or craft without first serving a 7-year period as an apprentice to a master. Guilds controlled many trades and used apprenticeships to control entry.

Most schools came under state control in the Victorian era. Initially, schools were categorised as infant schools, primary schools and secondary schools (split into more academic grammar schools and more vocational Secondary modern schools). England has many independent (fee-paying) schools, some founded hundreds of years ago; independent secondary schools are known as public schools. Eton College, Harrow School, Shrewsbury School and Rugby School are four of the best-known. The nature and peculiarities of these public schools have frequently featured in English literature.

State schools are government-funded schools which provide education free of charge to pupils. There are a number of categories of English state-funded schools including academy schools, grammar schools, community schools, faith schools, foundation schools, free schools, studio schools, university technical colleges, and a number of state boarding schools and city technology colleges. About one third of English state-funded schools are faith schools; i.e. affiliated with religious groups, most often from the Church of England (approximately 2/3 of faith schools), or the Roman Catholic Church (around 3/10). A number of state-funded secondary schools are specialist schools, receiving extra funding to develop one or more subjects which the school specialises.

Most primary and secondary schools have compulsory school uniforms. Allowances are almost invariably made to accommodate religious dress, including the Islamic hijab and Sikh bangle (kara). For each of the statutory curriculum subjects, the Secretary of State for Education is required to set out a Programme of Study which outlines the content and matters which must be taught in subjects at the relevant Key Stages. The most recently published National Curriculum was introduced into schools in September 2014.

Grammar schools can be run by the local authority, a foundation body or an academy trust. They select their pupils based on academic ability. The original purpose of medieval grammar schools was the teaching of Latin. Over time the curriculum was broadened, first to include Ancient Greek, and later English and other European languages, natural sciences, mathematics, history, geography, and other subjects. In areas children can enter a prestigious grammar school; there are also a number of isolated fully selective grammar schools and a few dozen partially selective schools. The oldest state school in England is Beverley Grammar School, which was founded in 700 AD.

England's universities include some of the highest-ranked universities in the world; University of Cambridge, University of Oxford, Imperial College London, University College London and King's College London are all ranked in the global top 30 in the 2018 QS World University Rankings. The London School of Economics has been described as the world's leading social science institution for both teaching and research. The London Business School is considered one of the world's leading business schools and in 2010 its MBA programme was ranked best in the world by the Financial Times. Academic degrees in England are usually split into classes: first class (1st), upper second class (2:1), lower second class (2:2), third (3rd), and unclassified.

The Secretary of State for Education is responsible to Parliament for education. Standards in state schools are monitored and inspected by the Office for Standards in Education, and in private schools by the Independent Schools Inspectorate. In 2011, the Trends in International Mathematics and Science Study (TIMSS) rated 13–14-year-old pupils in England 10th in the world for maths and 9th for science. The Programme for International Student Assessment coordinated by the OECD currently ranks the overall knowledge and skills of British 15-year-olds as 13th in the world in literacy, mathematics, and science with the average British student scoring 503.7, above the OECD average.

== Media ==
England has a rich television and broadcasting heritage. Although cinema, theatre, dance and live music are popular, the favourite pastime is watching television. The television channels include BBC, ITV, Channel 4 and Channel 5 as well as other television channels specialising in entertainment, drama, culture, arts, science, travel, nature, and sports. Television networks include UKTV channels such as U&Yesterday, U&Eden and U&Dave owned by BBC Studios. The broadcaster Sky has several flagship channels, including Sky Arts, Sky Atlantic, Sky Cinema, and Sky Nature.

The BBC is a publicly funded broadcaster that has been in service since 1922, paid by taxation. Its mission is to inform, educate, and entertain. Channel 4 is similarly chartered to the BBC, with a remit to provide public service broadcasting and schools programs, however it runs commercial advertisements to provide a revenue stream. It produces a number of digital channels, branded as Channel 4, as well as More4 and Film4. The Royal Television Society is an educational charity for the discussion, and analysis of television in all its forms, past, present, and future. It is the oldest television society in the world.

Radio is dominated by the BBC, which operates radio stations both at home and abroad. The BBC World Service radio network is broadcast in 33 languages globally. Other radio broadcasters are Heart Radio, Classic FM, and Smooth Radio. The most popular radio station by number of listeners is BBC Radio 2, closely followed by BBC Radio 3, BBC Radio 4 and BBC Radio 1. BBC News, BBC Parliament, ITV News, Channel 4 News, and Sky News are the country's most dominant news broadcasters. Radio, television, and broadcasting are regulated. Newspapers produced in England include Financial Times, The Guardian and The Times. The Economist is also a widely read magazine covering current affairs, international business, politics, science and technology.

A large range of magazines are sold in England covering most interests and potential topics. English magazines and journals that have achieved worldwide circulation include Nature, New Scientist, The Spectator, Prospect, Apollo, NME, and the Radio Times. The National Trust and English Heritage have their own monthly membership magazines devoted to photography, heritage, nature, wildlife, and arts. Other popular magazines include BBC Gardeners' World, BBC History Magazine, BBC Science Focus, BBC Sky at Night, BBC Music, BBC Good Food, Country Life, The World of Interiors, and Classic & Sports Car.

== National symbols ==
Tudor rose

Royal Arms of England

The English use as their national flag the red cross of St George. St George's Day is marked as the day of the patron saint, and is also celebrated as the day of the birth and death of William Shakespeare.

In 1198, King Richard the Lionheart introduced the coat of arms of England, depicting three lions. The three lions form the basis of several emblems of English national sports teams, such as the England national football team, and the English national cricket team (though in blue rather than gold).

The English oak and the Tudor rose are also English symbols; a modernised version of the rose is used by the England national rugby union team.

The Barbary lion is a national animal of England. In the Middle Ages, the lions kept in the menagerie at the Tower of London were Barbary lions. English medieval warrior rulers with a reputation for bravery attracted the nickname "the Lion": the most famous example is Richard I of England, known as Richard the Lionheart. Lions are frequently depicted in English heraldry, either as a device on shields themselves, or as supporters. They also appear in sculpture, and sites of national importance. The lion is used as a symbol of English sporting teams, such as the England national cricket team.

The oak is the national tree of England, representing strength and endurance. The Royal Oak and Oak Apple Day commemorate the escape of King Charles II from the grasps of the Parliamentarians (Roundheads) after the Battle of Worcester in 1651 (the last battle of the English Civil War); he hid in an oak tree to avoid detection before making it safely into exile. The Major Oak is an 800–1000 year old oak in Sherwood Forest, fabled as the principal hideout of Robin Hood.

The rose is England's national flower. Usually red, it is used, for instance, in the emblems of the English Golf Union and England national rugby union team. The Tudor rose, which takes its name from the Tudor dynasty, was adopted as a national emblem of England around the time of the Wars of the Roses as a symbol of peace. It is a syncretic symbol in that it merged the white rose of the Yorkists and the red rose of the Lancastrians – cadet branches of the Plantagenets – who went to war over control of the royal house. It is also known as the Rose of England.

England has no official anthem; however, the United Kingdom's "God Save the King" is commonly used. Other songs are sometimes used, including "Land of Hope and Glory" (used as England's anthem in the Commonwealth Games), "Jerusalem" (sung at international cricket matches), "Rule Britannia", and "I Vow to Thee, My Country". Certain groups are advocating the adoption of an official English anthem following similar adoptions in Scotland and Wales.

== See also ==
- List of museums in England
- Anglicisation
- Anglophile
- English understatement
- Goth subculture
