= List of blue cheeses =

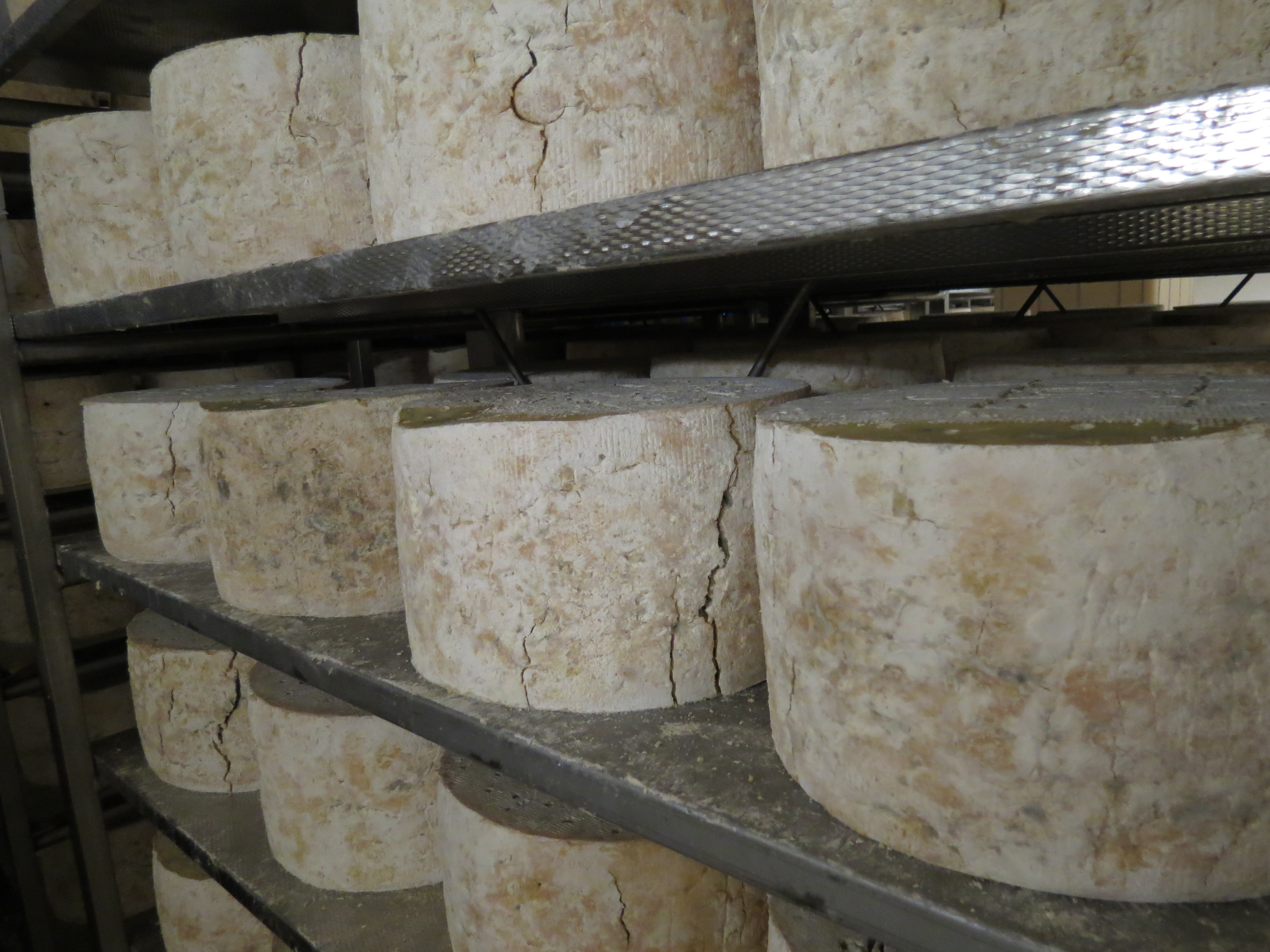
Wheels of gorgonzola cheese ripening

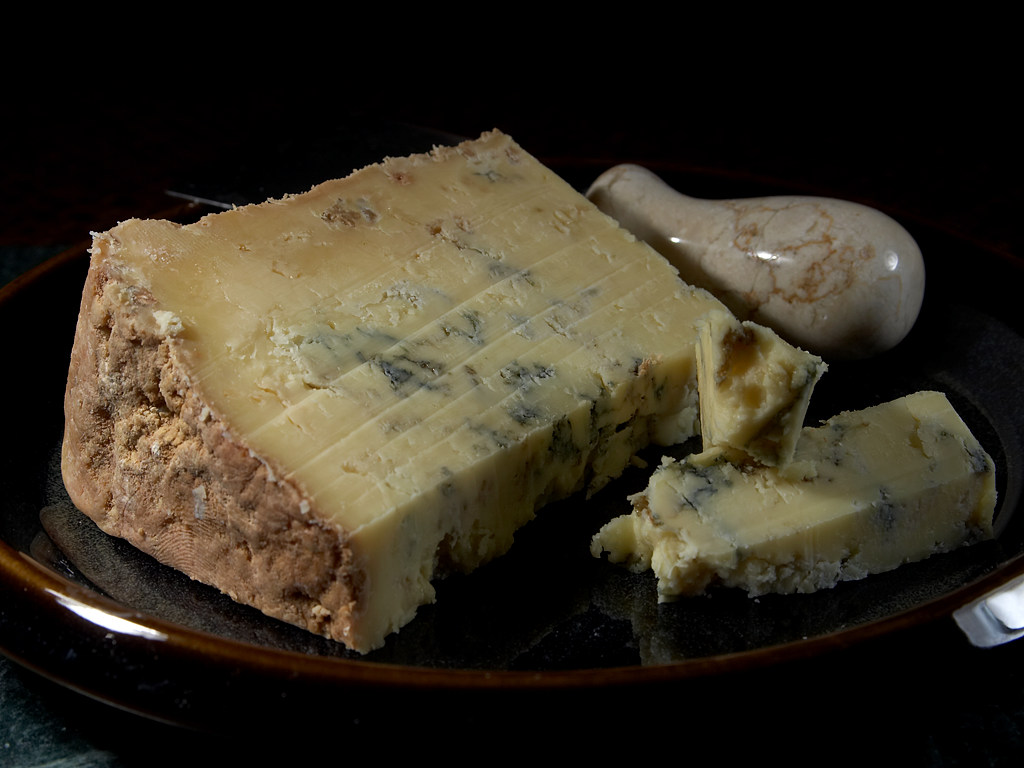
Dorset Blue Vinney

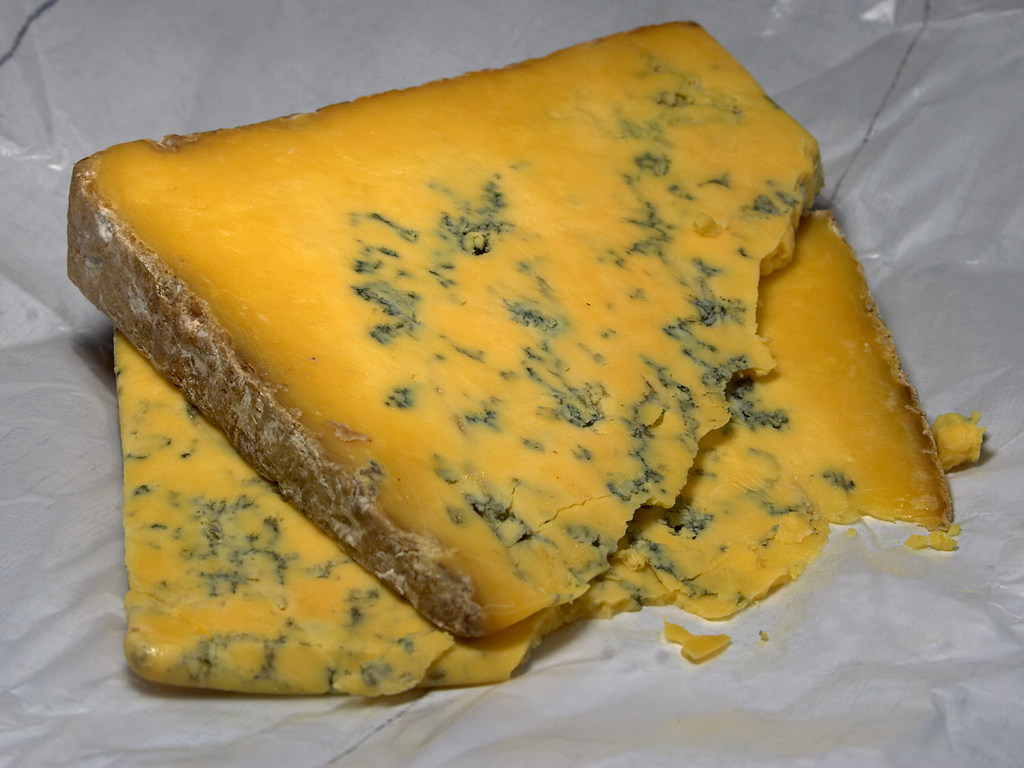
Shropshire Blue

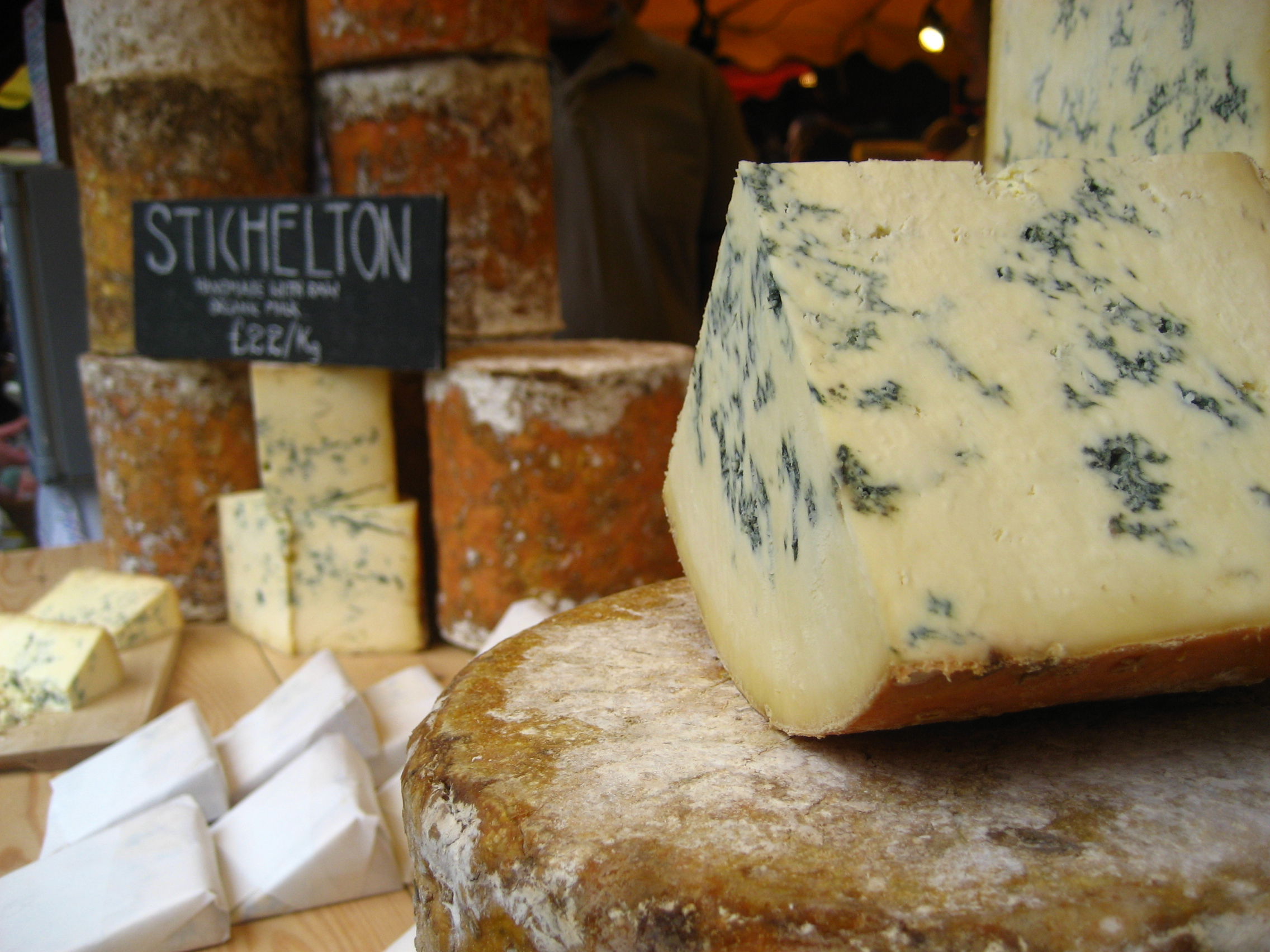
Stichelton at a market

Blue cheese is a general classification of cheeses that have had cultures of the mold Penicillium added so that the final product is spotted or veined throughout with blue, or blue-grey mold and carries a distinct smell, either from that or various specially cultivated bacteria. Some blue cheeses are injected with spores before the curds form, and others have spores mixed in with the curds after they form. Blue cheeses are typically aged in a temperature-controlled environment such as a cave. Blue cheese can be eaten by itself or can be spread, crumbled or melted into or over foods.

== Blue cheeses ==
- Ädelost
- Aura cheese
- Beenleigh Blue
- Bleu Bénédictin
- Bleu d'Auvergne
- Bleu de Bresse
- Bleu de Gex
- Bleu des Causses
- Bleu du Vercors-Sassenage
- Bleuchâtel
- Blue Cheshire
- Brighton Blue
- Buxton Blue
- Cabrales cheese
- Cambozola
- Carré d'Aurillac
- Cashel Blue
- Castello
- Cherni Vit
- Danish Blue Cheese
- Dolcelatte
- Dorset Blue Vinney
- Dovedale cheese
- Dragon's Breath Blue
- Fourme d'Ambert
- Fourme de Montbrison
- Gamalost
- Gorgonzola
- Kariki Tinou
- Kraftkar
- Lanark Blue
- Lymeswold cheese
- Maytag Blue cheese
- Niva
- Norbury Blue
- Oxford Blue
- Österkron
- Picón Bejes-Tresviso
- Rokpol
- Roquefort
- Saga
- Saint Agur Blue
- Shropshire Blue
- Stichelton
- Stilton cheese
- Strathdon Blue
- Valdeón cheese
- Wensleydale cheese
- Yorkshire Blue

== See also ==
- List of cheeses
- Blue cheese
