= Oxford Blue (cheese) =

Blue cheese produced in Oxfordshire, England

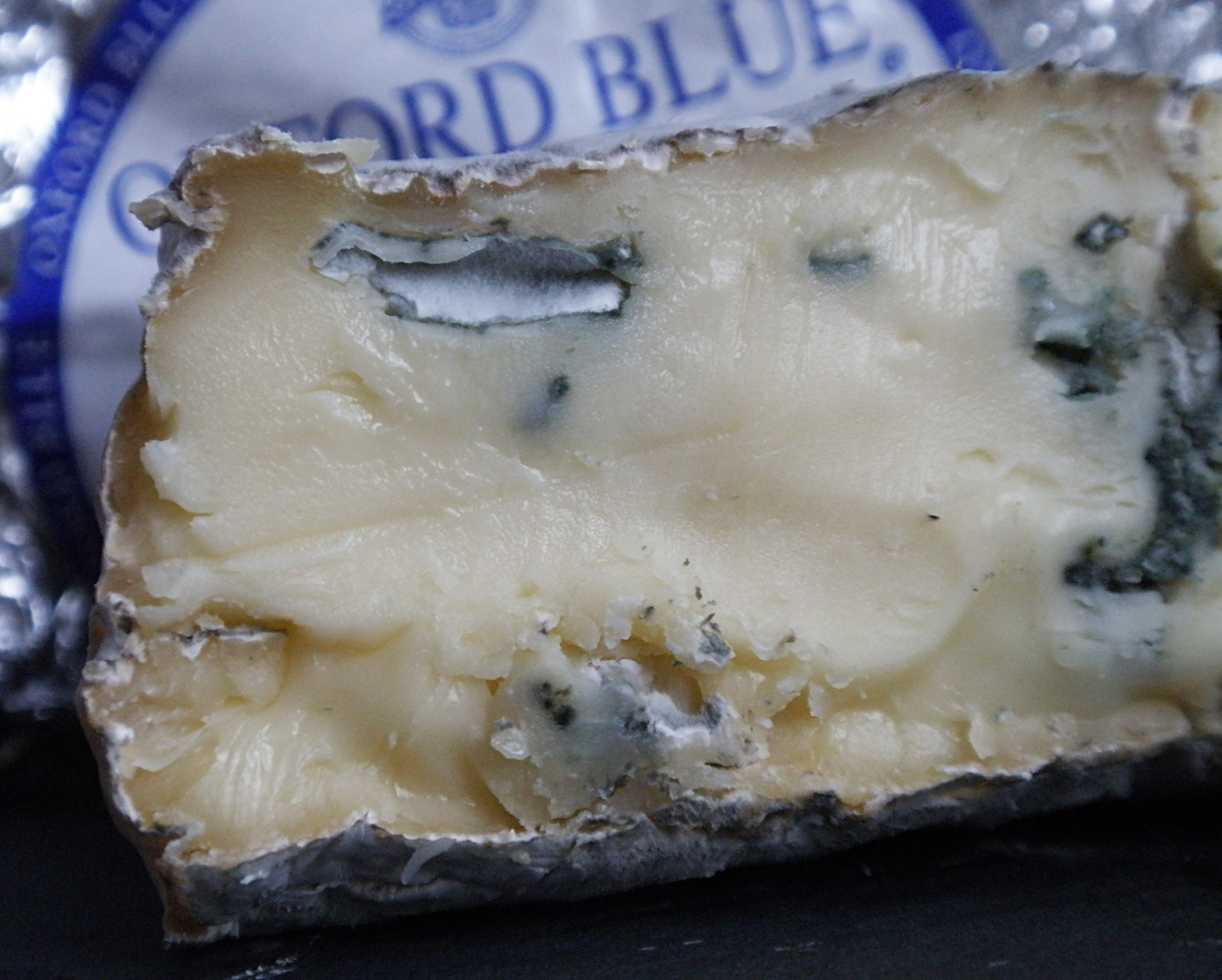
Oxford Blue sold by the Oxford Cheese Company

Oxford Blue is a variety and brand of blue cheese produced in Burford, Oxfordshire, England in 1995 by French baron Robert Pouget in the tradition of Stilton cheese (it was produced in a Stilton dairy) but with a creamier consistency especially when the cheese was allowed to mature. It is a soft and creamy cheese that has tangy, aromatic and spicy qualities. By 2013, around five tonnes were produced monthly.

== Characteristics ==
Oxford Blue is prepared using unpasteurised cow's milk and is ripened (aged) for 14 to 16 weeks. Its rind is sticky and wet in texture. The cheese is soft, creamy and moist, has aromatic, tangy and spicy qualities, and has traces of white wine and chocolate in its flavour. It has been described as a "French-style English blue" that can be used "as an alternative" to Stilton cheese", and as similar to Dolcelatte and St Agur cheeses, with a less strong flavour than Roquefort or Stilton.

== History ==
Oxford Blue was created by French baron Robert Pouget in 1995. It was initially produced by Hartington Creamery in Derbyshire until 2009, when the creamery closed, and subsequently in Carmarthenshire, Wales. In 2013, efforts began to start producing Oxford Blue at a new, small dairy in Burford, Oxfordshire, which was developed in a converted barn. At the Burford site in 2013, Pouget encountered an initial problem of having nowhere to dispose of waste whey, a byproduct of the cheese's production, which was at around 50,000 litres (11,000 imp gal) each month. The problem was solved by the introduction of an anaerobic digester to process the whey. In 2015 the cheese was distributed by the Oxford Cheese Company.

== See also ==
- List of blue cheeses
- List of British cheeses
