= Ädelost =

Swedish blue cheese

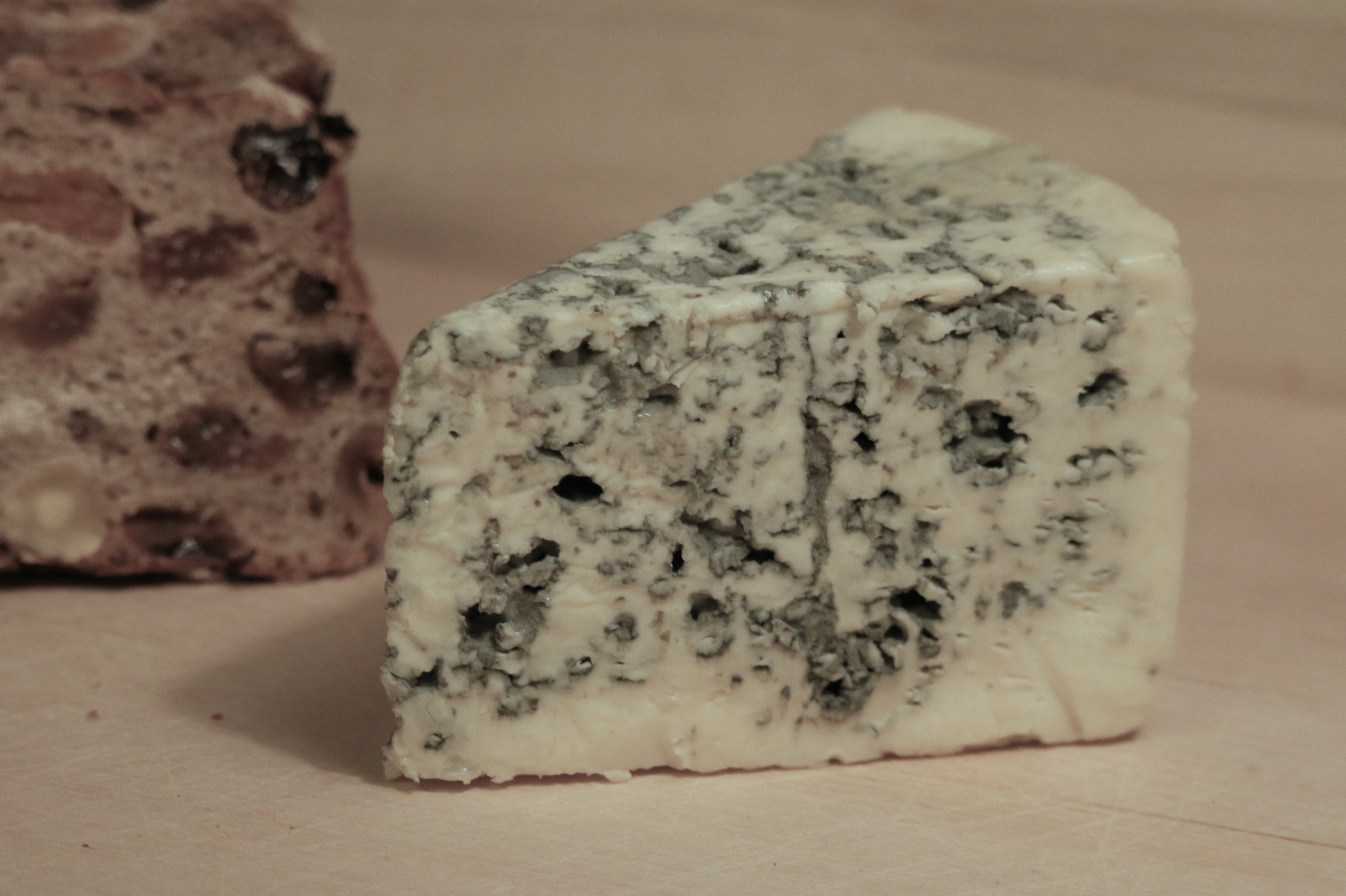
- Country of origin: Sweden
- Source of milk: Cows
- Pasteurized: Yes
- Texture: Creamy
- Fat content: 50%
- Dimensions: 18 cm x 10 cm
- Weight: 2.5 kg
- Aging time: 2-3 months

Ädelost (literally meaning "noble cheese" or "fine cheese") is blue cheese from Sweden, made from pasteurized cow's milk. Swedish-made cheese, which is called "ädelost" or "ädel", is generally made from cow's milk and can be said to be a Swedish version of the French blue cheese.

== Notable characteristics ==
Notable characteristics include a light cream color with evenly distributed blue-gray veins and a sharp, salty flavor. The cheese has a slightly moldy rind and typically comes in cylinders of 18 cm (7.1 in) in diameter by 10 cm (3.9 in) in height, with a finished weight of 2.5 kg (5.5 lb). Ädelost has a fat content of 50% and ripens in 2 to 3 months. It is often used as a table cheese.

== See also ==
- Danablu from Denmark
