= Dragon's Breath Blue =

Canadian cheese

Dragon's Breath Blue is a regional cheese from Nova Scotia, Canada. It is a soft surface-ripened blue cheese that is sold in a black wax casing. The texture of the cheese ranges from soft and creamy to a hard and buttery texture. The cheese often produces a flavour-rich briny liquid. It has a strong aroma and pungent taste.

The cheese is produced by the van den Hoek family at That Dutchman's Farm, in Upper Economy. In April 2016, it was awarded Best Blue Cheese in Canada.

== See also ==
- List of cheeses
