= Bleuchâtel =

Swiss blue cheese

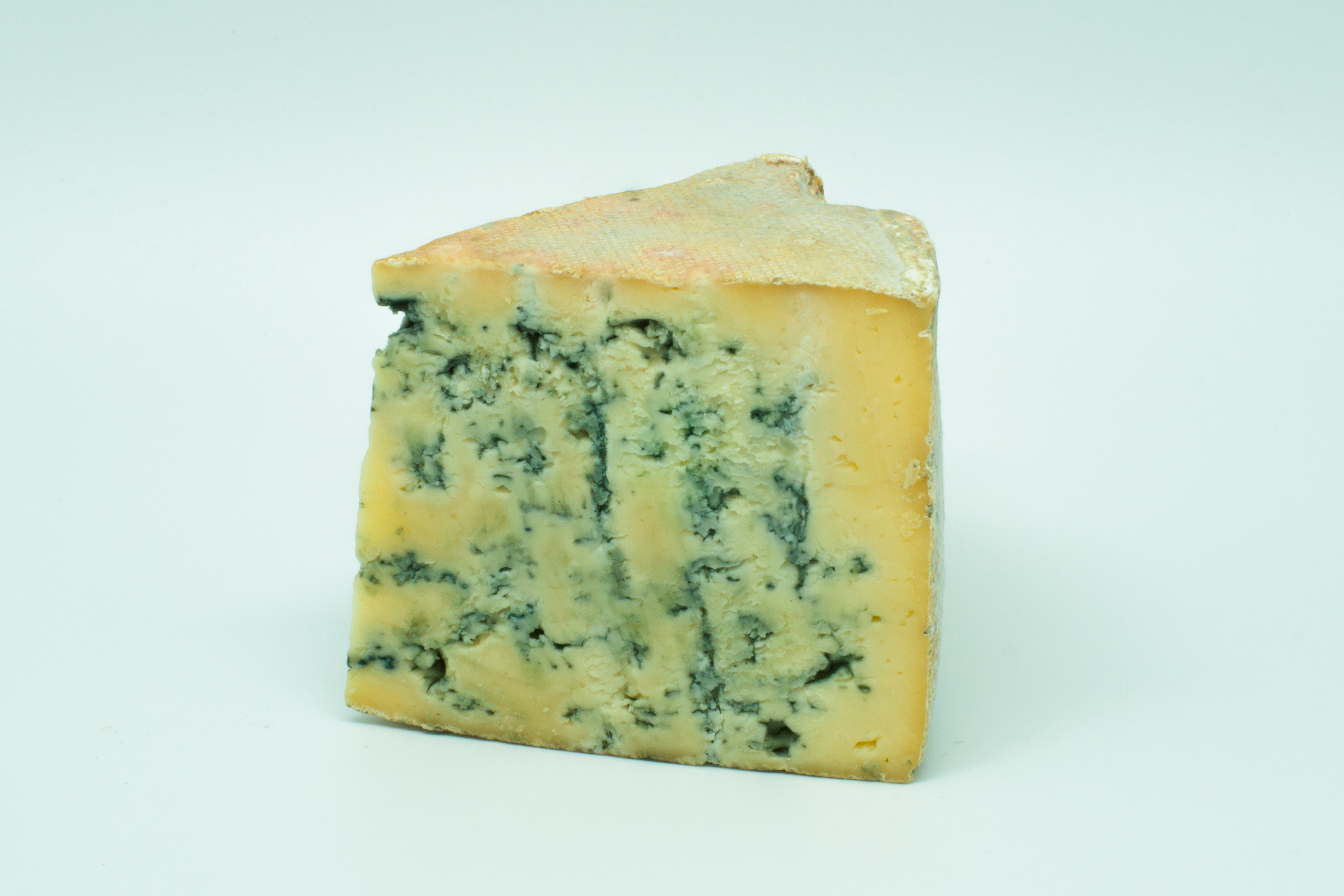
Bleuchâtel cheese

Bleuchâtel (French pronunciation: [bløʃatɛl]) is a Swiss blue cheese produced from pasteurized cow's milk in Les Ponts-de-Martel in Switzerland. Its name comes from bleu (blue in French) and Neuchâtel.

== See also ==
- Cheeses of Switzerland
- Blue cheese
