= Bleu Bénédictin =

Canadian blue cheese

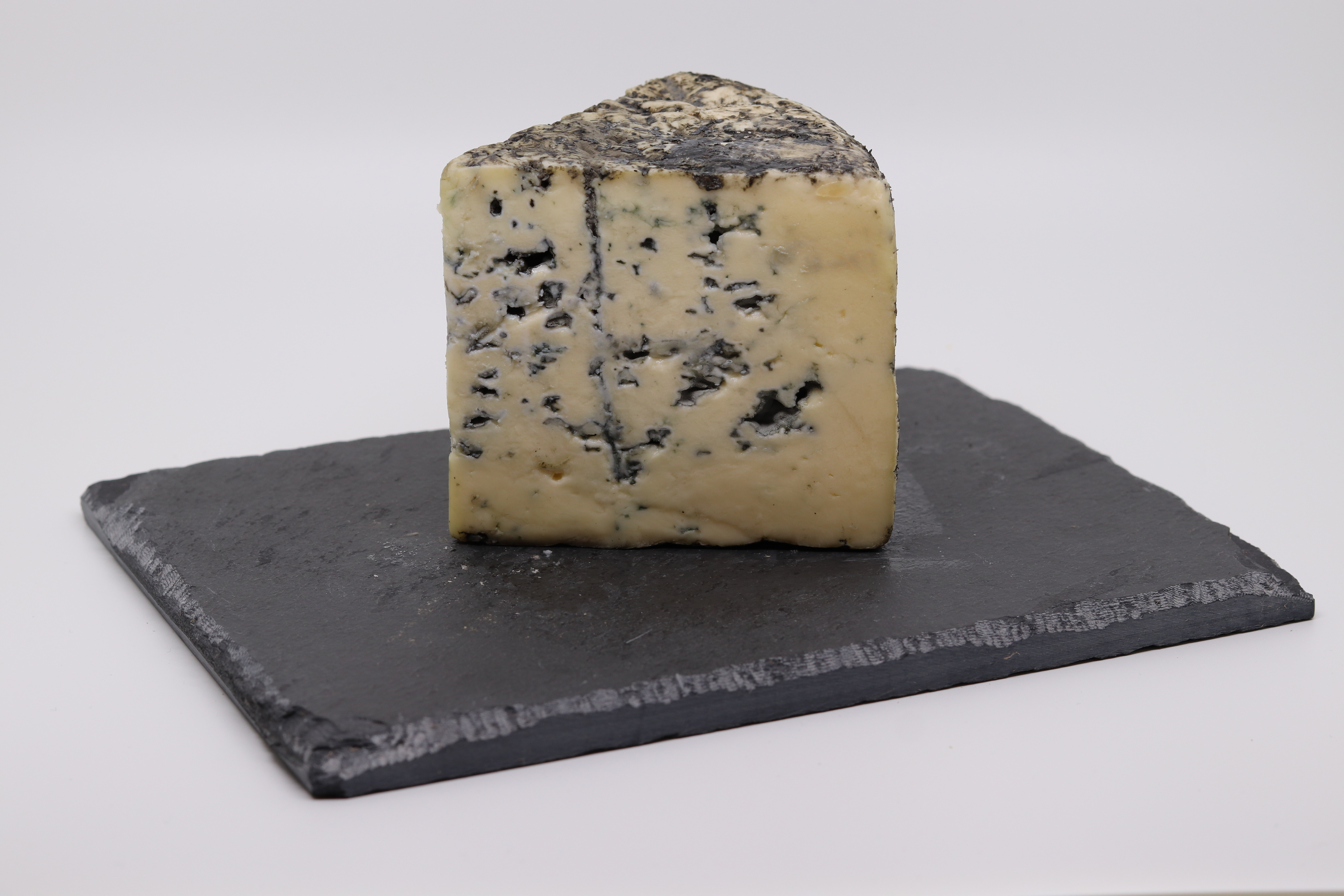
Bleu bénédictin

Bleu Bénédictin (French pronunciation: [blø benediktɛ̃]) is a Canadian blue cheese made by the monks at the Benedictine Abbey of Saint-Benoît-du-Lac, Quebec.

The cheese is a semi-soft, whole milk blue cheese deeply veined with the Roquefort penicillium mold. A wheel of Bénédictin weighs 2 kg (4.4 lb) and has a whitish-grey coating.

The aroma of the cheese is reminiscent of mushrooms and has a creamy, delicately salted flavour. The middle of the cheese wheel is especially creamy.

== See also ==
- List of cheeses
