= Carré d'Aurillac =

French cheese

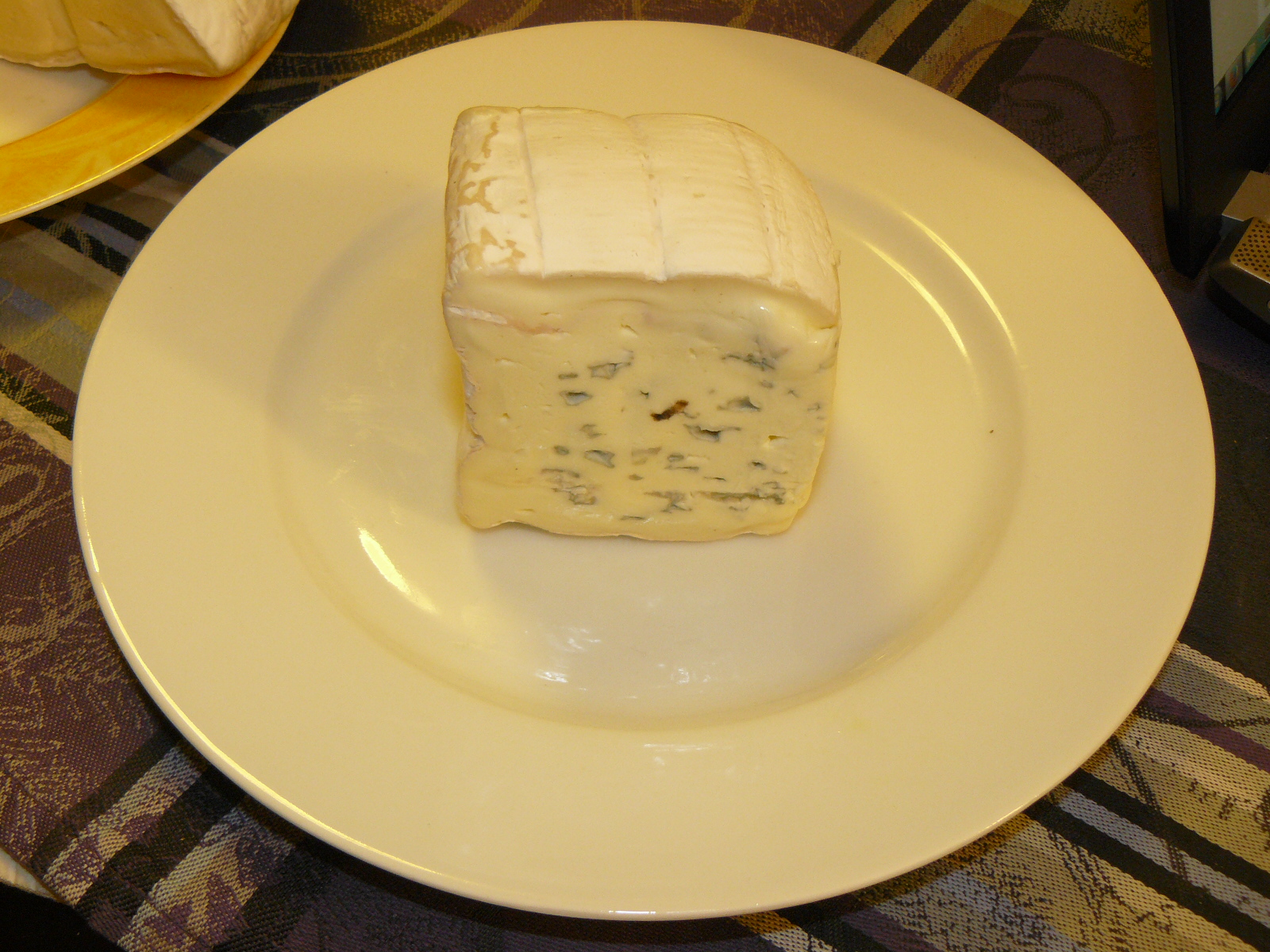
- Country of origin: France
- Region: France
- Town: Auvergne
- Source of milk: Cow
- Pasteurized: Yes
- Texture: Semi-soft

Carré d'Aurillac (Occitan: Carrat d'Aurilhac) is a brand of blue cheese owned by the Toulouse based co-operatively owned cheese company Les Fromageries Occitanes. It is an industrially produced blue cheese also sometimes known as Bleu d'Aurillac (Blau d'Aurilhac). The cheese itself is produced at Bedoussac, which is administratively part of the rural commune of Saint-Mamet-la-Salvetat in the French department of Cantal.

The cheese is square (carré) in shape and made from pasteurized cow's milk.
