= Rokpol =

Polish cheese

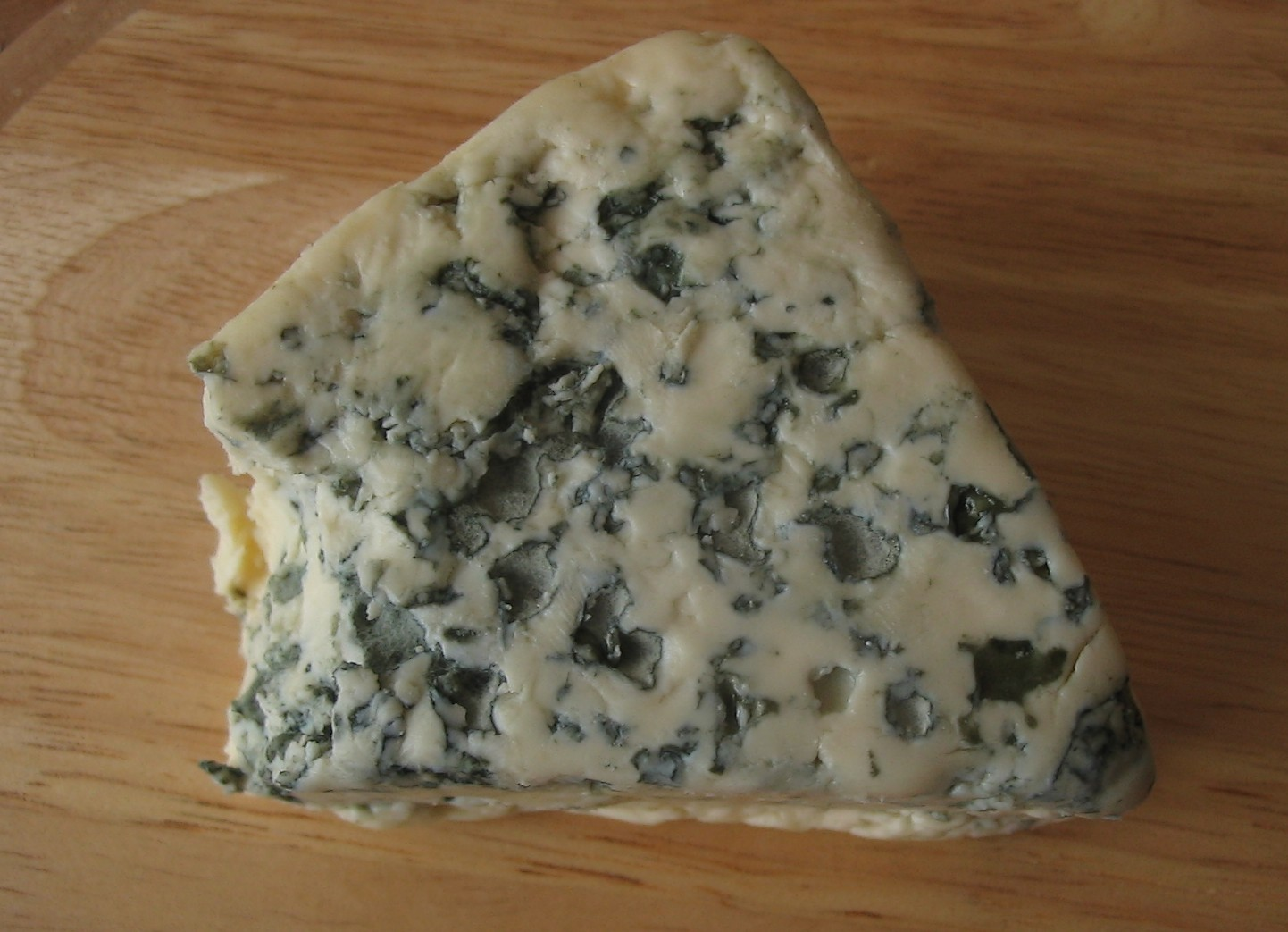
Polish Rokpol cheese

Rokpol is a Polish blue cheese similar to French blue cheeses, with a pungent, salty taste and moderate astringency. The name derives from Roquefort and suggests that it is more specifically from Polish Roquefort. However, unlike Roquefort, it is made from cow's milk.

== Abstract ==
Yeast microflora on the surface and interior of Rokpol cheese was examined for cheeses produced at three dairies located in Lower Silesia, Poland. Yeast populations on the surface of the cheeses ranged from 105–109 cfu/g, but were 10–100 times lower for interior samples. The occurrence and proportions of yeast species varied, depending on the dairy plant and cheese sample. The most frequently isolated species were: Candida famata and C. spherica, followed by C. intermedia and Geotrichum sp. Other species such as Saccharomyces kluyveri, C. kefyr and C. lipolytica were found occasionally. Extracellular and intracellular proteolytic and lipolytic activities were examined for 39 isolates of C. famata.

== Keywords ==
Rokpol cheese

Yeasts

Proteolytic and lipolytic enzymes

Candida famata
