= Cambozola =

German blue cheese

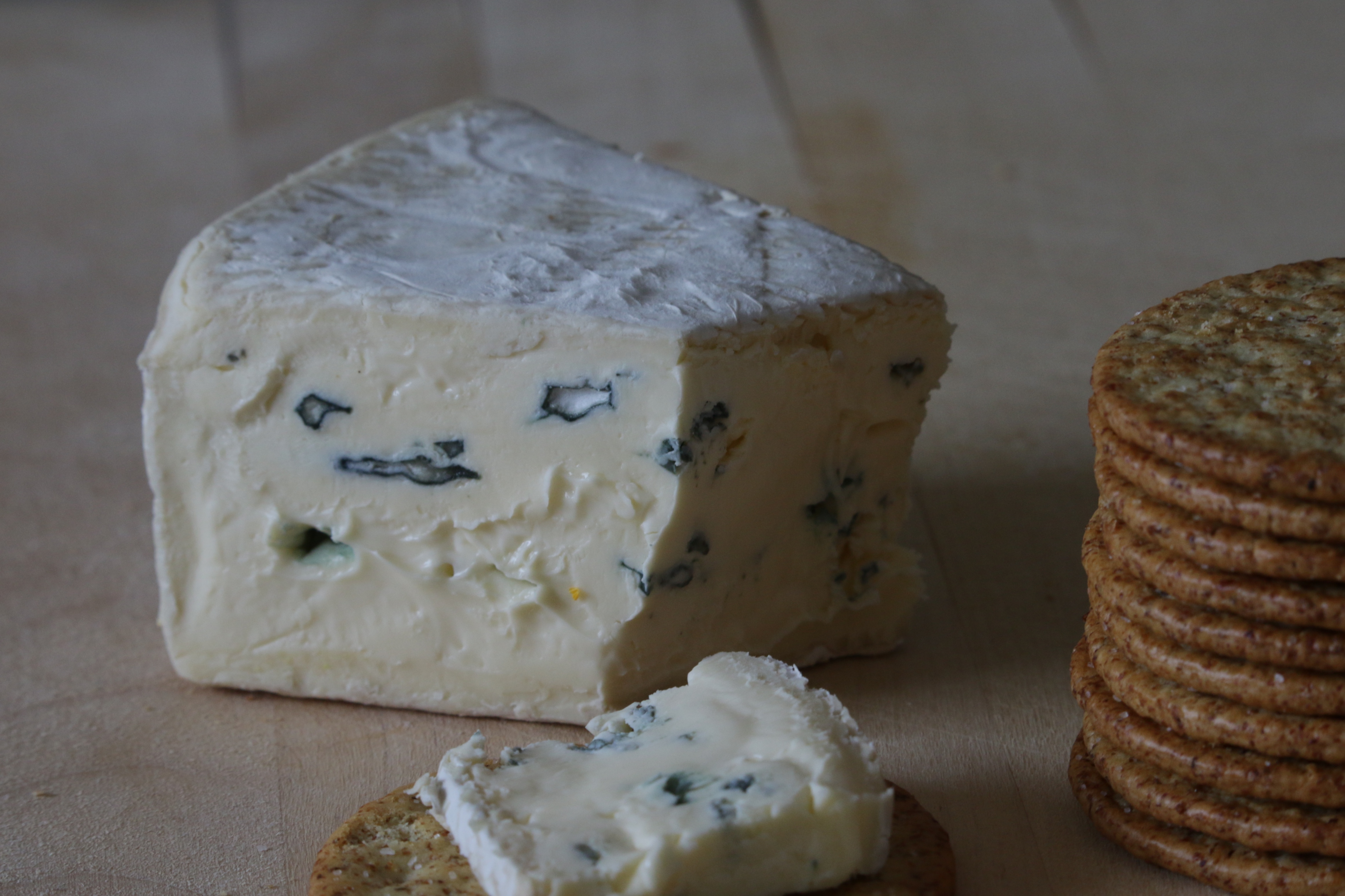
- Country of origin: Germany
- Region, town: Allgäu
- Source of milk: Cow
- Pasteurised: Yes
- Texture: soft
- Fat content: 42%
- Protein content: 13-14%
- Aging time: 4 to 6 weeks
- Certification: None
- Named after: a combination of Camembert and Gorgonzola

Cambozola is a German soft-ripened blue cheese made from cow's milk with a creamy flavour developed by the company Hofmeister-Champignon. It is made with Penicillium roqueforti mould, which gives it blue veins, and Penicillium camemberti to produce a white rind.

== History ==
Cambozola was patented by the German company Hofmeister-Champignon, and has been produced since 1983. The name is an evocation of the protected designation Gorgonzola. In English-speaking countries, Cambozola is sometimes described as blue brie.

== Composition and nutritional information ==
Cambozola is made with Penicillium camemberti and the blue Penicillium roqueforti mould used to make blue cheeses such as Gorgonzola, Roquefort, and blue Stilton. Extra cream is added to the milk, giving Cambozola a rich consistency characteristic of triple crèmes, and the edible bloomy rind is similar to that of Camembert. Cambozola is considerably milder than Gorgonzola piccante. It has a smooth, creamy texture with a subdued "blue cheese" flavour.

Cambozola cheese has a composition of around 58.3% pasteurised cow's milk, 20.8% cream, 10.4% salt, 7.8% bacterial cultures (to ferment milk sugars), and 2.7% mould cultures (responsible for the blue veins inside).

100 grams of a typical Cambozola provides 420 calories, and contain 42 grams of fat (of which 28 are saturated fat), 14 grams of protein, 0.7g of sodium, and 0.5 g of carbohydrates, all sugars.

== See also ==
- List of German cheeses
- List of cheeses
