= Stilton =

English type of cheese

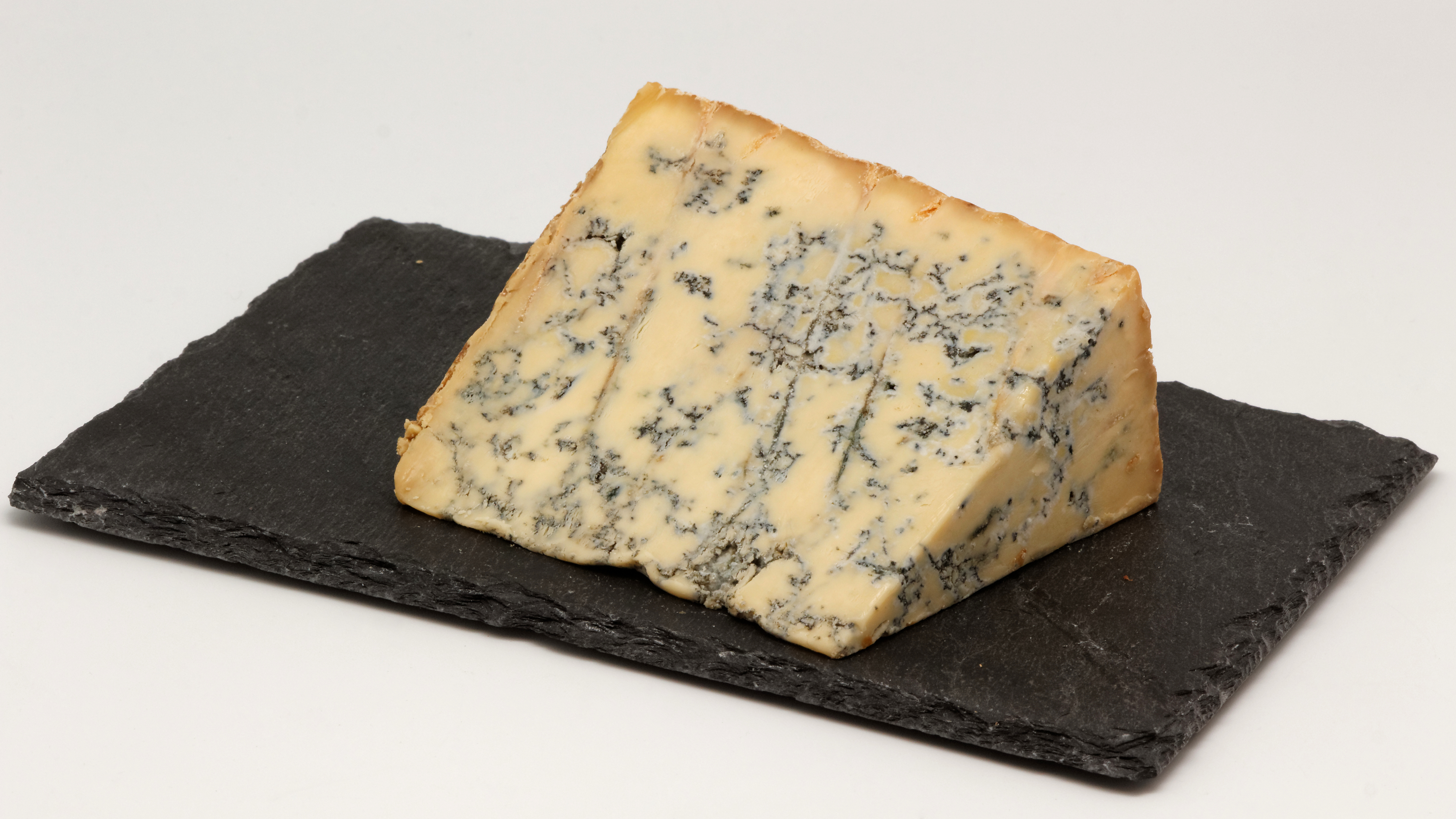
- Blue Stilton
- Country of origin: England
- Region: Derbyshire, Leicestershire, and Nottinghamshire
- Source of milk: Cows
- Pasteurised: Yes
- Texture: Semi-soft, crumbly, creamier with increasing age
- Aging time: 9 weeks minimum
- Certification: PDO
- Named after: Stilton

Stilton is an English cheese, produced in two varieties: blue, which has Penicillium roqueforti added to generate a characteristic smell and taste, and white, which does not. Both have been granted the status of a protected designation of origin (PDO) by the European Commission, requiring that only such cheese produced in the three counties of Derbyshire, Leicestershire and Nottinghamshire may be called Stilton. The cheese takes its name from the village of Stilton, now in Cambridgeshire, where the cheese was originally sold. Today, cheese made there cannot be named Stilton because of the PDO.

== History ==
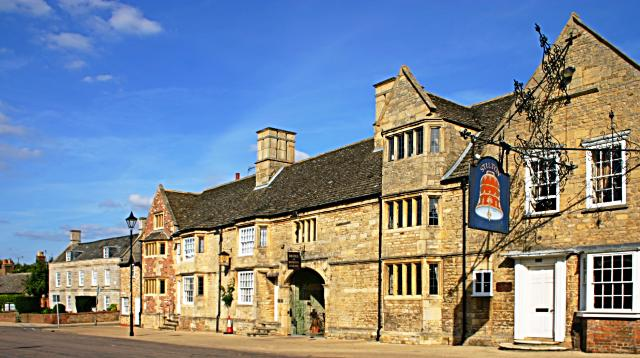
The Bell Inn at Stilton, Cambridgeshire, in 2005

Frances Pawlett (or Paulet), a cheesemaker of Wymondham, Leicestershire, has traditionally been credited with setting up the modern Stilton cheese shape and style in the 1720s, but others have also been named. Early 19th-century research published by William Marshall provides logic and oral history to indicate a continuum between the locally produced cheese of Stilton, and the later development of a high turnover commercial industry importing cheese produced elsewhere, under local guidance. A recipe for a Stilton cheese was published in 1726 by Richard Bradley, later first Professor of Botany at Cambridge University.

In 1722, another early printed reference to Stilton cheese came from William Stukeley. Daniel Defoe in his 1724 work A Tour thro' the Whole Island of Great Britain notes, "We pass'd Stilton, a town famous for cheese, which is call'd our English Parmesan, and is brought to table with the mites or maggots round it, so thick, that they bring a spoon with them for you to eat the mites with, as you do the cheese."

According to the Stilton Cheesemaker's Association, the first person to market Blue Stilton cheese was Cooper Thornhill, owner of the Bell Inn on the Great North Road, in the village of Stilton, Huntingdonshire, now an administrative district of Cambridgeshire. Tradition has it that in 1730, Thornhill discovered a distinctive blue cheese while visiting a small farm near Melton Mowbray in rural Leicestershire – possibly Wymondham.

Thornhill fell in love with the cheese and made a business arrangement that granted the Bell Inn exclusive marketing rights to Blue Stilton. Soon thereafter, wagonloads of cheese were being delivered there. The village stood on the Great North Road, a main stagecoach route between London and Northern England, so that Thornhill could promote sales and the fame of Stilton spread rapidly.

In 1936, the Stilton Cheesemakers' Association (SCMA) was formed to lobby for regulation to protect the quality and origin of the cheese. In 1966 Stilton was granted legal protection via a certification trade mark, the only British cheese to have received that status.

Stilton was originally made from raw milk. In the late 1980s, production switched over to pasteurised milk after a health scare. After Stilton gained protected designation of origin status in 1996, cheese made from raw milk can no longer be sold under the Stilton name.

== Manufacture and PDO status ==
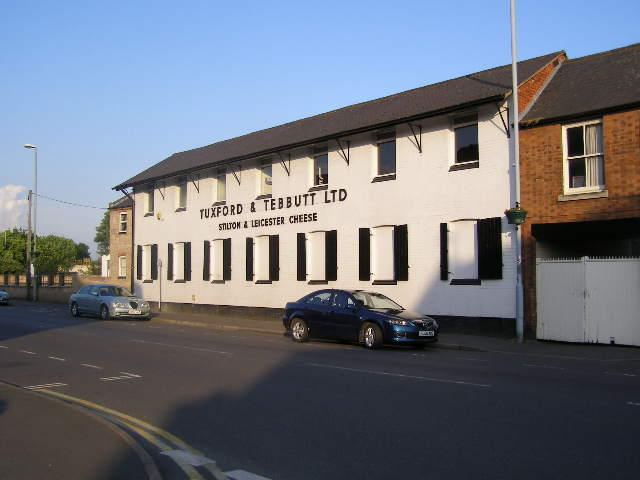
The Tuxford & Tebbutt creamery in Melton Mowbray which ended production in 2024

Blue Stilton's distinctive blue veins are created by piercing the crust of the cheese with stainless steel needles, allowing air into the core. The manufacturing and ripening process takes nine to twelve weeks.

For cheese to use the name "Stilton", it must be made in one of the three counties of Derbyshire, Leicestershire and Nottinghamshire and use pasteurised local milk. Manufacturers of Stilton in these counties received protection under European Law as a protected designation of origin (PDO) in 1996. The cheese remains protected by its PDO even after Brexit, under EU law (in the EU and Northern Ireland) and under UK law (England, Scotland and Wales).

By September 2016, just six dairies were licensed to make Stilton – three in Leicestershire, two in Nottinghamshire, and one in Derbyshire – each being subject to regular audit by an independent inspection agency accredited to European Standard EN 45011. Four of the licensed dairies were based in the Vale of Belvoir, which straddles the Nottinghamshire/Leicestershire/Lincolnshire borders. This area is commonly seen as the heartland of Stilton production, with dairies located in the town of Melton Mowbray and the villages of Colston Bassett, Cropwell Bishop, Long Clawson and Saxelbye.

Another Leicestershire dairy was in the grounds of Quenby Hall near the village of Hungarton, outside the generally accepted boundaries of the Vale of Belvoir. Quenby Hall restarted Stilton production in a new dairy in August 2005 (the old dairy dated back to the 18th century) but the business folded in 2011.

Stilton cheese has been made in Derbyshire since 1900, originally at Hartington. The former Dairy Crest-owned licensed dairy that produced the product at Hartington was acquired by the Long Clawson dairy in 2008 and closed in 2009, with its production transferred to Leicestershire. Two former employees set up the Hartington Creamery at Pikehall in Hartington parish, which was licensed in 2014. Three additional partners soon joined them and this business is the smallest of the six companies licensed to make Stilton.

As of March 2021, Hartington Stilton was marketing within the UK but also exporting to the US and to the EU; it had just started exporting to Canada. The company director told the BBC that they had "a surge in interest and consumer sales from the US" but it had to stop sales to the European Union following Brexit because of the cost of a veterinary surgeon certificate.

Stilton cheese cannot be made in Stilton village, which gave the cheese its name, because it is not in any of the three permitted counties, but rather in the administrative county of Cambridgeshire and the historic county of Huntingdonshire. The Original Cheese Company applied to Defra to amend the Stilton PDO to include the village, but the application was rejected in 2013.

Stilton cheese was also manufactured in Staffordshire. The Nuttall family of Beeby, Leicestershire opened a Stilton cheese factory in Uttoxeter in 1892 to take advantage of the local milk and good transport links. However, this firm did not last long and the site became a general dairy.

== Protected characteristics ==
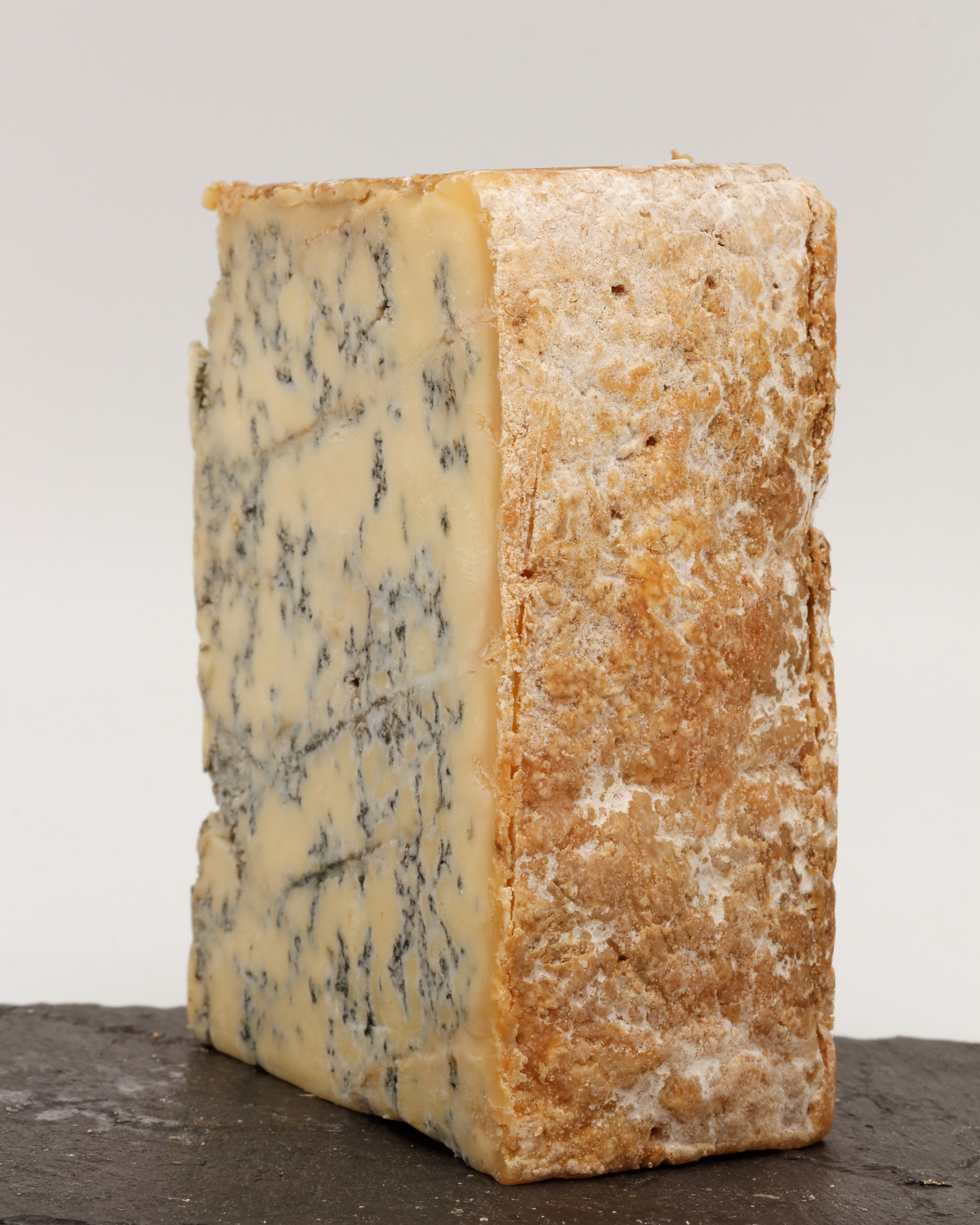
Slice of a Blue Stilton, viewed from the rind side, showing inoculation holes

To be labelled as "Blue Stilton" in the EU, a cheese must:

- be made specifically in the counties of Derbyshire, Leicestershire or Nottinghamshire
- if possible, use exclusively locally produced and pasteurised milk
- have the traditional cylindrical shape
- form its own crust or coat
- be unpressed
- contain blue veins radiating from the centre
- have a "taste profile typical of Stilton"
- and have a minimum of 48% milk fat in the dry matter

In the event of a local milk shortage, milk can be sourced from the surrounding counties of Cambridgeshire, Northamptonshire, Warwickshire, Staffordshire, Greater Manchester, Cheshire, Yorkshire, or Lincolnshire.

Finished Stilton cheese has a typical fat content of 35% and a protein content of 23%.

== Similar cheeses ==
A number of blue cheeses are made in a way similar to Blue Stilton. These gain their blue veins and distinct flavour from the use of one or more saprotrophic fungi, such as Penicillium roqueforti and Penicillium glaucum. Since the PDO came into effect, some British supermarkets have stocked a generic "British Blue cheese". Other makers have adopted their own names and styles.

Other typical British blue cheeses are Oxford Blue and Shropshire Blue. Stichelton is an English blue cheese virtually identical to Blue Stilton but, because it does not use pasteurised milk, it cannot legally be called Stilton, due its PDO status.

Many countries have blue cheeses. Italy, for example, has greenish blue Gorgonzola made from cow's milk. France has blue cheeses such as Fourme d'Ambert from Auvergne, made with cow's milk, and Roquefort, made with ewe's milk. Denmark produces Danish Blue Cheese. Some of the many cheeses in the Netherlands are blue, such as Ruscello.

== Consumption ==
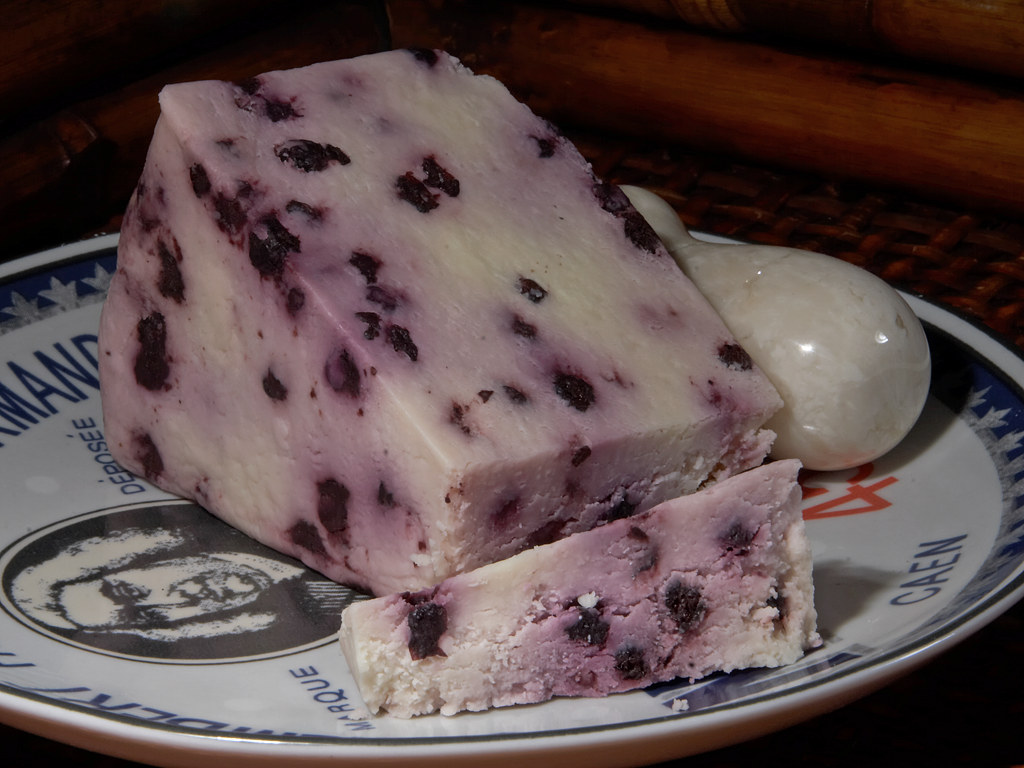
Blueberry White Stilton

Blue Stilton is often eaten with celery or pears. It is commonly added as a flavouring to vegetable soup, notably to cream of celery or broccoli. It is otherwise eaten with crackers, biscuits or bread. It can be used to make a blue cheese sauce to be served drizzled over a steak, or the cheese can be crumbled over a salad.

Traditionally, a barley wine or port is paired with Blue Stilton. It also goes well with sweet sherry or Madeira wine. The practice of scooping a hollow in the centre of a Stilton cheese and pouring port wine into it is deprecated; nonetheless this combination has been marketed in screw-topped tubes "like toothpaste".

White Stilton does not have the Penicillium roqueforti mould introduced into it, which would lead to the blue veining normally associated with Stilton. It is a crumbly, creamy, open-textured cheese now extensively used as a base for blending with apricot, ginger and citrus or vine fruits to create dessert cheeses. It has also been used as a flavouring for chocolate.

Huntsman cheese is made with both Blue Stilton and Double Gloucester.

The cheese is traditionally eaten at Christmas.

== Cultural influence ==
English author G. K. Chesterton wrote several essays on cheese, specifically on the absence of cheese in art. In one of these he recalls a time when he happened to visit a small town in the fenlands of England, which turned out to be Stilton. His experience in Stilton left a deep impression on him, which he expressed through poetry in his "Sonnet to a Stilton Cheese":

Stilton, thou shouldst be living at this hour
And so thou art. Nor losest grace thereby;
England has need of thee, and so have I —
She is a Fen. Far as the eye can scour,
League after grassy league from Lincoln tower
To Stilton in the fields, she is a Fen.
Yet this high cheese, by choice of fenland men,
Like a tall green volcano rose in power.
Plain living and long drinking are no more,
And pure religion reading Household Words,
And sturdy manhood sitting still all day
Shrink, like this cheese that crumbles to its core;
While my digestion, like the House of Lords,
The heaviest burdens on herself doth lay.

This is in part a parody of William Wordsworth's sonnet "London, 1802", the opening line of which was "Milton! thou shouldst be living at this hour."

George Orwell wrote an essay, "In Defence of English Cooking", first published in the Evening Standard on 15 December 1945. While enumerating the high points of British cuisine, he touches on Stilton: "Then there are the English cheeses. There are not many of them, but I fancy that Stilton is the best cheese of its type in the world, with Wensleydale not far behind."

The Stilton Cheese Makers Association produced a fragrance called Eau de Stilton, which was "very different to the very sweet perfumes you smell wafting down the street as someone walks past you."

The search for an unpasteurised Stilton cheese was a plot element of a Chef! episode titled "The Big Cheese", aired on BBC1 on 25 February 1993.

A character named G. D'Arcy "Stilton" Cheesewright appears in several of the Jeeves novels of P. G. Wodehouse.

Stilton gives its name to Geronimo Stilton, the mouse who is the title character in the Italian children's book series of the same name created by Elisabetta Dami. Over 300 books have been published in the series, many of which have also appeared in English translation.

== See also ==
- List of British cheeses
- Oxford Blue (cheese)
