= Saga (cheese) =

Danish cheese

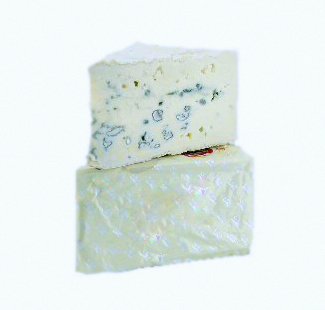
- Soft and creamy Saga cheese
- Country of origin: Denmark
- Texture: soft

Saga cheese originated in Denmark and is a mix of blue cheese and brie. It is a creamy, blue-veined cheese with a white-mould rind. Saga is a very mild blue-veined cheese. It comes with a delicate blue mold, that may not appear in other varieties of blue cheeses. It is aged for more than 60 days. Saga Blue cheese pairs nicely with white Riesling wines or hearty red wines.

The Saga family of cheeses includes blue, blue brie, camembert, creamy brie, and Gorgonzola. Saga cheese is also largely produced and sold in America. Arla Foods is one of the largest Saga cheese producers in Denmark.

== Ingredients ==
- Milk
- Sodium chloride
- Cheese culture
- Rennet

== See also ==
- Danish cuisine
