= Saint Agur Blue =

Pasteurized blue cheese from central France

Saint Agur
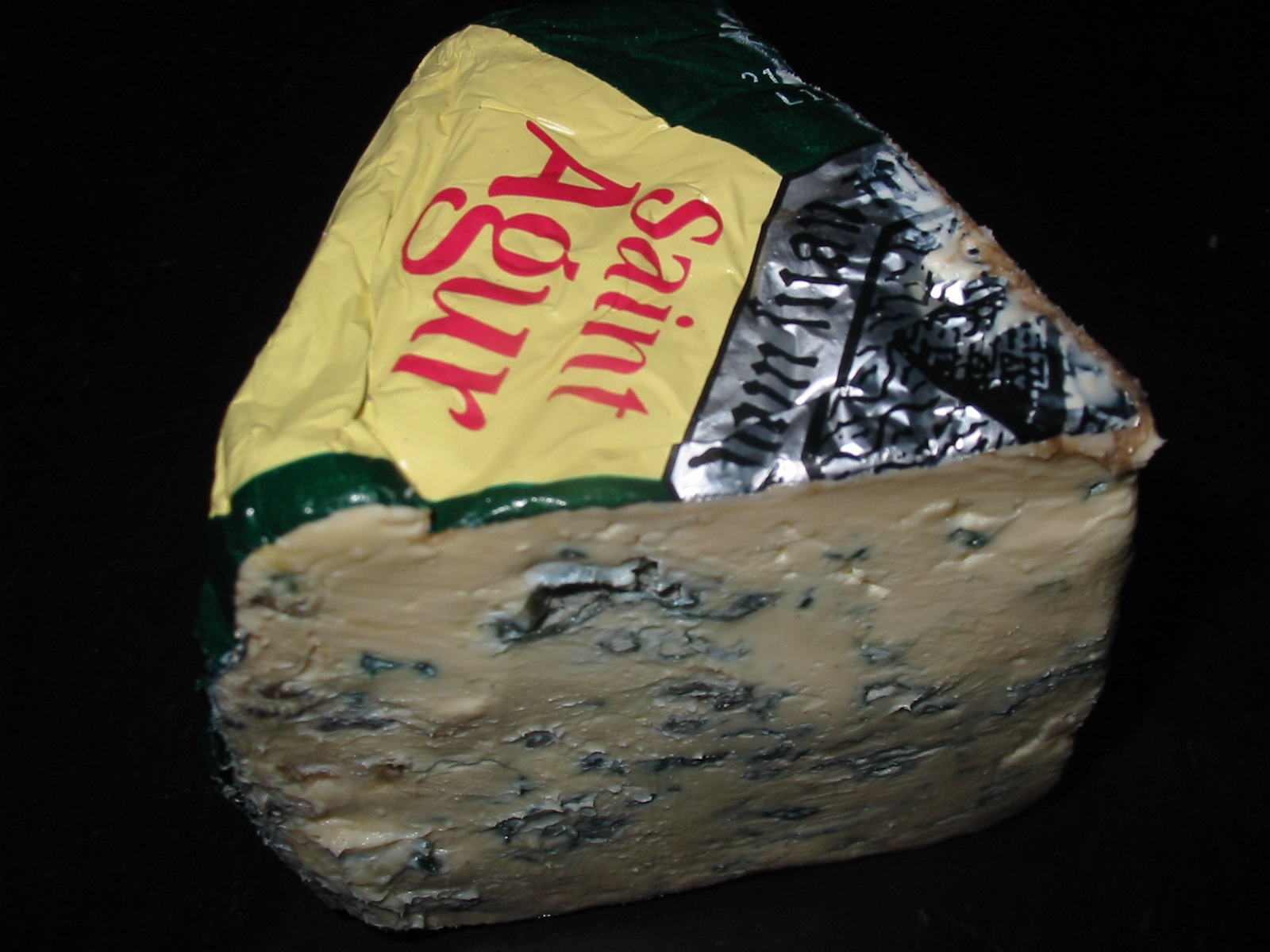
- Country of origin: France
- Region, town: Auvergne, Monts du Velay
- Source of milk: Cow
- Pasteurised: Yes
- Texture: Soft
- Aging time: 2 months
- Certification: Unknown

Saint Agur (pronounced [sɛ̃taɡyʁ]; Occitan: Sant Agur) is a blue cheese brand owned by Savencia Fromage & Dairy Group and made with pasteurised cow's milk from the village of Beauzac in the Monts du Velay, part of the mountainous Auvergne region of central France. It is made from pasteurised cow's milk, enriched with cream, and contains 60% butterfat, qualifying it as a double-cream cheese. Aged for 60 days in cellars, the cheese becomes stronger and spicier as it ages.

The moist, rich, white cheese has characteristic olive green mould veins throughout and a smooth, creamy texture with a subtle mild spicy taste resembling a softer and finer Roquefort in presentation and taste. It is not as salty as more traditional blue cheese, and its tangy and creamy nature is balanced so as not to overpower with a sharp bite, although this is dependent on the age of the cheese. Owing to its double-cream nature, this cheese is easily spread and also melts well.

Saint Agur is produced in 2 kg (4.4 lb) octagonal prisms, rendering a shape that makes it easy to cut into wedges. It has no rind and sometimes comes in foil to prevent the cheese from becoming more blue.

== See also ==
- List of cheeses
