= Dolcelatte =

Italian cheese

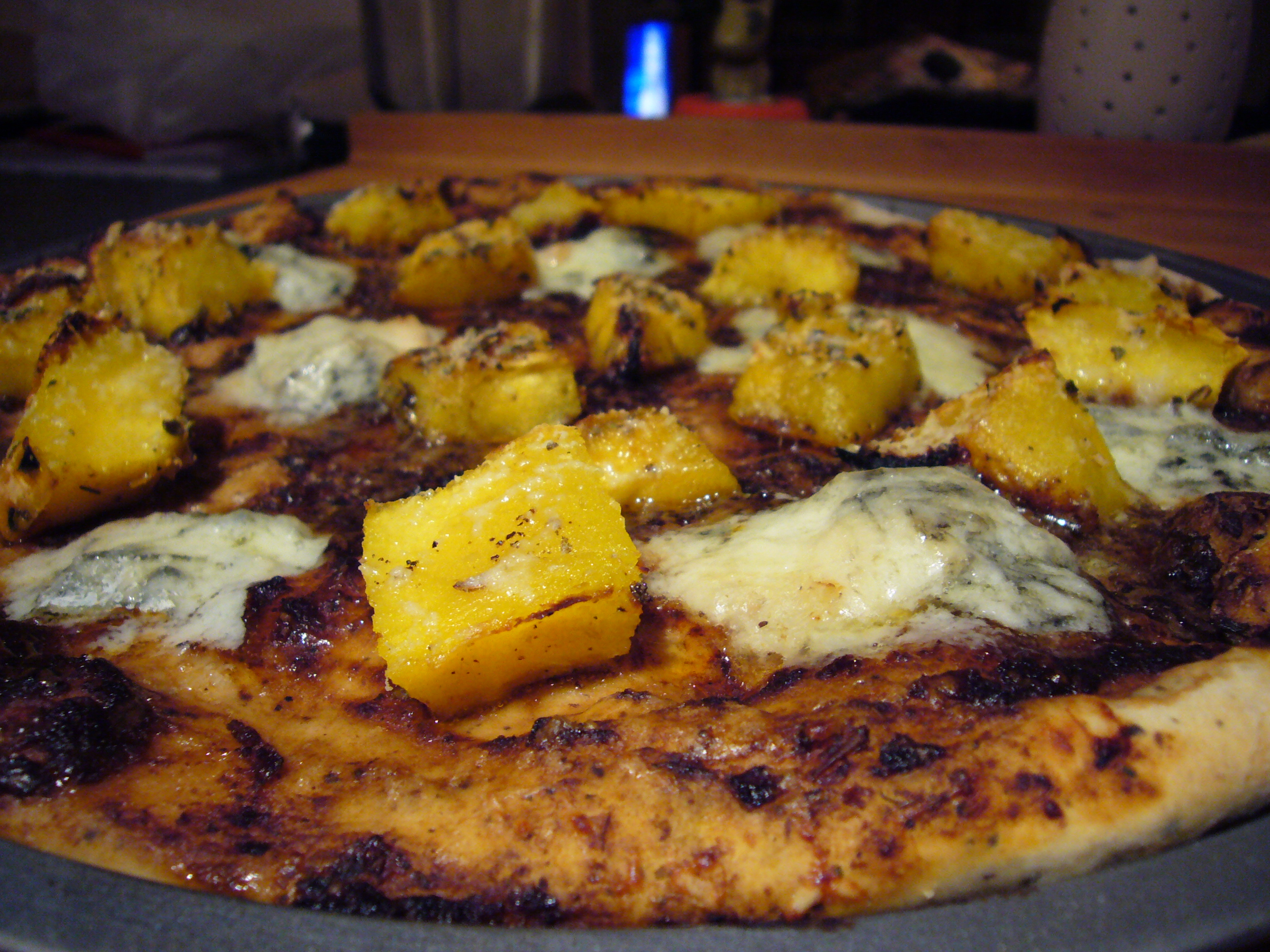
Pizza topped with acorn squash and dolcelatte

Dolcelatte (UK: /ˌdɒltʃɪˈlɑːteɪ, -ti, -ˈlæti/, Italian: [ˌdoltʃeˈlatte]; 'sweet milk') is a blue veined Italian soft cheese. The cheese is made from cow's milk and has a sweet taste.

Dolcelatte was created circa. 1960 by the Galbani Company (now part of Groupe Lactalis) and the name is a registered trademark. Dolcelatte was developed for the British market to provide a milder smelling and tasting alternative to the famous traditional Italian blue cheese, Gorgonzola.

The production method for dolcelatte is similar to the methods used to make Gorgonzola. One difference is that it is made from the curd of only one milking, which makes it harder. It takes about two to three months to produce and age this cheese. The fat content of dolcelatte is higher than Gorgonzola at about 50%. Dolcelatte is comparable in taste and texture to dolceverde and torte gaudenzio cheese.

== See also ==
- List of Italian cheeses
