= Danish Blue Cheese =

Blue-veined cheese from Denmark

Danablu
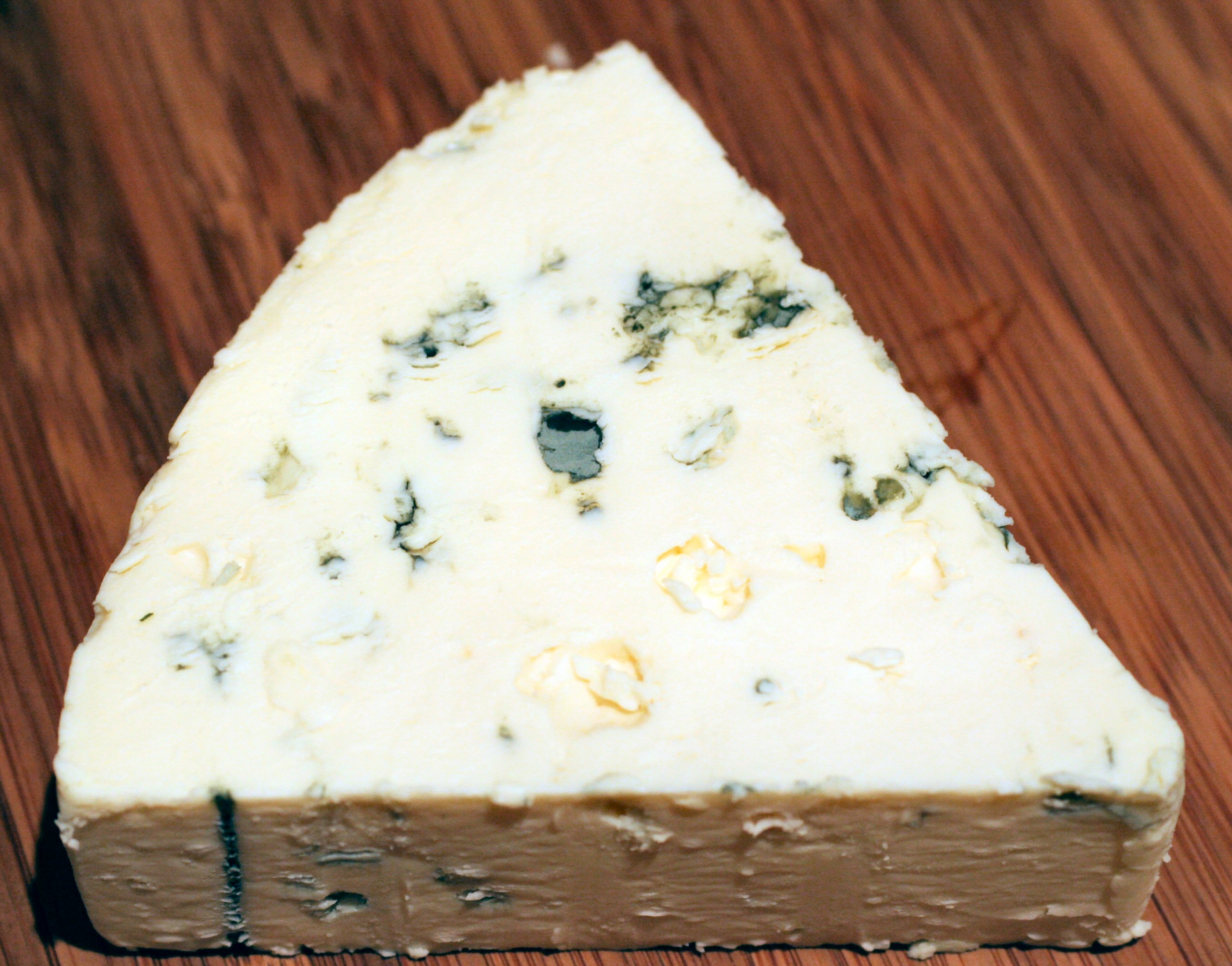
- Other names: Danish Blue
- Country of origin: Denmark
- Source of milk: Cows
- Texture: Semi-soft
- Aging time: 8–12 weeks
- Certification: Danablu: PGI

Danablu, often marketed under the trademark Danish Blue Cheese within North America, is a strong, blue-veined cheese. This semi-soft creamy cheese is typically drum- or block-shaped and has a yellowish, slightly moist, edible rind. Made from full fat cow's milk and homogenized cream, it has a fat content of 25–30% (50–60% in dry matter) and is aged for eight to twelve weeks.

Before ageing, copper wires or rods are used to pierce the formed curds to distribute the mould (Penicillium roqueforti) evenly through the cheese. The holes can still be seen when the finished wheel is cut open.

Danablu was developed early in the 20th century by a Danish cheese maker named Marius Boel with the intention of emulating a Roquefort-style cheese. Danablu has a milder flavor characterised by a sharp, salty taste, and is often served crumbled on salads or as a dessert cheese with fruit. In Denmark, it is often served on bread or savory biscuits.

Danablu, Danbo, Esrom and Havarti are the only four Danish cheeses that are PGI-marked by the EU, meaning that they may be produced only in Denmark from Danish milk and at approved dairies that produce the cheeses according to the specifications laid down.

== See also ==
- Blue cheese
- Danish cuisine
- List of cheeses
- Castello Blue
- Saga
- Norwegian types:
  - Kraftkar
  - Norzola
