= Blue cheese =

Cheese with blue veins of mold

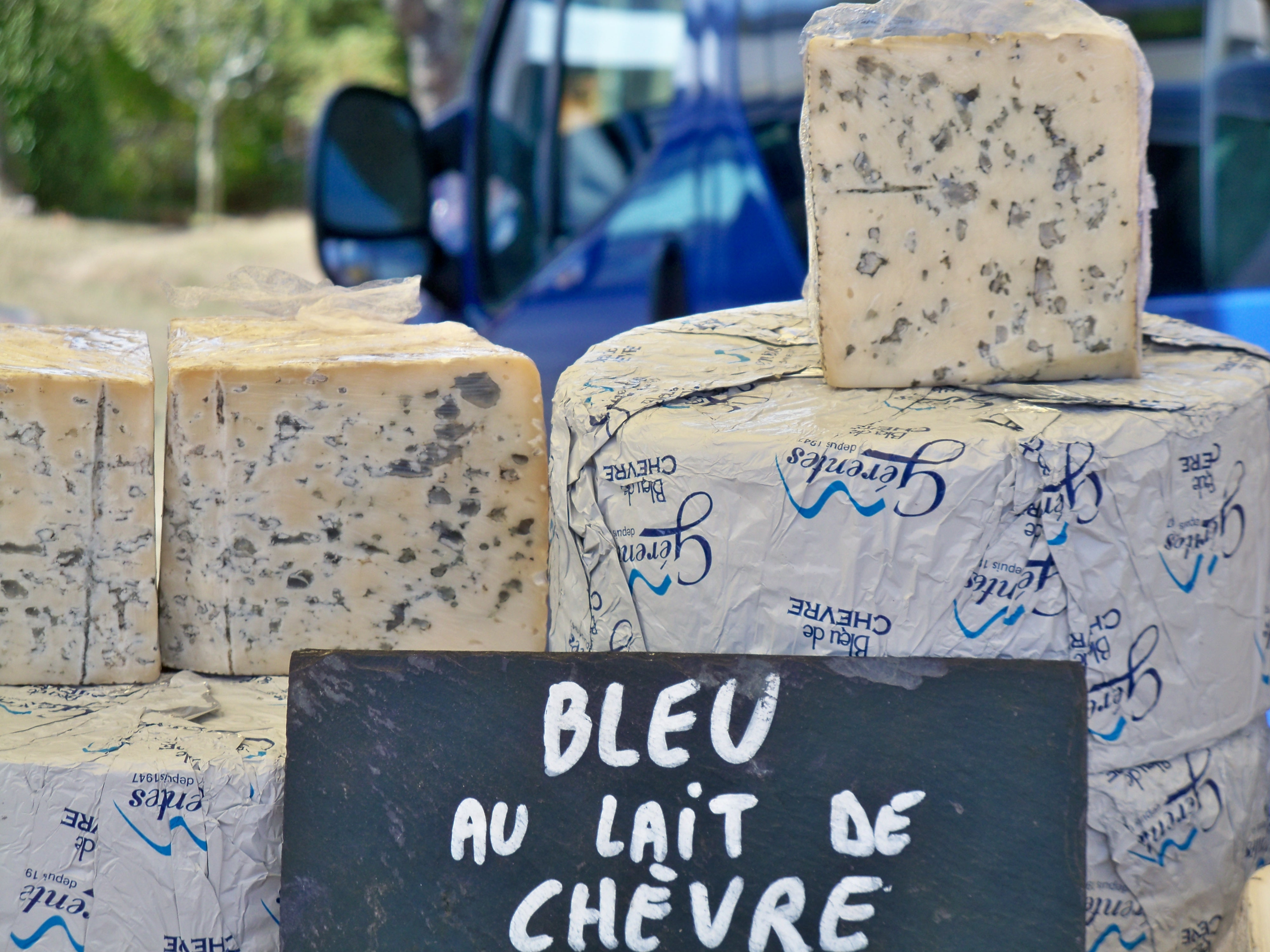
Blue goat cheese

Blue cheese is any cheese made with the addition of cultures of edible molds, which create blue-green spots or veins through the cheese. Blue cheeses vary in flavor from mild to strong and from slightly sweet to salty or sharp; in color from pale to dark; and in consistency from liquid to hard. They may have a distinctive smell, either from the mold or from various specially cultivated bacteria such as Brevibacterium linens.

Some blue cheeses are injected with spores before the curds form, and others have spores mixed in with the curds after they form. Blue cheeses are typically aged in temperature-controlled environments.

== History ==
Blue cheese is believed to have been discovered by accident when cheeses were stored in caves with naturally controlled temperature and moisture levels which happened to be favorable environments for varieties of harmless mold. Analysis of paleofeces sampled in the salt mines of Hallstatt, Austria showed that miners of the Hallstatt Period (800 to 400 BC) already consumed blue cheese and beer.

According to legend, one of the first blue cheeses, Roquefort, was discovered when a young boy, eating bread and ewes' milk cheese, abandoned his meal in a nearby cave after seeing a beautiful girl in the distance. When he returned months later, the mold (Penicillium roqueforti) had transformed his cheese into Roquefort.

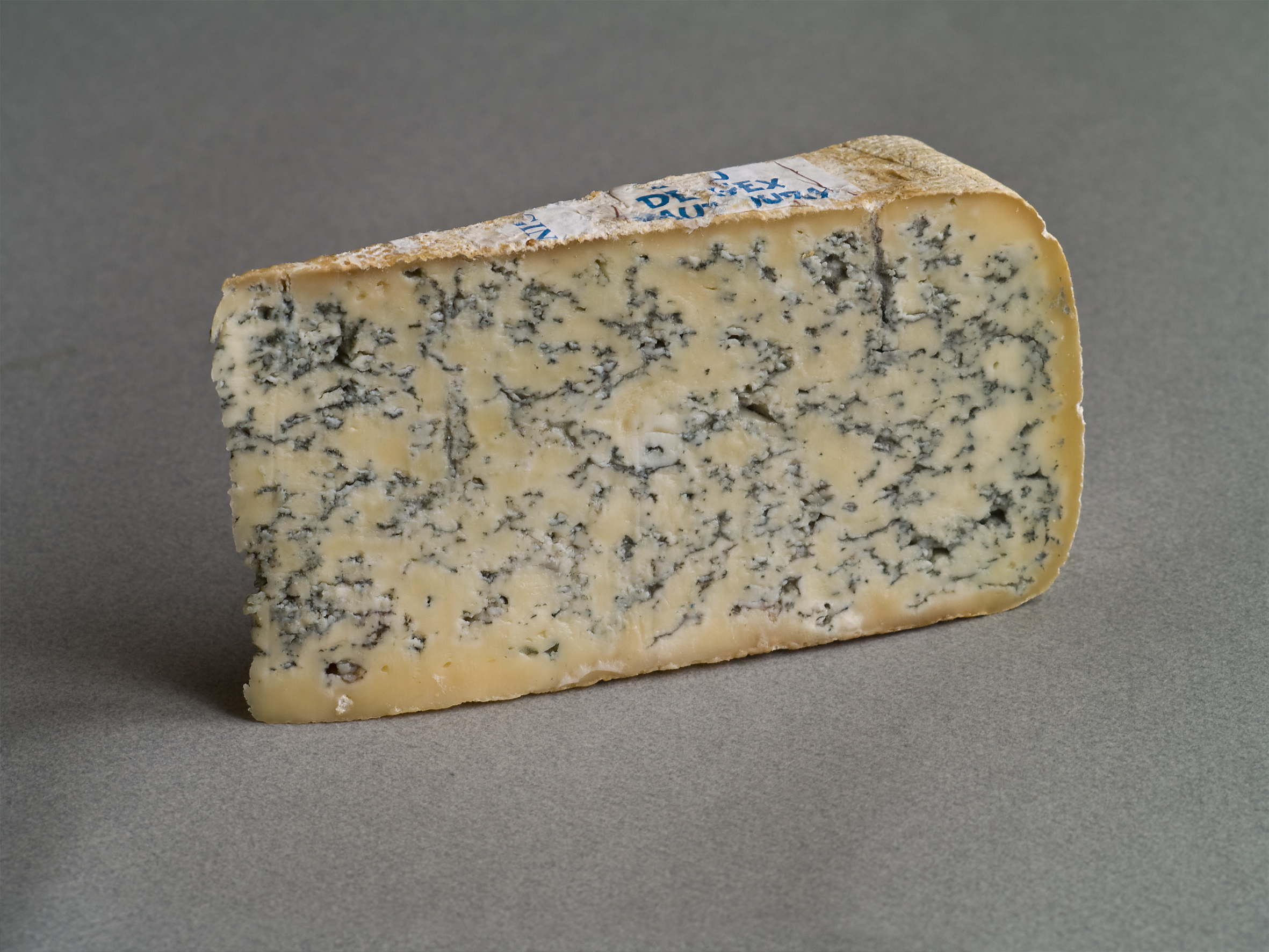
Bleu de Gex, a creamy, semi-soft blue cheese made in the Jura region of France

Gorgonzola is one of the oldest known blue cheeses, having been created around AD 879, though it is said that it did not contain blue veins until around the 11th century. Stilton is a relatively new addition, becoming popular sometime in the early 1700s. Many varieties of blue cheese originated subsequently, such as the 20th century Danablu and Cambozola, which were an attempt to fill the demand for Roquefort-style cheeses.

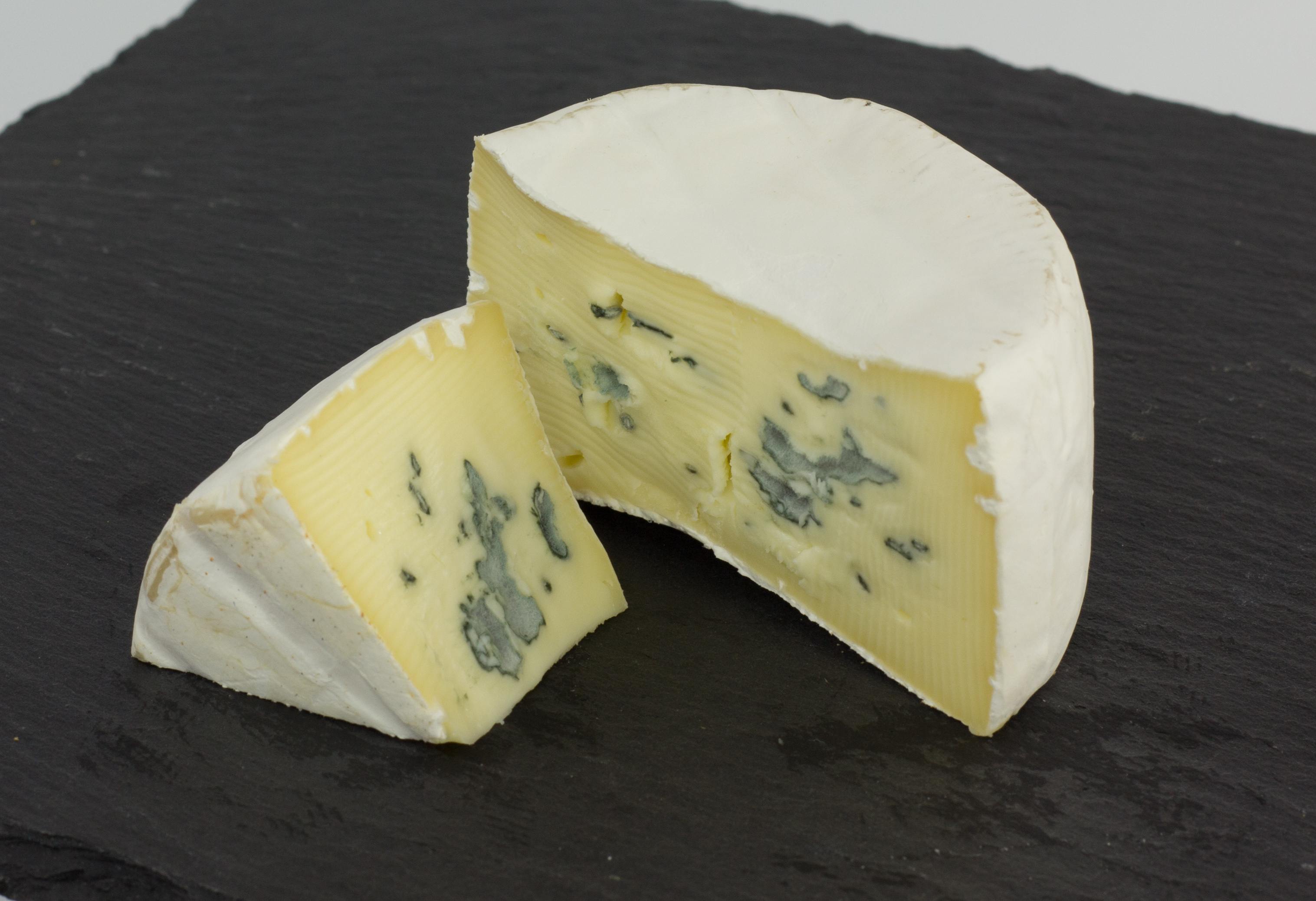
Cambozola, a German variety of blue cheese

== Production ==
Similar to other varieties of cheese, the process of making blue cheese consists of six standard steps. However, additional ingredients and processes are required to give this blue cheese its distinctive properties. To begin with, the commercial-scale production of blue cheese consists of two phases: the culturing of suitable spore-rich inocula and fermentation for maximum, typical flavor.

=== Penicillium roqueforti inoculum ===
In the first phase of production, a Penicillium roqueforti inoculum is prepared prior to the actual production of blue cheese. Multiple methods can be used to achieve this. However, all methods involve the use of a freeze-dried Penicillium roqueforti culture. Although Penicillium roqueforti can be found naturally, cheese producers use commercially manufactured Penicillium roqueforti. First, Penicillium roqueforti is washed from a pure culture agar plate which is later frozen. Through the freeze-drying process, water from the frozen state is evaporated without the transition through the liquid state (sublimation). This retains the value of the culture and is activated upon the addition of water.

Salt, sugar or both are added to autoclaved, homogenized milk via a sterile solution. This mixture is then inoculated with Penicillium roqueforti. This solution is first incubated for three to four days at 21–25 °C (70–77 °F). More salt and/or sugar is added and then aerobic incubation is continued for an additional one to two days. Alternatively, sterilized, homogenized milk and reconstituted non-fat solids or whey solids are mixed with sterile salt to create a fermentation medium. A spore-rich Penicillium roqueforti culture is then added. Next, modified milk fat is added which consists of milk fat with calf pre-gastric esterase. This solution is prepared in advance by an enzyme hydrolysis of a milk fat emulsion. The addition of modified milk fat stimulates a progressive release of free fatty acids via lipase action which is essential for rapid flavor development in blue cheese. This inoculum produced by either methods is later added to the cheese curds.

=== Production and fermentation ===
First, raw milk (either from cattle, goats or sheep) is mixed and pasteurized at 72 °C (162 °F) for 15 seconds. Then, acidification occurs: a starter culture, such as Streptococcus lactis, is added in order to change lactose to lactic acid, thus changing the acidity of the milk and turning it from liquid to solid. The next step is coagulation, where rennet, a mixture of rennin and other materials found in the stomach lining of a calf is added to solidify the milk further. Following this, thick curds are cut typically with a knife to encourage the release of liquid or whey. The smaller the curds are cut, the thicker and harder the resulting cheese will become.

After the curds have been ladled into containers in order to be drained and formed into a full wheel of cheese, the Penicillium roqueforti inoculum is sprinkled on top of the curds along with Brevibacterium linens. Then, the curd granules are knitted in molds to form cheese loaves with a relatively open texture. Next, whey drainage continues for 10–48 hours in which no pressure is applied, but the molds are inverted frequently to promote this process. Salt is then added to provide flavor as well as to act as a preservative so the cheese does not spoil through the process of brine salting or dry salting for 24–48 hours. The final step is ripening the cheese by aging it. When the cheese is freshly made, there is little to no blue cheese flavor development. Usually, a fermentation period of 60–90 days is needed before the flavor of the cheese is typical and acceptable for marketing.

During this ripening period, the temperature and the level of humidity in the room where the cheese is aging is monitored to ensure the cheese does not spoil or lose its optimal flavor and texture. In general, the ripening temperature is around 8–10 degrees Celsius with a relative humidity of 85–95%, but this may differ according to the type of cheese being produced. At the beginning of this ripening process, the cheese loaves are punctured to create small openings to allow air to penetrate and support the growth of the aerobic Penicillium roqueforti cultures, thereby encouraging the formation of blue veins.

Throughout the ripening process, the total ketone content is constantly monitored as the distinctive flavor and aroma of blue cheese arises from methyl ketones (including 2-pentanone, 2-heptanone, and 2-nonanone) which are a metabolic product of Penicillium roqueforti.

=== Toxins from the production of blue cheese ===
Penicillium roqueforti, responsible for the greenish blue moldy aspect of blue cheese, produces several mycotoxins. While mycotoxins like roquefortine, isofumigaclavine A, mycophenolic acid and ferrichrome are present at low levels, penicillic acid and PR toxin are unstable in the cheese. Because of the instability of PR toxin and lack of optimal environmental conditions (temperature, aeration) for the production of PR toxin and roquefortine, health hazards due to Penicillium roqueforti metabolites are considerably reduced. Additionally, mycotoxin contamination occurs at low levels and large quantities of cheese are rarely consumed, suggesting that hazard to human health is unlikely.

== Physicochemical properties ==
=== Structure ===
The main structure of the blue cheese comes from the aggregation of the casein. In milk, casein does not aggregate because of the outer layer of the particle, called the "hairy layer." The hairy layer consists of κ-casein, which are strings of polypeptides that extend outward from the center of the casein micelle. The entanglement of the hairy layer between casein micelles decreases the entropy of the system because it constrains the micelles, preventing them from spreading out. Curds form, however, due to the function that the enzyme, rennet, plays in removing the hairy layer in the casein micelle. Rennet is an enzyme that cleaves the κ-casein off the casein micelle, thus removing the strain that occurs when the hairy layer entangles. The casein micelles are then able to aggregate together when they collide with each other, forming the curds that can then be made into blue cheese.

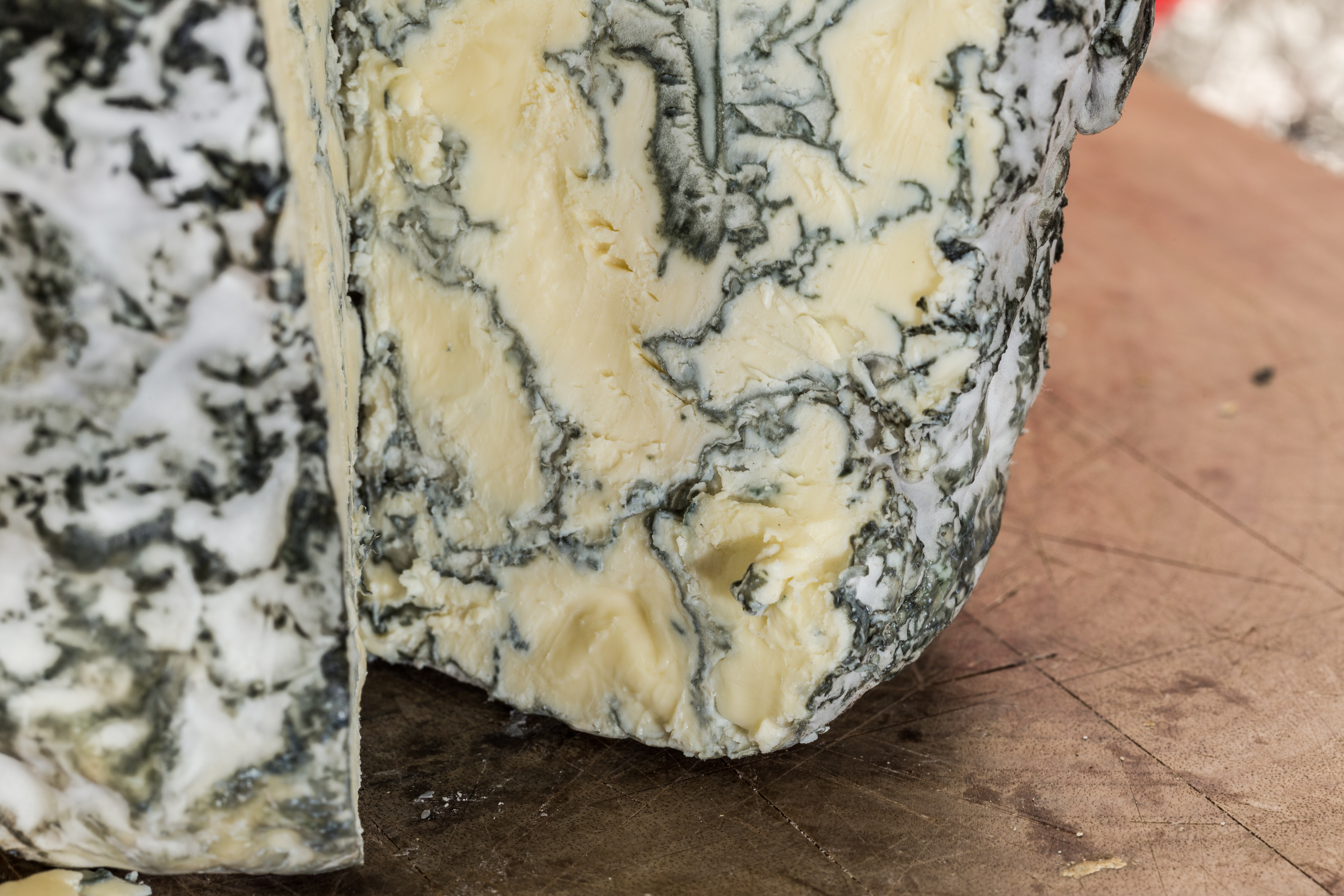
Characteristic blue veins in blue cheese

=== Mold growth ===
Penicillium roqueforti and Penicillium glaucum are both molds that require the presence of oxygen to grow. Therefore, initial fermentation of the cheese is done by lactic acid bacteria. The lactic acid bacteria, however, are killed by the low pH and the secondary fermenters, Penicillium roqueforti, take over and break the lactic acid down, maintaining a pH in the aged cheese above 6.0. As the pH rises again from the loss of lactic acid, the enzymes in the molds responsible for lipolysis and proteolysis are more active and can continue to ferment the cheese because they are optimal at a pH of 6.0.

Penicillium roqueforti creates the characteristic blue veins in blue cheese after the aged curds have been pierced, forming air tunnels in the cheese. When given oxygen, the mold is able to grow along the surface of the curd-air interface. The veins along the blue cheese are also responsible for the aroma of blue cheese itself. In fact, one type of bacteria in blue cheese, Brevibacterium linens, is the same bacteria responsible for foot and body odor. B. linens was previously thought to give cheeses their distinct orangish pigmentation, but studies show this not to be the case and blue cheese is an example of the lack of that orange pigmentation. In pressing the cheese, the curds are not tightly packed in order to allow for air gaps between them. After piercing, the mold can also grow in between the curds.

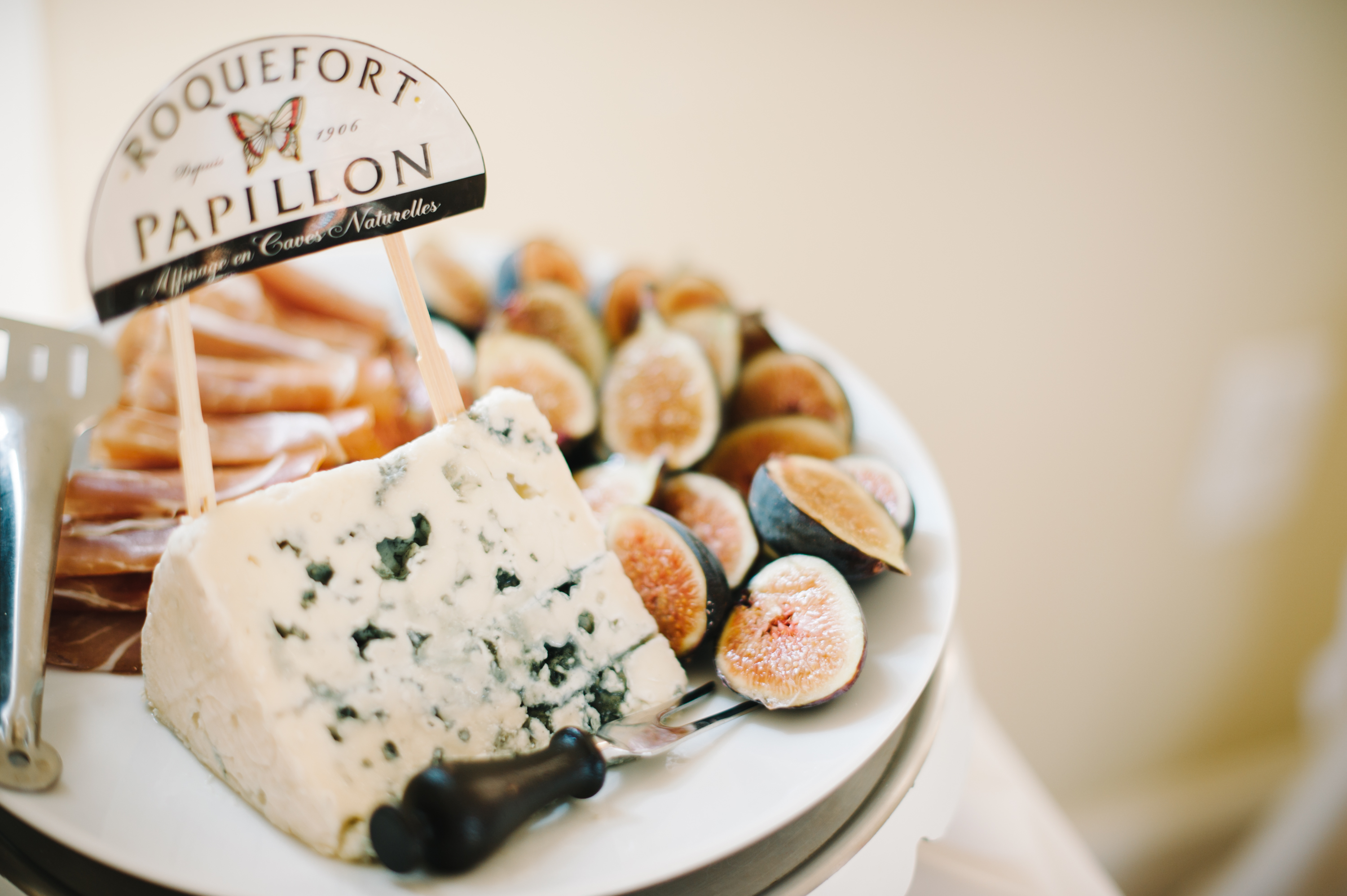
Blue cheese platter

=== Flavour ===
A portion of the distinct flavour comes from lipolysis (breakdown of fat). The metabolism of the blue mold further breaks down fatty acids to form ketones to give blue cheese a richer flavour and aroma.

== Regulation ==
=== European Union ===
In the European Union, many blue cheeses, such as Cabrales, Danablu, Gorgonzola, Roquefort and Blue Stilton, carry a protected designation of origin, meaning they can bear the name only if they have been made in a particular region. Similarly, individual countries have protections of their own such as France's Appellation d'Origine Contrôlée and Italy's Denominazione di Origine Protetta. Blue cheeses with no protected origin name are designated simply "blue cheese".

=== Canada ===
Under the regulation of the Canadian Food Inspection Agency, manufacturers can produce blue cheese with a maximum of 47 percent moisture and minimum of 27 percent milk fat. Salt is allowed to be used as a preservative; however, the amount of the salt or combination of salts shall not exceed 200 parts per million of milk and milk products used to make the cheese. The Canadian Food Inspection Agency does not limit the use of bacterial cultures to aid further ripening and flavoring preparations other than cheese flavoring.

=== United States ===
The United States Code of Federal Regulations standard for blue cheese specifies a minimum milkfat content of 50 percent, and maximum moisture of 46 percent. Optional ingredients permitted include food coloring to neutralize the yellowish tint of the cheese, benzoyl peroxide bleach, and vegetable wax for coating the rind.

== Properties ==
Gorgonzola, Stilton, and Roquefort are considered to be favored blue cheeses in many countries. These cheeses all have a protected designation of origin: they may only use the name if produced following regulations about the process used and the region of production.

=== Gorgonzola ===
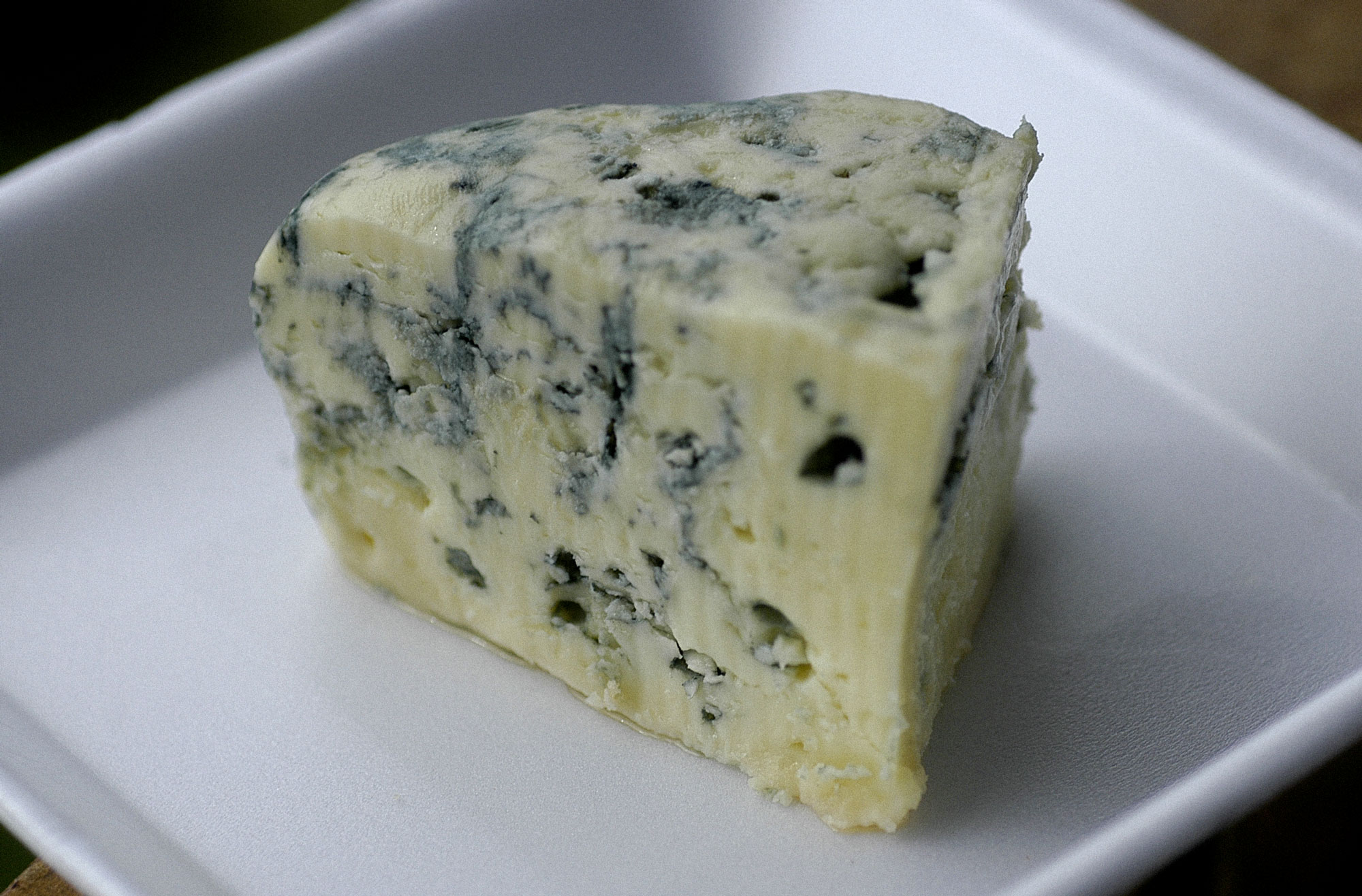
Gorgonzola cheese

Gorgonzola blue cheese takes its name from the village of Gorgonzola in Italy where it was first made. Belonging to the family of Stracchino cheeses, Gorgonzola is a whole milk, white, and "uncooked" cheese. This blue cheese is inoculated with Penicillium glaucum which, during ripening, produces the characteristic of blue-green veins. There are two variants with different odor: natural and creamy Gorgonzola. 63 components in natural Gorgonzola cheese and 52 components in creamy Gorgonzola cheese contribute to odor with 2-nonanone, 1-octen-3-ol, 2-heptanol, ethyl hexanoate, methylanisole and 2-heptanone being the prominent compounds for odor in both cheeses.

=== Stilton ===
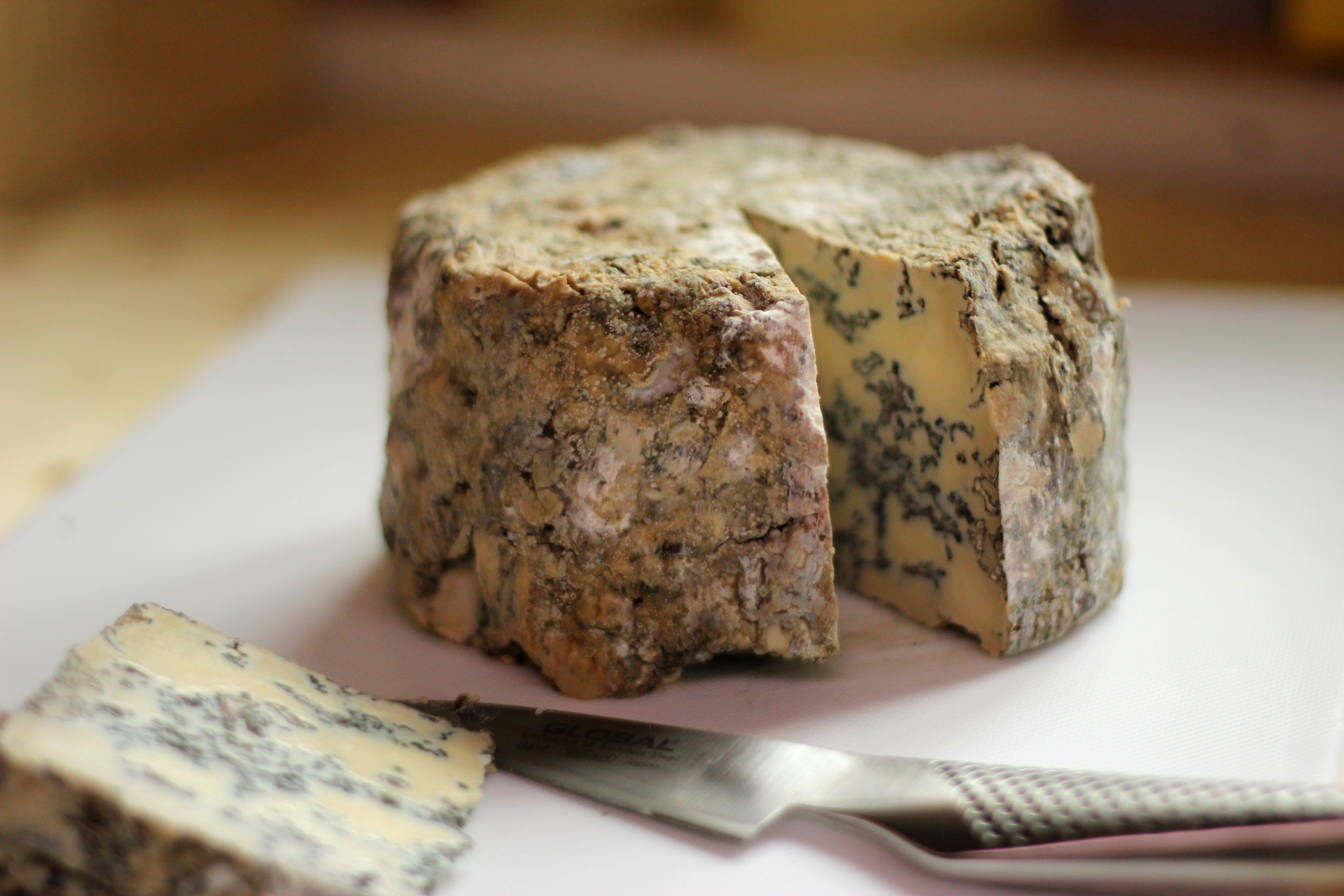
Stilton blue cheese

Stilton blue cheese was first sold in the village of Stilton in England, but there is little evidence it was ever made there. Stilton cheese is made from pasteurized milk; a similar, less commonly found, blue cheese made from raw milk and without factory-produced rennet is Stichelton. In addition to being inoculated with Penicillium roqueforti to give it the blue vein characteristic, research has shown that other microbiota which are relatives of Lactococcus lactis, Enterococcus faecalis, Lactobacillus plantarum, Latilactobacillus curvatus, Leuconostoc mesenteroides, Staphylococcus equorum, and Staphylococcus sp. can also be found in blue Stilton cheese. Some important microbiota contribute to the aromatic profile such as those of the Lactobacillus genus due to their production of volatile compounds. During ripening, free fatty acids increase in amount, which contributes to the characteristic flavor of blue cheeses due to fat breakdown by Penicillium roqueforti. There is also uninoculated white Stilton cheese.

=== Roquefort ===
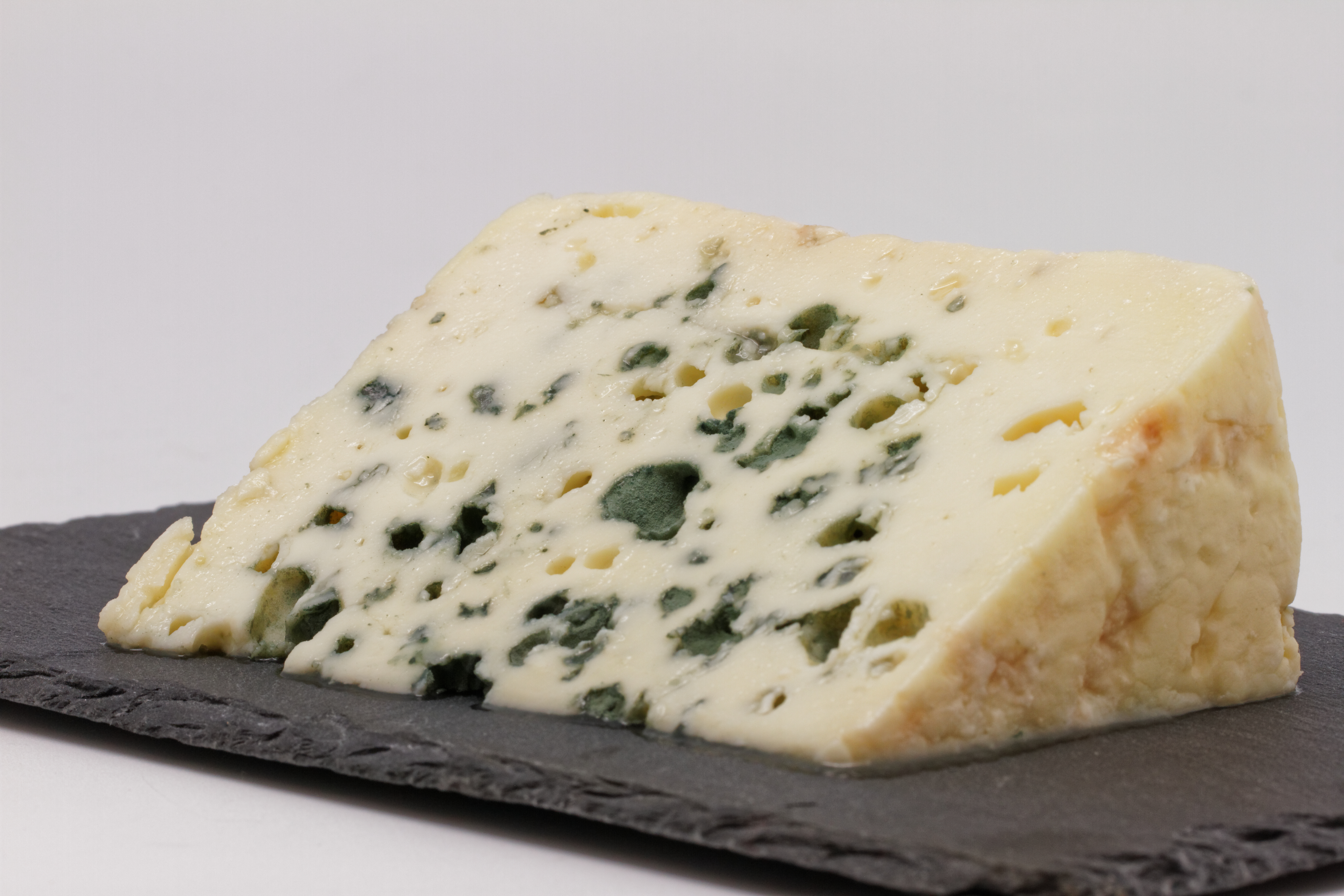
Roquefort cheese

Roquefort blue cheese comes from the village of Roquefort-sur-Soulzon, France. Its flavors come from the use of unpasteurized sheep's milk, inoculation with Penicillium roqueforti, and the particular conditions of the natural caves of Roquefort-sur-Soulzon in which they are ripened. Penicillium roqueforti is the cause of the blue veins in Roquefort cheese. Various yeasts are also present, namely Debaryomyces hansenii and its non-sporulating form Candida famata, and Kluyveromyces lactis and its non-sporulating form Candida sphaerica. As with other blue cheeses, Roquefort's flavor and odor come from a mixture of methyl ketones such as 2-heptanone, 2-pentanone, and 2-nonanone.

== See also ==
- List of blue cheeses
- Blue cheese dressing

== Gallery ==
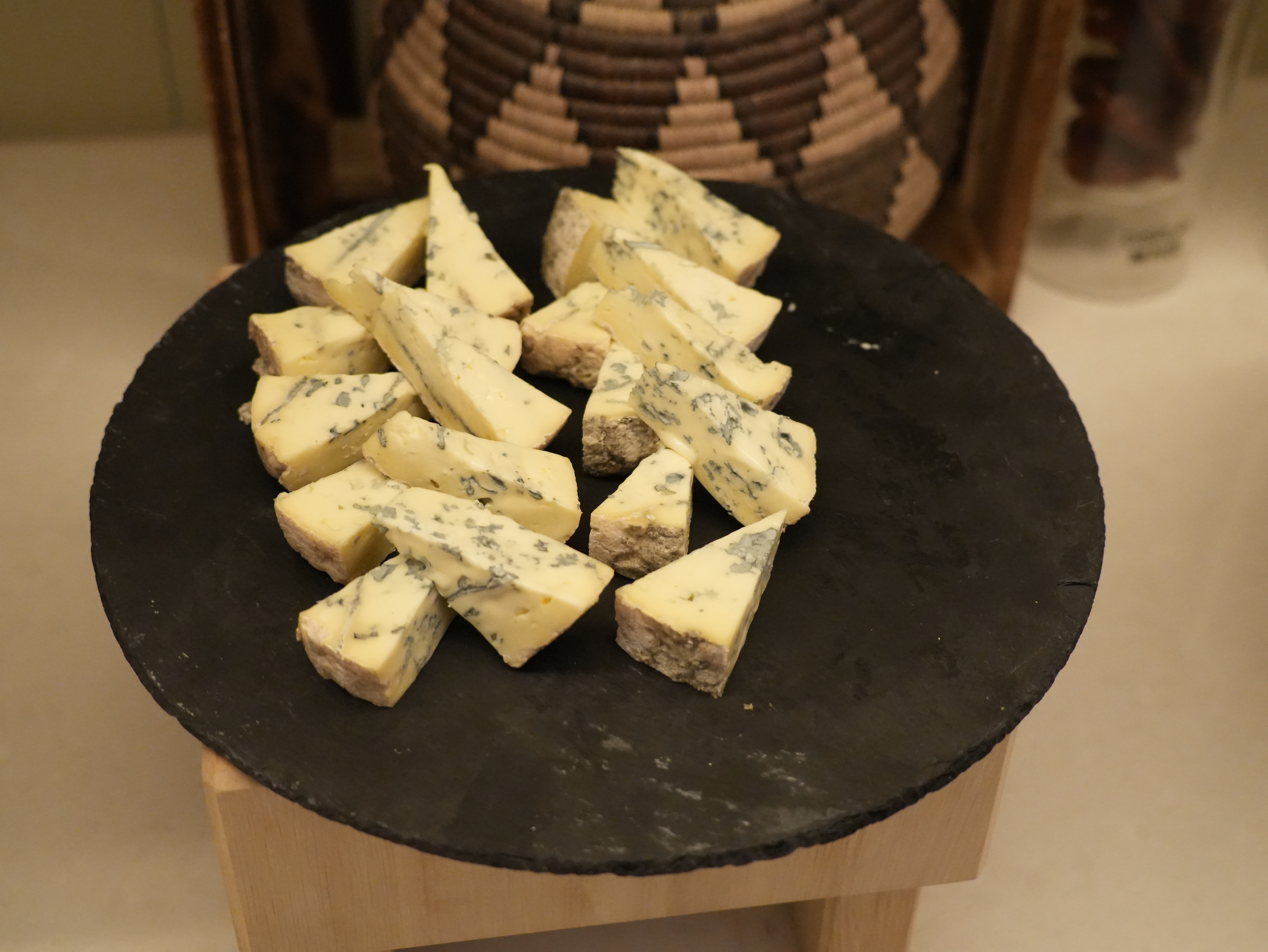

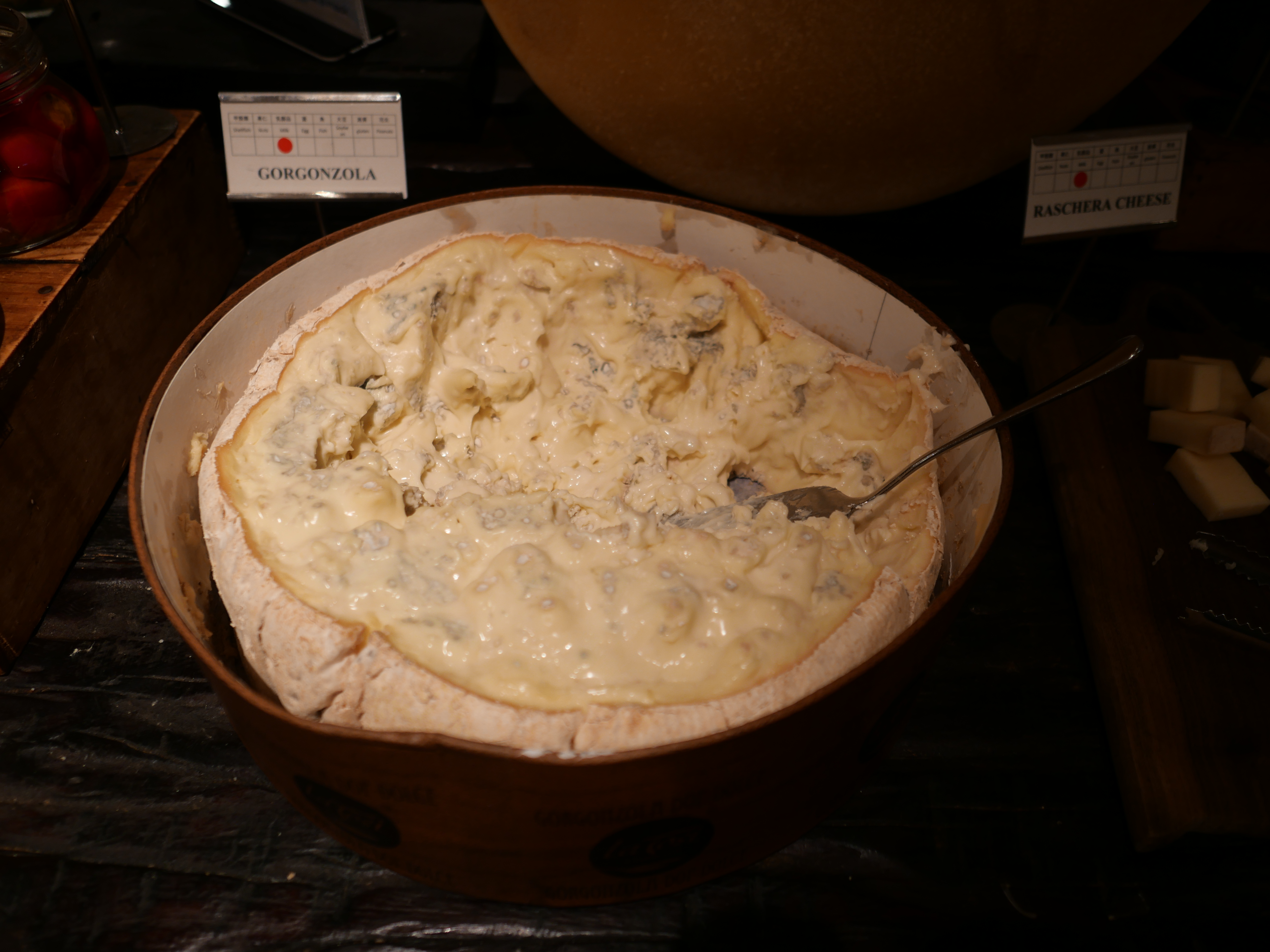

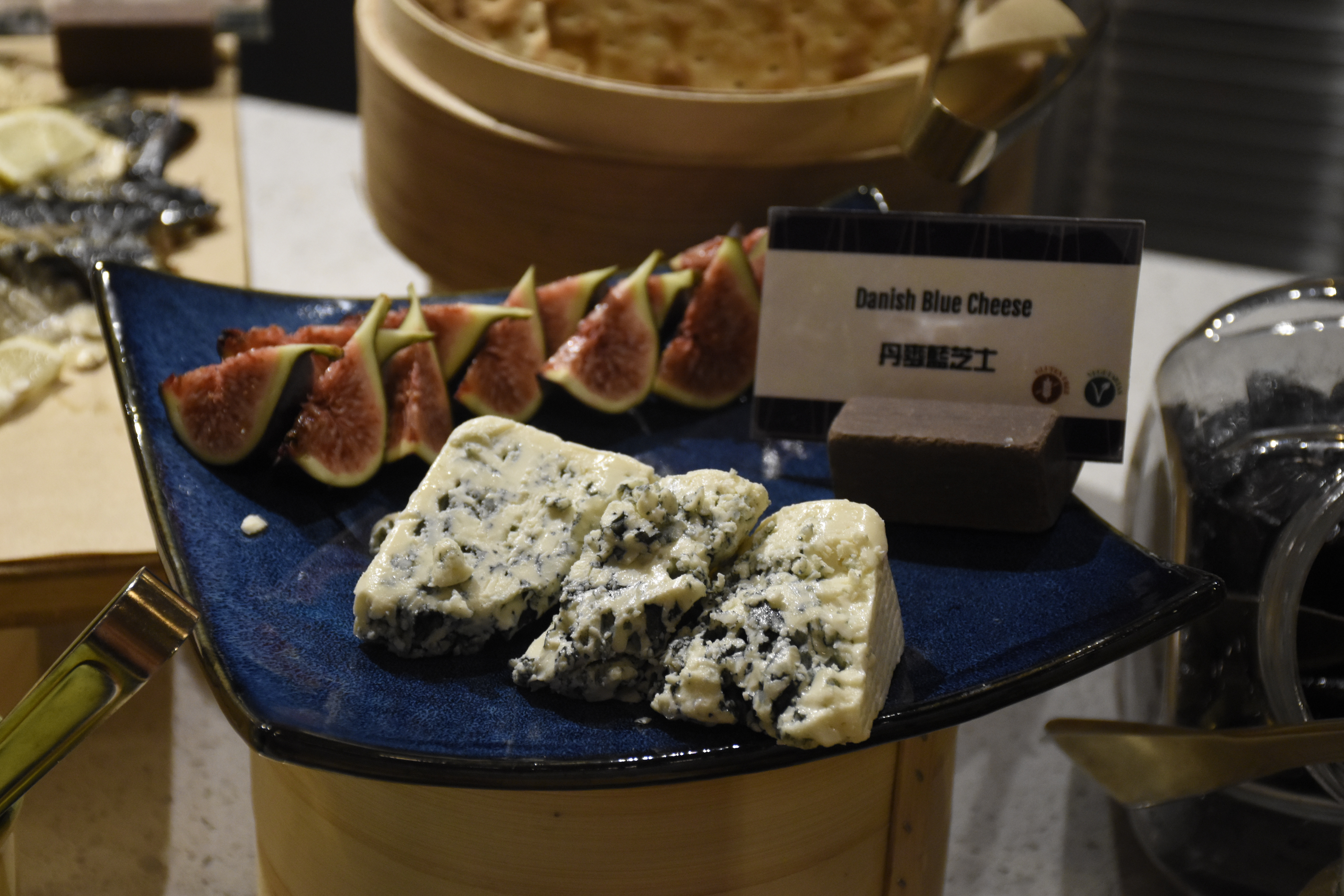

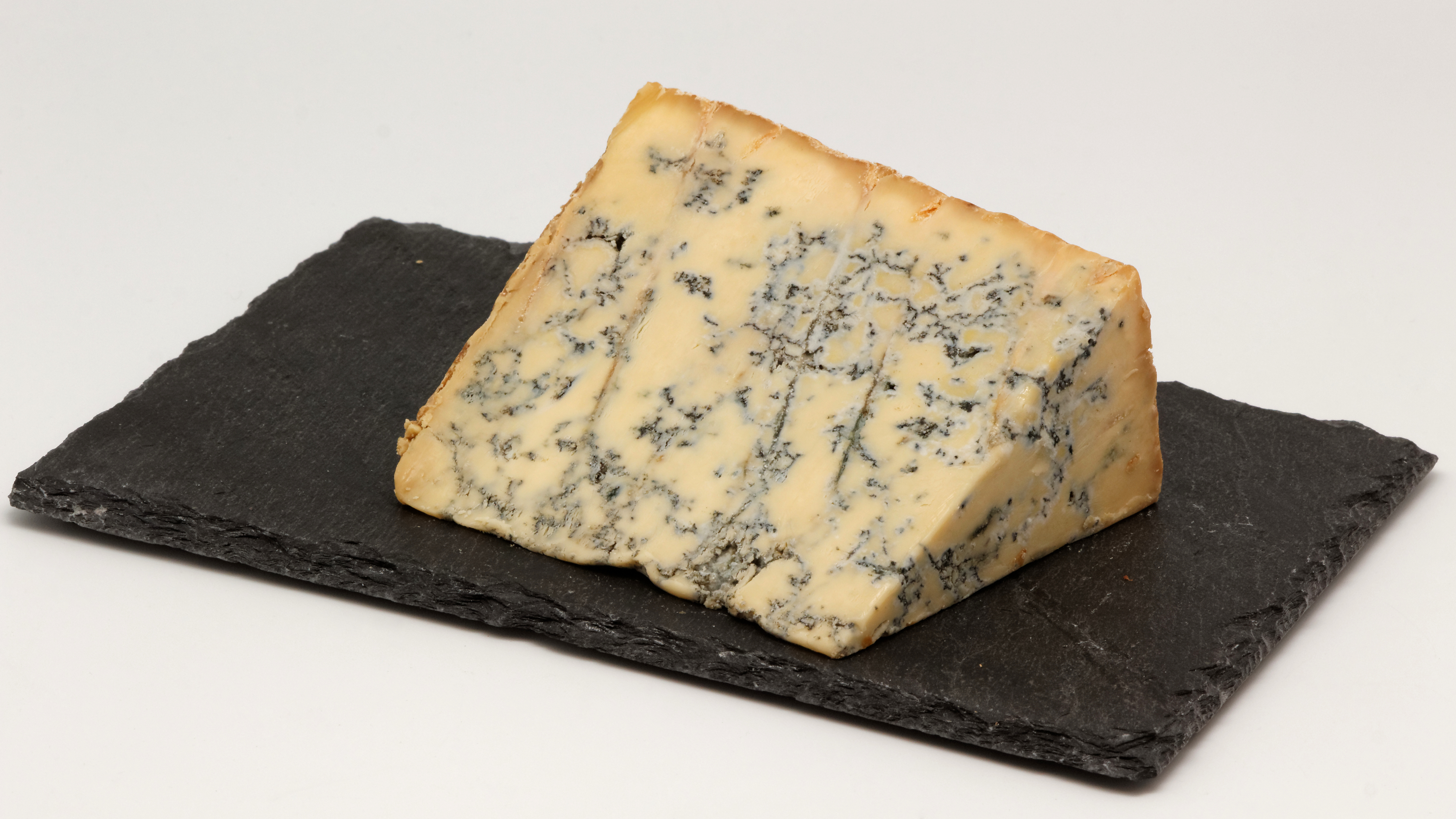

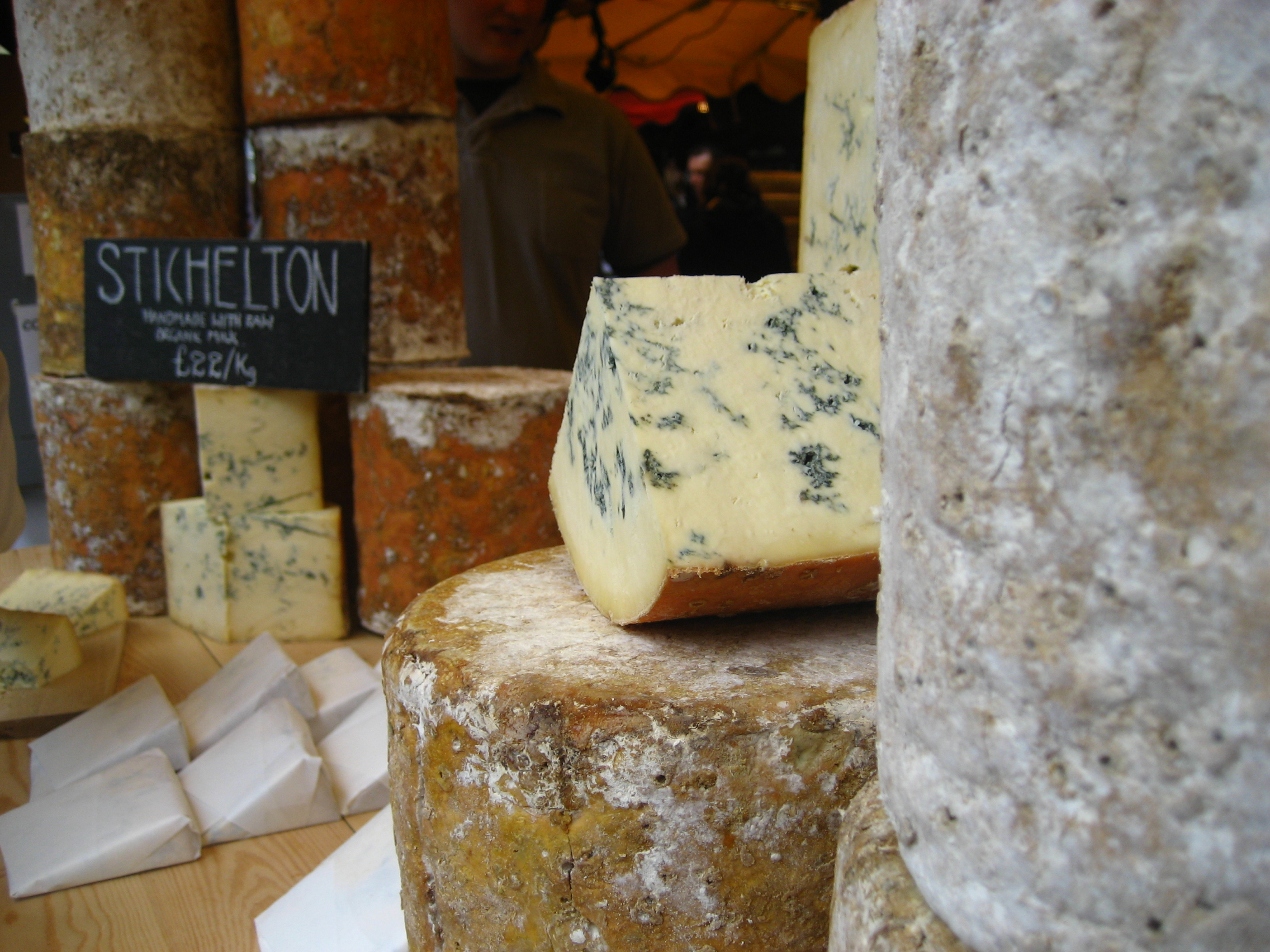

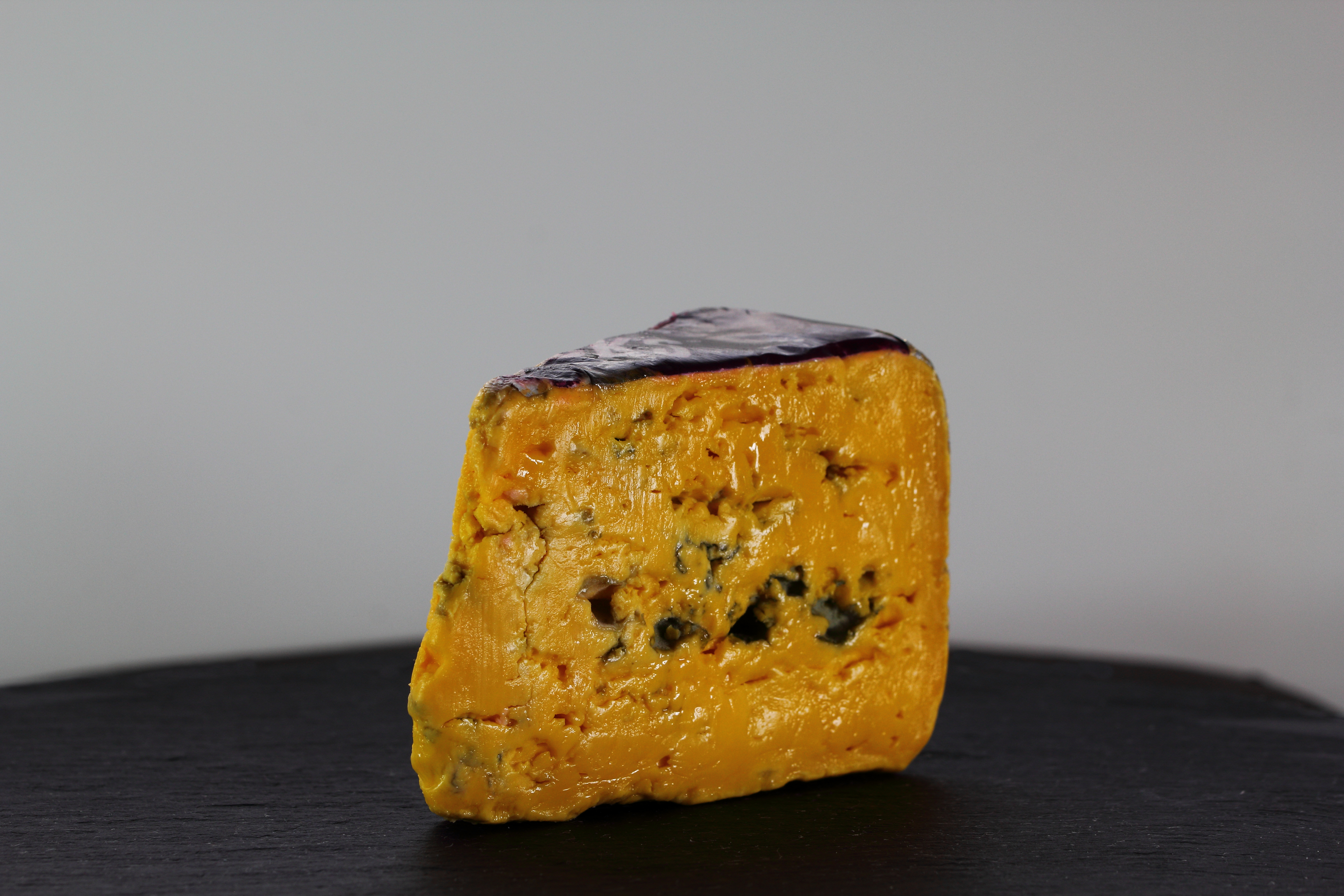

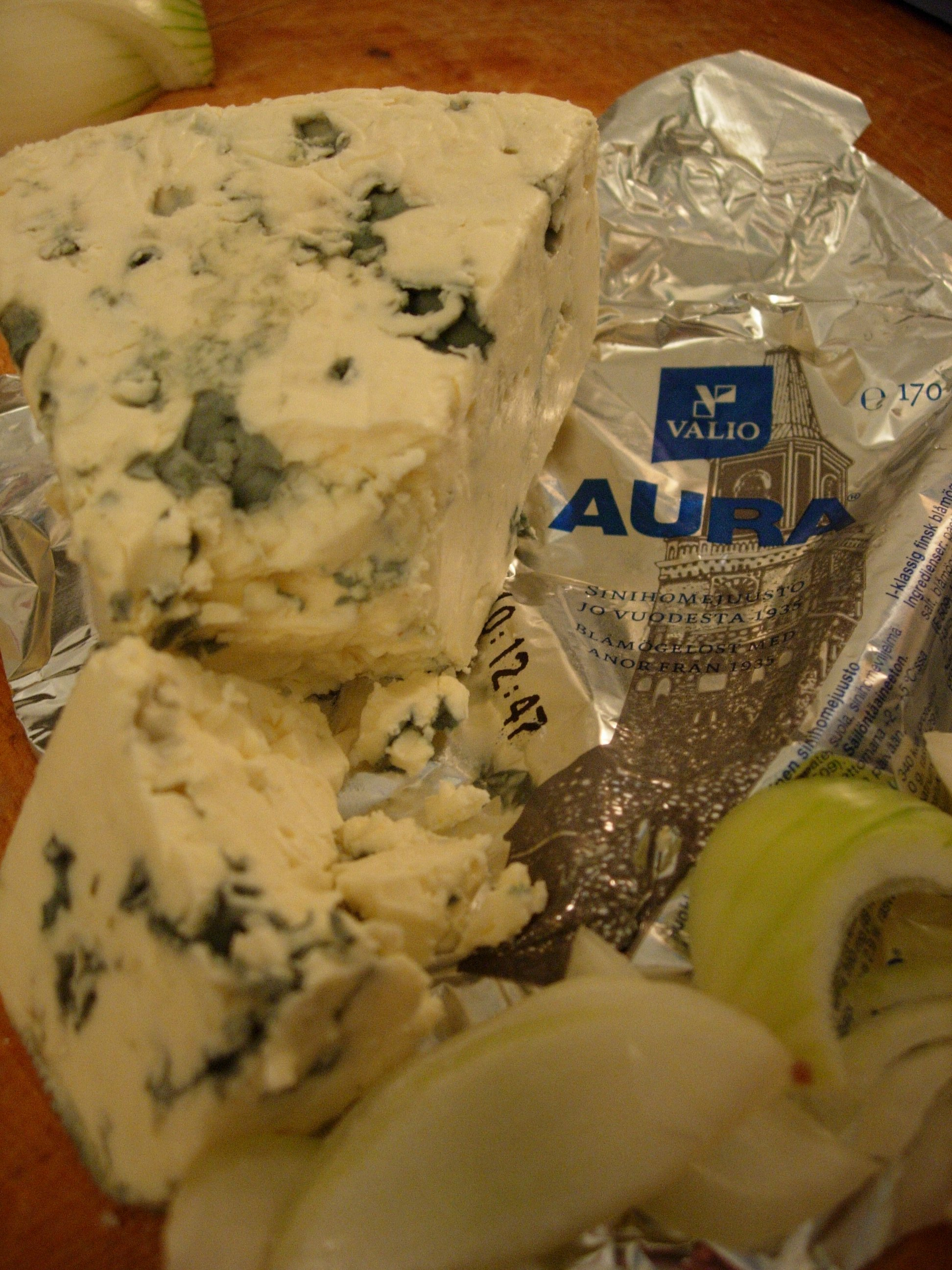
