= Penicillium hetheringtonii =

Scientific classification
- Domain: Eukaryota
- Kingdom: Fungi
- Division: Ascomycota
- Class: Eurotiomycetes
- Order: Eurotiales
- Family: Aspergillaceae
- Genus: Penicillium
- Species: P. hetheringtonii

Binomial name
- Penicillium hetheringtonii Houbraken, Frisvad & Samson 2010

Species of fungus

Penicillium hetheringtonii is a species of the genus of Penicillium which is named after A.C. Hetherington. This species was first isolated from beach soil in Land's End Garden in Treasure Island, Florida in the United States. Penicillium hetheringtonii produces citrinin and quinolactacin.
