= Penicillium velutinum =

Scientific classification
- Kingdom: Fungi
- Division: Ascomycota
- Class: Eurotiomycetes
- Order: Eurotiales
- Family: Aspergillaceae
- Genus: Penicillium
- Species: P. velutinum

Binomial name
- Penicillium velutinum Beyma, F.H. van. 1935

Type strain
- ATCC 10510, CBS 250.32, CECT 2318, CGMCC 3.4481, CMI 40571, FRR 2069, IJFM 5108, IMI 040571, KCTC 6269, MUCL 38794, NRRL 2069, QM 7686, VKM F-379

Synonyms
- Citromyces fuscus Penicillium pinetorum

Species of fungus

Penicillium velutinum is an anamorph species of fungus in the genus Penicillium which produces citrinin. Penicillium velutinum can spoil fruit juices.
