= Penicillium corylophilum =

Scientific classification
- Kingdom: Fungi
- Division: Ascomycota
- Class: Eurotiomycetes
- Order: Eurotiales
- Family: Aspergillaceae
- Genus: Penicillium
- Species: P. corylophilum

Binomial name
- Penicillium corylophilum Dierckx, R.P. 1901

Type strain
- CBS 330.79, IJFM 5147

Synonyms
- Penicillium barcinonense, Penicillium chloroleucon, Penicillium obscurum, Penicillium citreovirens, Penicillium corylophiloides, Penicillium coeruleoviride, Penicillium citreovirens

Species of fungus

Penicillium corylophilum is a species of the genus of Penicillium which occurs in damp buildings in United States, Canada and western Europe but it can also be found in a variety of foods and mosquitoes. Penicillium corylophilum produces the alkaloid epoxyagroclavine and citrinin and is a pathogen to mosquitoes.

== See also ==
- List of Penicillium species
