= Viridicatumtoxin B =

Names
- IUPAC name (1S,7a'S,11a'R)-5',6',7a',10',11a'-Pentahydroxy-3'-methoxy-2,6,6-trimethyl-7',8',12'-trioxo-7',7a',8',11',11a',12'-hexahydro-1'H-spiro[cyclohex-2-ene-1,2'-cyclopenta[de]tetracene]-9'-carboxamide

Identifiers
3D model (JSmol)	Interactive image; tautomer: Interactive image
ChEBI	tautomer: CHEBI:218823
ChemSpider	29355821; tautomer: 78441369
PubChem CID	tautomer: 72204240
- InChI: InChI=1S/C30H29NO10/c1-11-6-5-7-27(2,3)28(11)9-12-16-18(13(32)8-15(41-4)21(16)28)22(34)20-17(12)23(35)29(39)10-14(33)19(26(31)38)24(36)30(29,40)25(20)37/h6,8,32-34,39-40H,5,7,9-10H2,1-4H3,(H2,31,38)/t28-,29-,30+/m0/s1 Key: SSOXEPGCLBSNOP-OIFRRMEBSA-N; tautomer: InChI=1S/C30H29NO10/c1-11-6-5-7-27(2,3)28(11)9-12-16-18(13(32)8-15(41-4)21(16)28)22(34)20-17(12)23(35)29(39)10-14(33)19(26(31)38)24(36)30(29,40)25(20)37/h6,8,32,34,36,39-40H,5,7,9-10H2,1-4H3,(H2,31,38)/t28-,29-,30+/m0/s1 Key: WUFPHUQCGWRGKE-OIFRRMEBSA-N
- SMILES: CC1=CCCC([C@@]12Cc3c4c2c(cc(c4c(c5c3C(=O)[C@]6(CC(=C(C(=O)[C@]6(C5=O)O)C(=O)N)O)O)O)O)OC)(C)C; tautomer: CC1=CCCC([C@@]12CC3=C4C2=C(C=C(C4=C(C5=C3C(=O)[C@]6(CC(=O)C(=C([C@]6(C5=O)O)O)C(=O)N)O)O)O)OC)(C)C

Properties
Chemical formula	C_{30}H_{29}NO_{10}
Molar mass	563.559 g·mol^{−1}
- Except where otherwise noted, data are given for materials in their standard state (at 25 °C [77 °F], 100 kPa). Infobox references

Viridicatumtoxin B is a fungus-derived tetracycline-like antibiotic discovered in 2008. It was isolated from small amounts of penicillium fungi.

Analogs lacking a hydroxyl group were even more effective than the original against Gram-positive bacteria.

Concerns about solubility, biodegradation, availability and other issues must be resolved before clinical development begins.

== History ==
The substance was first isolated from the mycelium of liquid fermentation cultures of Penicillium species FR11.

== Structure ==
Based on mass spectrometry and nuclear magnetic resonance data, the substance was originally thought to be the 11a',12'-epoxide, but the structure was later revised.

== Effects ==
Viridicatumtoxin B inhibited the growth of Staphylococcus aureus, including methicillin resistant S. aureus and quinolone-resistant S. aureus with a minimum inhibitory concentration of 0.5 μg/ml. That effect is similar to that of vancomycin, but 8 to 64 times greater than that of tetracycline.

== Total synthesis ==
A complete total synthesis of viridicatumtoxin B, in racemic form, was completed in 2013 by the group of K. C. Nicolaou.

== See also ==
- Viridicatumtoxin A
