= Penicillium aethiopicum =

Scientific classification
- Kingdom: Fungi
- Division: Ascomycota
- Class: Eurotiomycetes
- Order: Eurotiales
- Family: Aspergillaceae
- Genus: Penicillium
- Species: P. aethiopicum

Binomial name
- Penicillium aethiopicum Frisvad, J.C.; Filtenborg, O. 1989

Type strain
- BCRC 32957, CBS 484.84, CCRC 32957, ETH 11, FRR 2942, IBT 21501, IBT 5903, IMI 285524

Species of fungus

Penicillium aethiopicum is a fungus species of the genus of Penicillium. Penicillium aethiopicum produces viridicatumtoxin and griseofulvin, two structurally interesting polyketides.

== See also ==
- List of Penicillium species
