= Penicillium implicatum =

Scientific classification
- Kingdom: Fungi
- Division: Ascomycota
- Class: Eurotiomycetes
- Order: Eurotiales
- Family: Aspergillaceae
- Genus: Penicillium
- Species: P. implicatum

Binomial name
- Penicillium implicatum Biourge, P. 1923

Type strain
- ATCC 48445, CBS 184.81, CMI 190235, FRR 2061, IAM 13675, IMI 190235, JCM 22745, KCTC 6436, MUCL 38793, NRRL 2061

Species of fungus

Penicillium implicatum is an anamorph species of the genus of Penicillium which causes postharvest rot on pomegranate. Penicillium implicatum produces Citrinin
