= Viridicatumtoxin A =

Names
- Preferred IUPAC name (1S,7′aS,11′aS,12′S)-5′,6′,7′a,8′,11′a,12′-Hexahydroxy-3′-methoxy-2,6,6-trimethyl-7′,10′-dioxo-7′,7′a,10′,11′,11′a,12′-hexahydro-1′H-spiro[cyclohexane-1,2′-cyclopenta[de]tetracen]-2-ene-9′-carboxamide

Identifiers
CAS Number	39277-41-3
3D model (JSmol)	Interactive image
ChEBI	CHEBI:85616
ChemSpider	23354402
PubChem CID	54686377
UNII	S8N62PLU21
CompTox Dashboard (EPA)	DTXSID20893991
- InChI: InChI=1S/C30H31NO10/c1-11-6-5-7-27(2,3)28(11)9-12-16-18(13(32)8-15(41-4)21(16)28)22(34)20-17(12)23(35)29(39)10-14(33)19(26(31)38)24(36)30(29,40)25(20)37/h6,8,23,32-35,39-40H,5,7,9-10H2,1-4H3,(H2,31,38)/t23-,28-,29-,30+/m0/s1 Key: SUWQGLGDFGHZNH-WBWZXODPSA-N
- SMILES: CC1=CCC[C@@]([C@]12c3c4c(c(c5c(c4C2)[C@@H]([C@@]6([C@](C5=O)(C(=O)C(=C(C6)O)C(=O)N)O)O)O)O)c(cc3OC)O)(C)C

Properties
Chemical formula	C_{30}H_{31}NO_{10}
Molar mass	565.575 g·mol^{−1}
- Except where otherwise noted, data are given for materials in their standard state (at 25 °C [77 °F], 100 kPa). Infobox references

Viridicatumtoxin A (also simply called viridicatumtoxin) is a fungus-derived tetracycline-like antibiotic, whose chemical structure was determined in 1976. It is found in Penicillium viridicatum, Penicillium aethiopicum, among other fungi.

Like viridicatumtoxin B, viridicatumtoxin A inhibits growth of Staphylococcus aureus, including methicillin resistant S. aureus and quinolone-resistant S. aureus, with an activity 8 to 64 times greater than that of tetracycline.
