= C16H18N2O =

The molecular formula C_{16}H_{18}N_{2}O (molar mass: 254.33 g/mol) may refer to:

- Amphenone B, or amphenone
- Elymoclavine
- Epoxyagroclavine
- Lysergol
- Setoclavine
