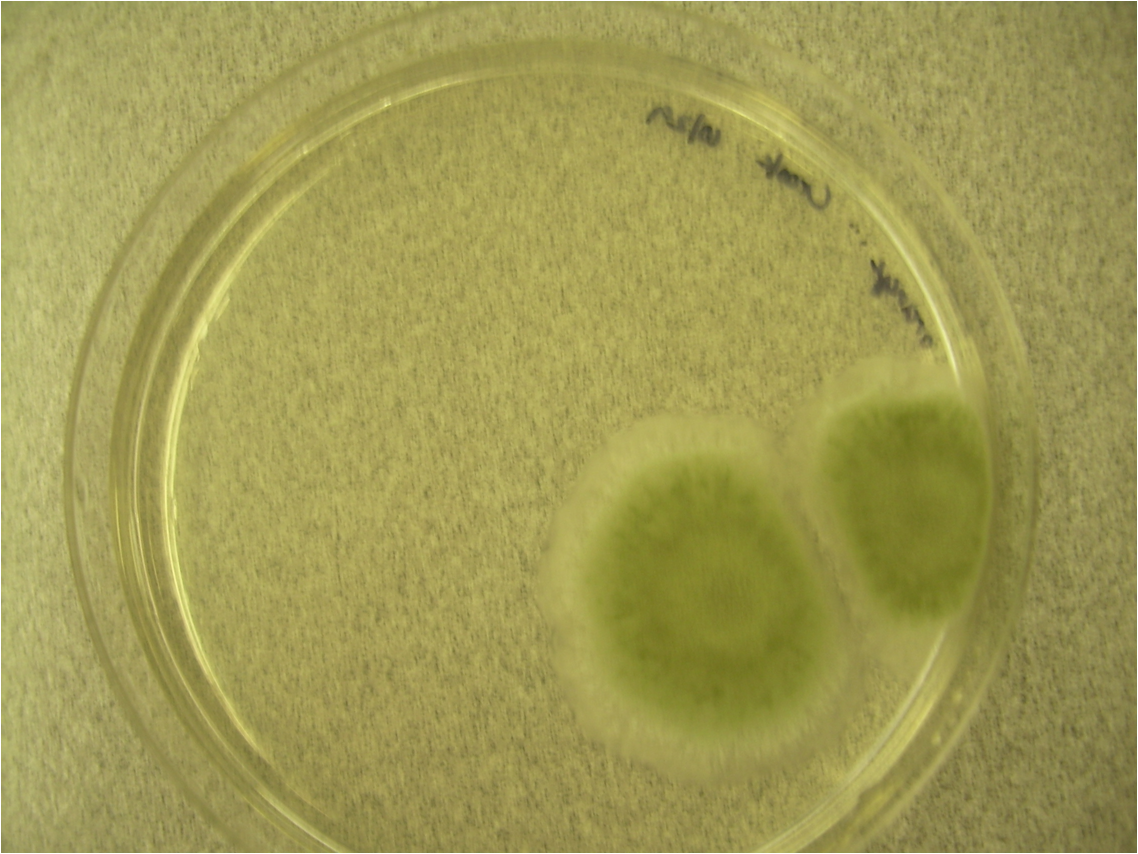

Conservation status
- Secure (NatureServe)

Scientific classification
- Kingdom: Fungi
- Division: Ascomycota
- Class: Eurotiomycetes
- Order: Eurotiales
- Family: Aspergillaceae
- Genus: Penicillium
- Species: P. expansum

Binomial name
- Penicillium expansum Link, (1809)

Synonyms
- Penicillium crustaceum Link, (1809); Penicillium glaucum Stoll, (1809)

= Penicillium expansum =

Species of fungus

Penicillium expansum is a psychrotolerant blue mold that is common throughout the world in soil. It causes Blue Mold of apples, one of the most prevalent and economically damaging post-harvest diseases of apples.

Though primarily known as a disease of apples, this plant pathogen can infect a wide range of hosts, including pears, strawberries, tomatoes, corn, and rice. Penicillium expansum produces the carcinogenic metabolite patulin, a neurotoxin that is harmful when consumed. Patulin is produced by the fungus as a virulence factor as it infects the host. Patulin levels in foods are regulated by the governments of many developed countries. Patulin is a particular health concern for young children, who are often heavy consumers of apple products. The fungus can also produce the mycotoxin citrinin.

== Hosts and disease development ==
Penicillium expansum has a wide host range, causing similar symptoms on fruits which include apples, pears, cherries, and citrus. Initial infection most often occurs at sites of fruit injury, such as bruises or puncture wounds. Although infections may start in the field, infected spots often become evident post-harvest, and expand while fruit is in storage. Infected areas are clearly delineated and light brown, and soft decaying tissue can be easily "scooped" out of the surrounding healthy tissue.

Spore masses later appear on the surfaces of infected fruit, initially appearing as white mycelium, then turning blue to blue-green in color as the asexual spores mature. Fruit affected by P. expansum typically has an earthy, musty odor. Lesions measure 1–1.25 inches in diameter eight to ten weeks after infection if kept under cold storage conditions. Age factors into P. expansum infection, in that overripe or mature fruits are most susceptible to infection, while those picked underripe are less likely to become infected.

In apples, the colors of the lesions may vary with variety, from lighter-brown on green and yellow apple varieties, to dark-brown on the deeper-red and other darker-color varieties. Varieties particularly susceptible to P. expansum infection include McIntosh, Golden Supreme, and Golden Delicious.

Both sweet and sour cherries are affected by P. expansum. Cherry varieties found to be particularly susceptible to P. expansum infection were mainly early varieties, including Navalinda and Burlat.

== Diagnosis ==
Penicillium expansum can be identified by its morphological characteristics and secondary metabolites in fruit, or in axenic culture. The presence of the secondary metabolite patulin can suggest P. expansum infection, but this method is not species-specific, as a number of different Penicillium species and their allies produce patulin. Patulin presence can be assayed using high-performance liquid chromatography with ultraviolet detection. Molecular methods based on species-specific genes can speed identification.

== Environment ==
Penicillium expansum grows best in wet, cool (<25C) conditions. P. expansum was found to grow most efficiently in a temperature range of 15–27 degrees Celsius (~59–81 °F), with slower growth at lower and higher temperatures. P. expansum grows best in wet conditions; growth rate has been found to be fastest at a relative humidity of 90%. P. expansum infection acidifies host tissues via the secretion of organic acids, and that acidification enhances fungal development, indicating a link between environmental acidity and P. expansum virulence.

== Disease cycle ==
P. expansum infects a fruit via wounds through which the conidia are able to enter. Usually, puncturing, bruising, and limb rubs occur during harvesting, packaging, and processing of the fruit, all of which provide sites through which spores can enter the fruit. Conidia can be found in soil, decaying debris, and tree bark, and can survive cold temperatures. Conidia may be isolated from the air of the orchard and packaging house, on the walls of the packaging houses, and from the water and fungicide solution into which harvested fruits are dunked before packaging or storage. Exposure to conidia at any step of growth, harvesting, processing, shipping, and storage can lead to inoculation and disease. Conidia that have gained access via a wound can germinate to form a germ tube. This germ tube will continue to grow as hyphae, which colonize the fruit, killing fruit cells in an expanding infection.

If the fungus has colonized the fruit with mycelium, the formation of conidiophores occurs on the surface or subsurface of the hyphae. The conidiophores are mostly smooth-walled terverticillate penicilli. A terverticillate pencilii has multiple branch points below the phialides, the cells that the conidia are attached to. However, at times, the penicilli may be rough or biverticillate (only two levels of branching). The phialides are packed close together with nearly a cylindrical shape. The conidia are dry, smooth, elliptical, and "dull-green" in color and are often disseminated by wind currents.

Sexual reproduction has not been observed in nature for P. expansum.

== Management ==
Due to the susceptibility to infection of mature and overripe fruit, post-harvest treatment of fruit with fungicides is the most common method of combating P. expansum. Proper sanitation and careful handling of the fruit are two non-chemical methods that can help control the disease. Good sanitation reduces contact with orchard soil either on the fruit or in transportation containers. And since the fungus needs a wound to infect, careful handling can reduce infection even when the fungus is present. Chemical treatment with a chlorine bath can be effective in killing spores. Biofungicides using active ingredients such as bacteria and yeast have been successful in preventing infection, but are ineffective against existing infections.

== Importance ==
Penicillium expansum produces the mycotoxin patulin, a neurotoxin that can enter the food supply via apples and apple products such as juice and cider. Considering the size of the apple product industry and the large number of people that may come into contact with infected fruits, control of P. expansum is vitally important.
