= Penicillium steckii =

Scientific classification
- Domain: Eukaryota
- Kingdom: Fungi
- Division: Ascomycota
- Class: Eurotiomycetes
- Order: Eurotiales
- Family: Aspergillaceae
- Genus: Penicillium
- Species: P. steckii

Binomial name
- Penicillium steckii Zalessky, K.M. 1927

Type strain
- CBS 260.55

Synonyms
- Penicillium sumatraense, Penicillium baradicum

Species of fungus

Penicillium steckii is a species of fungus in the genus Penicillium which produces citrinin, tanzawaic acid E, tanzawaic acid F.
