= Aspergillus niveus =

Scientific classification
- Kingdom: Fungi
- Division: Ascomycota
- Class: Eurotiomycetes
- Order: Eurotiales
- Family: Aspergillaceae
- Genus: Aspergillus
- Species: A. niveus

Binomial name
- Aspergillus niveus Blochwitz (1929)

Species of fungus

Aspergillus niveus is a species of fungus in the genus Aspergillus. It is from the Terrei section. The species was first described in 1929. It has been reported to cause pulmonary aspergillosis. It has been reported to produce aszonalenine, butyrolactones, citrinin, and gregatins.

== Growth and morphology ==
A. niveus has been cultivated on both Czapek yeast extract agar (CYA) plates and Malt Extract Agar Oxoid® (MEAOX) plates. The growth morphology of the colonies can be seen in the pictures below.

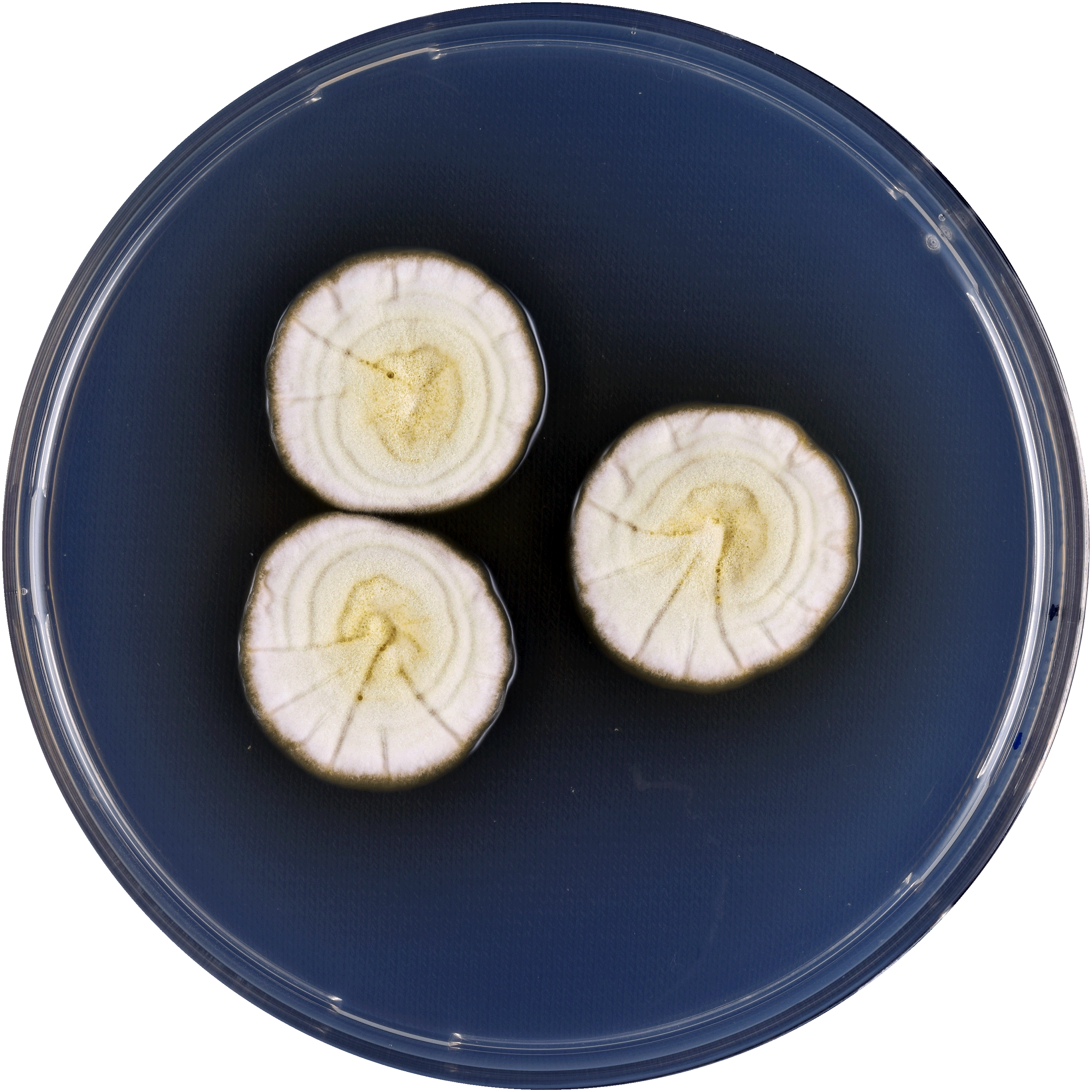
Aspergillus niveus growing on CYA plate

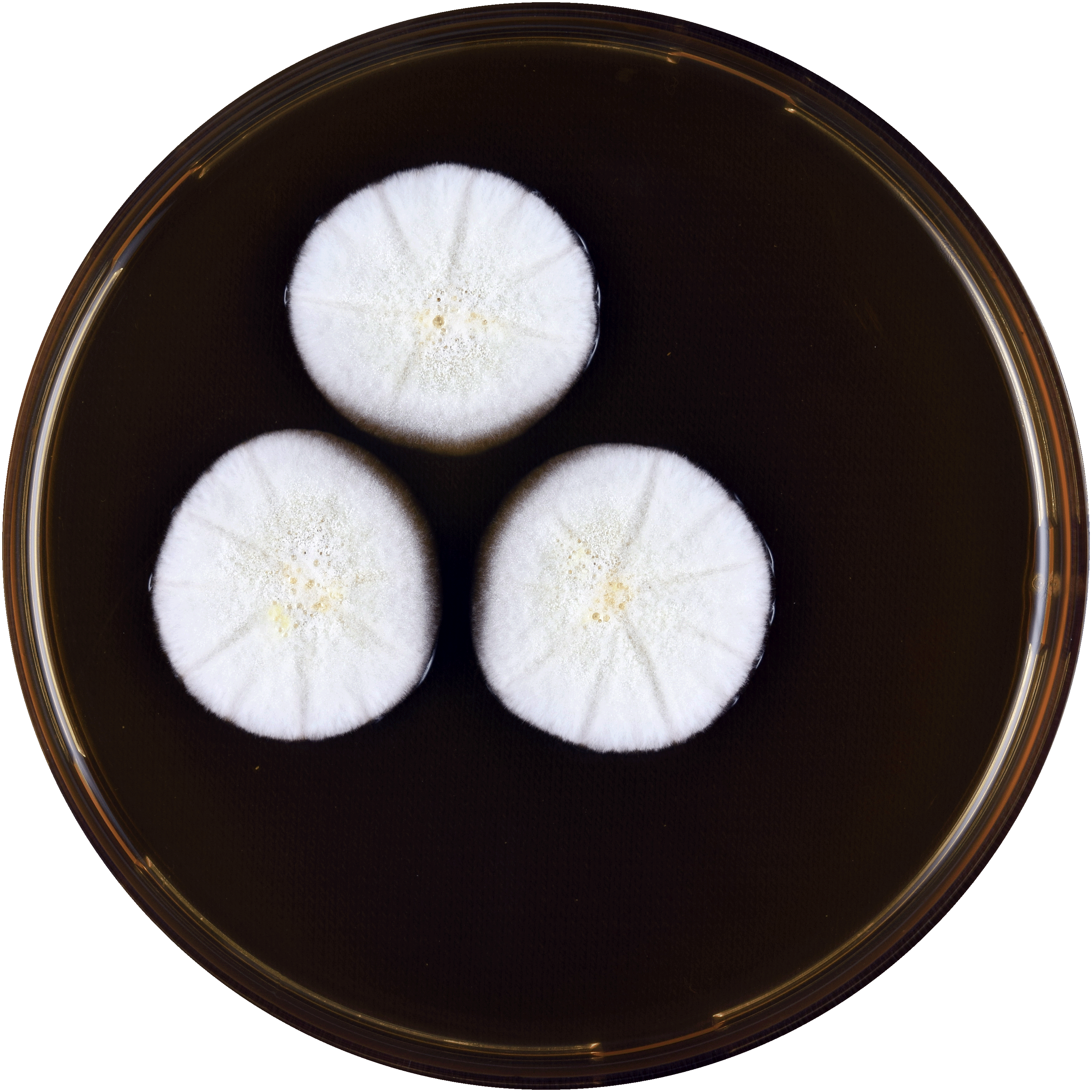
Aspergillus niveus growing on MEAOX plate
