= Penicillium imranianum =

Scientific classification
- Domain: Eukaryota
- Kingdom: Fungi
- Division: Ascomycota
- Class: Eurotiomycetes
- Order: Eurotiales
- Family: Aspergillaceae
- Genus: Penicillium
- Species: P. imranianum

Binomial name
- Penicillium imranianum Imran Ali

Species of fungus

Penicillium imranianum is a species of fungus in the genus Penicillium.

Penicillium imranianum has been isolated from a man made solar saltern in Phetchaburi province in Thailand in 2010. The species information was deposited in NCBI, Mycobank and Index Fungorum. The species is present in TISTR with code 3655 and holotype EMCB-HF08 at RUBEM. The species is published as research article in Pakistan journal of Botany.
