= Ernest Duchesne =

French physician

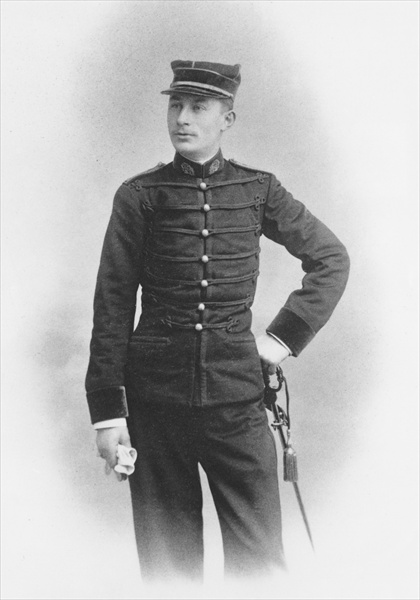
- Born: Ernest Augustin Clement Duchesne; 30 May 1874
- Died: 12 April 1912 (aged 37); Amélie-les-Bains-Palalda, Pyrénées-Orientales, France
- Burial place: Cimetière du Grand Jas
- Occupation: Physician
- Spouse: Rosa Lassallas (1881–1903)

Ernest Duchesne (30 May 1874 – 12 April 1912) was a French physician who noted that certain molds kill bacteria. He made this discovery 32 years before Alexander Fleming discovered the antibiotic properties of penicillin, a substance derived from those molds, but his research went unnoticed.

== Life and work ==
Duchesne entered l'Ecole du Service de Santé Militaire de Lyon (the Military Health Service School of Lyons) in 1894. Duchesne's thesis, "Contribution à l’étude de la concurrence vitale chez les micro-organismes: antagonisme entre les moisissures et les microbes" (Contribution to the study of vital competition in micro-organisms: antagonism between molds and microbes), that he submitted in 1897 to get his doctorate degree, was the first study to consider the therapeutic capabilities of molds resulting from their anti-microbial activity.

In his landmark thesis, Duchesne proposed that bacteria and molds engage in a perpetual battle for survival. In one experiment, he treated cultures of Penicillium glaucum with media containing either bacteria that cause typhoid fever (Salmonella enterica subsp. enterica, formerly: Bacillus typhosus (Eberth)) or Escherichia coli (formerly: Bacterium coli communis); the Penicillium succumbed to the bacteria. Nevertheless, he wondered whether the Penicillium might have weakened the bacteria before the mold perished. So he injected guinea pigs with media containing bacteria (either typhoid or E. coli) and media containing Penicillium glaucum. The animals survived and were rendered immune to the bacteria. He speculated that molds might release toxins, as some bacteria do. To treat diseases, he proposed using media in which either bacteria or molds had been cultured. Duchesne concluded that:

V. Il semble, d'autre part, résulter de quelques-unes de nos expériences, malheureusement trop peu nombreuses et qu'il importera de répéter à nouveau et de contrôler, que certaines moisissures (Penicillum glaucum), inoculées à un animal en même temps que des cultures très virulentes de quelques microbes pathogènes (B. coli et B. typhosus d'Eberth), sont capables d'atténuer dans de très notables proportions la virulence de ces cultures bactériennes.

Translation: V. It seems, on the other hand, to follow from some of our experiments – unfortunately too few and which it will be important to repeat anew and to check – that certain molds (Penicillum glaucum), inoculated into an animal at the same time as very virulent cultures of some pathogenic microbes (E. coli and typhoid), are capable of reducing to a very considerable degree the virulence of these bacterial cultures.

— Ernest Duchesne, Contribution à l’étude de la concurrence vitale chez les micro-organismes: antagonisme entre les moisissures et les microbes, p. 54.

While only weakly conclusive given the number of the experimental trials, this proves Duchesne understood, concluded, and published information about the effect of the Penicillium glaucum mold as a therapeutic agent in animals. Because he was 23 and unknown, the Institut Pasteur did not even acknowledge receipt of his dissertation.

Duchesne served a one-year internship at Val-de-Grâce before he was appointed a 2nd class Major of Medicine in the 2nd Regiment de Hussards de Senlis. On 16 December 1900, he married Rosa Lassallas from Cannes. She died 2 years later of tuberculosis. In 1904, Duchesne also contracted a serious chest disease, probably tuberculosis. Three years later, he was discharged from the army and sent to a sanatorium in Amélie-les-Bains. He died on 12 April 1912, at age 37. Duchesne is buried next to his wife in the Cimetière du Grand Jas in Cannes.

== Recognition ==
Duchesne was posthumously honored in 1949, 5 years after Alexander Fleming had received the Nobel Prize.

A history of antibiotics contains a suggestion on why it was forgotten:

While Fleming generally receives credit for discovering penicillin, in fact, technically, Fleming rediscovered the substance. In 1896, the French medical student Ernest Duchesne originally discovered the antibiotic properties of Penicillium but failed to report a connection between the fungus and a substance that had antibacterial properties, and Penicillium was forgotten in the scientific community until Fleming's rediscovery.

== See also ==
- History of penicillin
