= Penicillium viridicatum =

Scientific classification
- Kingdom: Fungi
- Division: Ascomycota
- Class: Eurotiomycetes
- Order: Eurotiales
- Family: Aspergillaceae
- Genus: Penicillium
- Species: P. viridicatum

Binomial name
- Penicillium viridicatum Westling, R. 1911

Type strain
- ATCC 10515, CBS 390.48, CGMCC 3.4518, CGMCC 3.7905, CMI 39758, FRR 0963, IAM 13783, IFO 7736, IMI 039758, IMI 039758ii, IMI 136118, JCM 22829, KCTC 6117, MUCL 29438, MUCL 39358, NBRC 7736, NRRL 963, NRRL 963 :, QM 7683, Thom 298-5740-2, Thom 5740.2

Synonyms
- Penicillium stephaniae, Penicillium olivicolor Penicillium aurantiogriseum var. viridicatum

Species of fungus

Penicillium viridicatum is a psychrophilic species of fungus in the genus, penicillic acid and citrinin. Penicillium viridicatum can spoil grapes and melons.
