= William Roberts (physician) =

British physician (1830–1899)

Sir William Roberts FRS
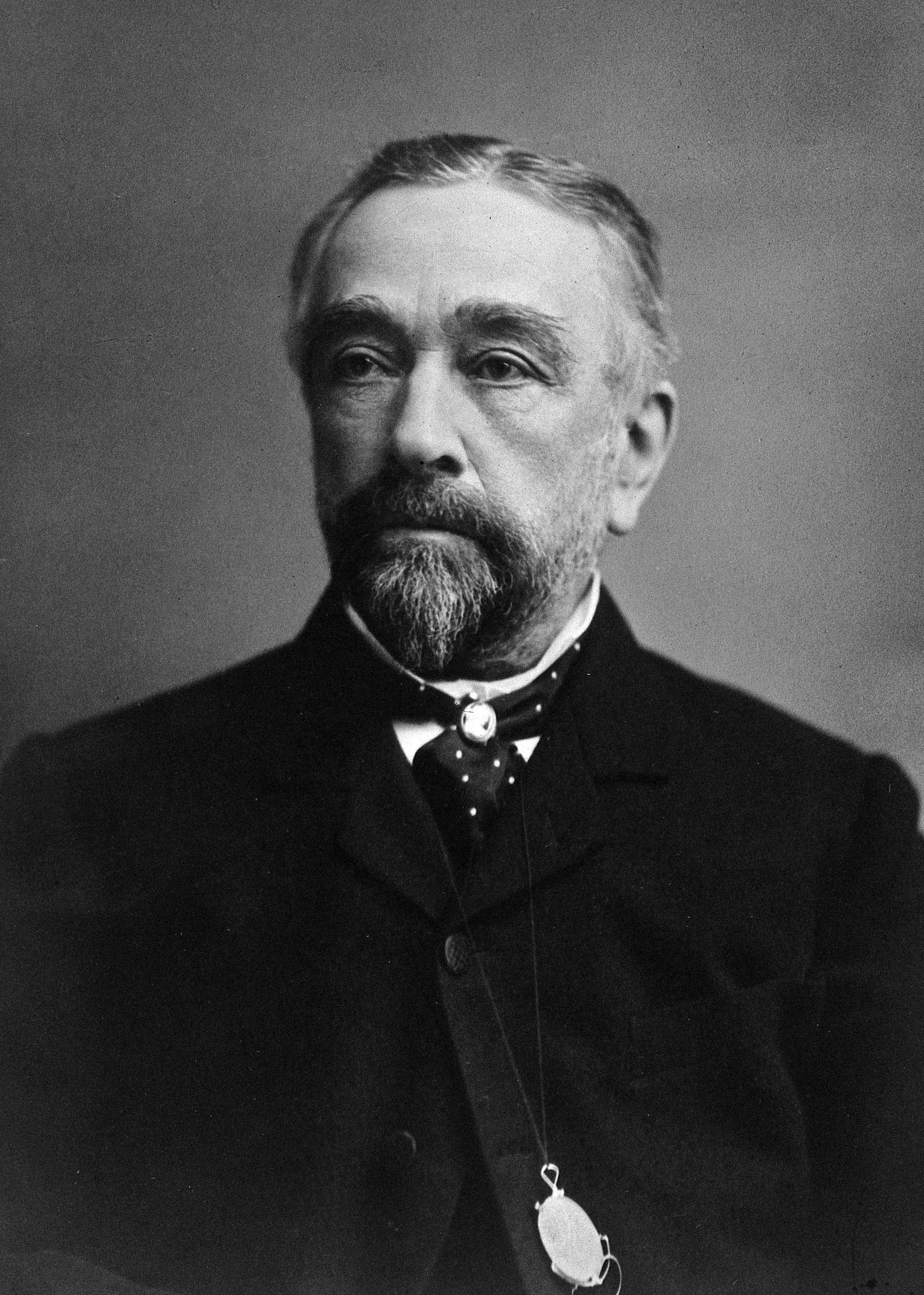
- Born: 18 March 1830; Bodedern, Anglesey, Wales
- Died: 16 April 1899 (aged 69); London, England
- Occupation: Consulting Physician
- Spouse: Elizabeth Johnson
- Awards: Cameron Prize for Therapeutics of the University of Edinburgh (1880)

Sir William Roberts FRS (18 March 1830 – 16 April 1899) was a British physician in Manchester, England.

== Biography ==
Roberts was born on 18 March 1830 at Bodedern on the Isle of Anglesey the son of David and Sarah Roberts. He was educated at Mill Hill School and at University College London, graduating with a BA in 1851.

After completion of his medical studies he was appointed a house surgeon at Manchester Royal Infirmary. He was elected to membership of the Manchester Literary and Philosophical Society on 24 January 1860 after becoming a member of the Royal College of Surgeons. He was appointed Professor of Medicine, Owens College, Manchester from 1863 to 1883. His particular research field was that of renal disease. He was elected a Fellow of the Royal Society in 1877 and knighted in 1885.

He died in London on 16 April 1899, and was buried in Llanymawddwy, Merionethshire.

== Contribution to the discovery of penicillin ==
Between 1870 and 1874, Roberts studied the dissolution of bacteria in cultures contaminated by a mold. He specifically studied the impact of Penicillium glaucum, a close relative of the Penicillium notatum. For this work, Roberts earned the Cameron Prize for Therapeutics of the University of Edinburgh.

See Discoveries of anti-bacterial effects of penicillium moulds before Fleming.

== Dietetics and Dyspepsia ==
In 1884, the publication of his "Dietetics and Dyspepsia" described "high feeding" and "low feeding": the diets of the upper and lower class. He speculated that diet was the reason for aristocratic capacity for intellectualism.

== Royal Commission on Opium ==
When political pressure was brought against the British government's involvement in the Sino-Indian opium trade, the 1893–1895 Royal Commission on Opium was created to investigate the drug. Sir William Roberts was the medical expert on the commission.

== Selected publications ==
- A Practical Treatise on Urinary and Renal Diseases (1876)
- Lectures on Dietetics and Dyspepsia (1885)
- Collected Contributions on Digestion and Diet (1891)
- On the Chemistry and Therapeutics of Uric Acid Gravel and Gout (1892)
