= Penicillium lacus-sarmientei =

Scientific classification
- Kingdom: Fungi
- Division: Ascomycota
- Class: Eurotiomycetes
- Order: Eurotiales
- Family: Aspergillaceae
- Genus: Penicillium
- Species: P. lacus-sarmientei

Binomial name
- Penicillium lacus-sarmientei Ramírez, C. 1986

Type strain
- ACTT 64255, ATCC 64255, CBS 685.85, CCF 2036, IJFM 19078, KCTC 6552

Species of fungus

Penicillium lacus-sarmientei is an anamorph species of the genus of Penicillium which was isolated from soil of the shores of the Lake Sarmiento in the Chilean Tierra del Fuego.
