= Penicillium bilaiae =

Scientific classification
- Domain: Eukaryota
- Kingdom: Fungi
- Division: Ascomycota
- Class: Eurotiomycetes
- Order: Eurotiales
- Family: Aspergillaceae
- Genus: Penicillium
- Species: P. bilaiae

Binomial name
- Penicillium bilaiae Chalab.

Species of fungus

Penicillium bilaiae is a species of native soil fungus that can be used as a PGPM (plant growth-promoting microorganism). R. Kucey first identified that organic acids excreted by the microorganism can solubilize soil-bound phosphate. The organism can live in symbiosis with several plant species by enhancing phosphate uptake by the root structure while feeding off plant waste products. Native soil populations are often low and can be increased by application as an agricultural inoculant.

The species name bilaiae is a transliteration of the Ukrainian scientist Prof. Vera Bilai for whom it is named in 1950 by Chalabuda T.V., Zabolotny Institute of Microbiology and Virology National Academy of Sciences of Ukraine, Kiev, Ukraine. Alternative spellings published in the literature are bilaji or bilaii.
