= Penicillium canescens =

Scientific classification
- Kingdom: Fungi
- Division: Ascomycota
- Class: Eurotiomycetes
- Order: Eurotiales
- Family: Aspergillaceae
- Genus: Penicillium
- Species: P. canescens

Binomial name
- Penicillium canescens Sopp, O.J. 1912

Type strain
- ATCC 10419, BCRC 32726, Biourge 113, CBS 300.48, CCRC 32726, CTC 6607, DSM 1215, FRR 0910, IAM 13693, IMI 028260, JCM 22758, KCTC 6430, MUCL 29169, NCTC 6607, NRRL 910, QM 7550, Thom, 2654, VKM F-1148

Synonyms
- Penicillium kapuscinskii

Species of fungus

Penicillium canescens is an anamorph fungus species of the genus of Penicillium which was isolated from soil of the United Kingdom. Penicillium canescens produces the antibiotic canescin.

== See also ==
- List of Penicillium species
