= Cimetière du Grand Jas =

Cemetery in the French Riviera

Coordinates: 43°33′36″N 7°0′12″E

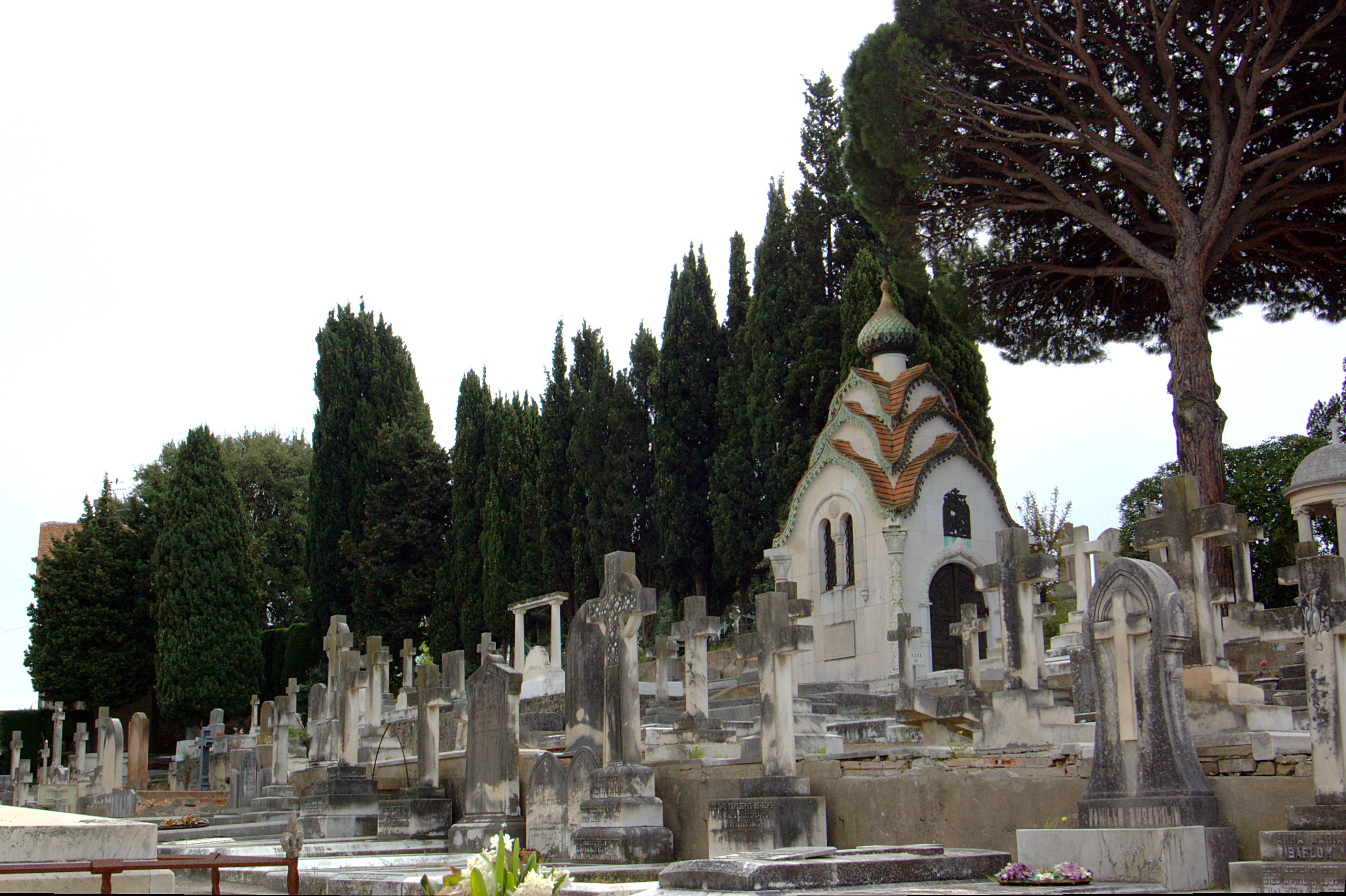
- View of the cemetery with the family von Derwies' chapel
- Interactive map of Cimetière du Grand Jas

Details
- Established: 1866
- Location: Cannes
- Country: France
- Size: 9 hectares (22 acres)

The Cimetière du Grand Jas (Grand Jas Cemetery) is located at 205 avenue de Grasse in Cannes on the French Riviera. The nine hectare terraced cemetery began operations in 1866 and is known for its landscaped architecture with rich floral decorations and statuary.

Its "English square", or Cimetière Anglais, is the final resting place for a number of English people who made Cannes their home. It is dominated by the statue of Henry Peter Brougham, 1st Baron Brougham and Vaux who played a major role in building the city. The cemetery contains one Commonwealth war grave, of a World War I officer of the King's Royal Rifle Corps.

There is a significant Cenotaph in the Cimetière Anglais (also called the Ex-Protestant Cemetery) in memory of Prince Leopold, Duke of Albany (1853-1884), youngest son of Queen Victoria and Prince Albert, who died in Cannes and was then buried in St George's Chapel, Windsor Castle. Queen Victoria made a personal visit to the site in 1887, where, according to the inscription on the monument, she "declared it well and prettily kept".

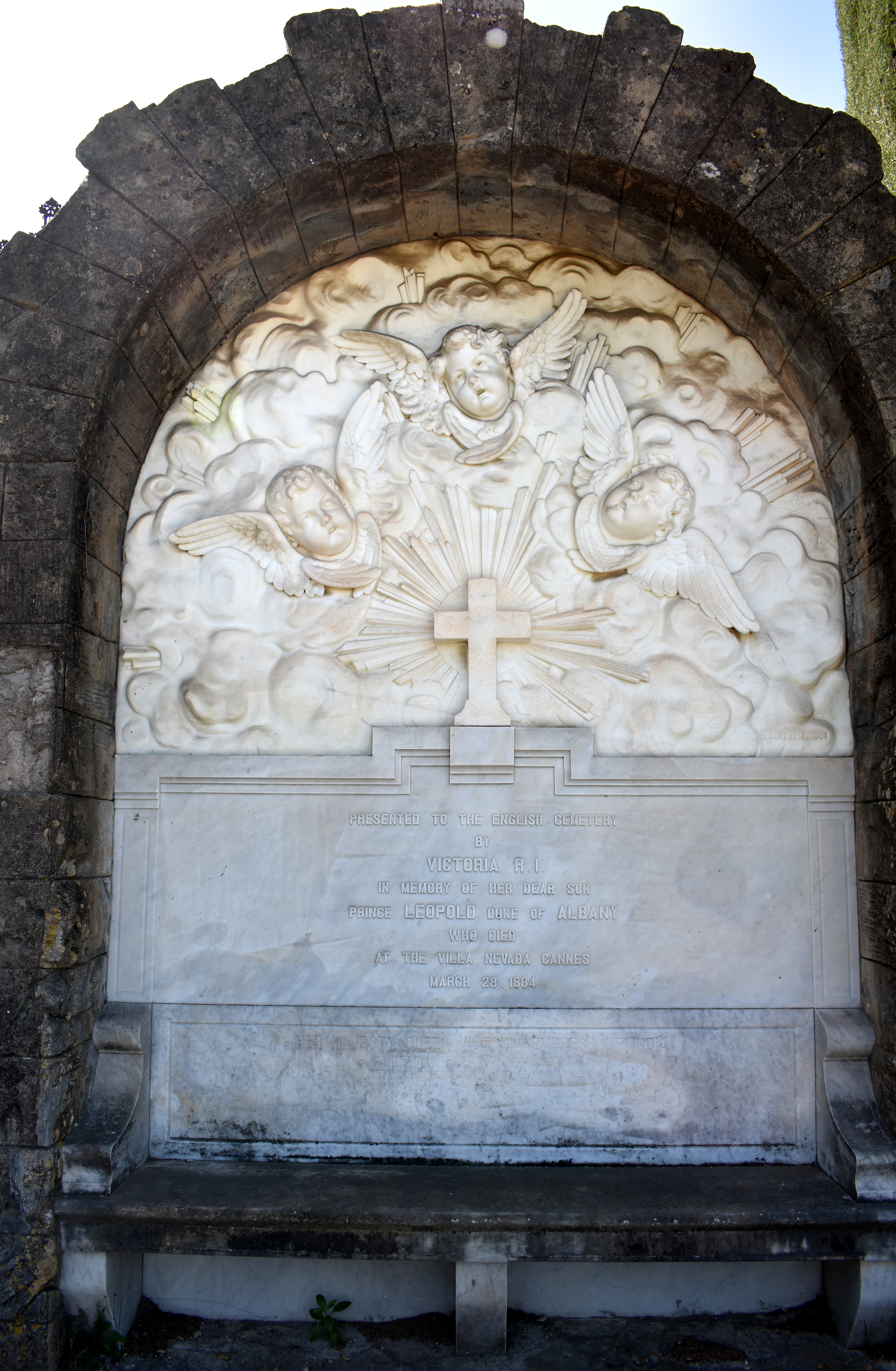
Memorial for Prince Leopold, Duke of Albany

== Notable interments ==
- Alexandra Albedinskaya (1834-1913), Russian lady-in-waiting and former mistress of Emperor Alexander II of Russia
- Augustus Anson (1835–1877), Victoria Cross recipient and former British member of parliament
- Henry Peter Brougham (1778–1868), British lawyer, statesman, builder of Cannes
- Eugène Brieux (1858–1932), dramatist
- Jorge Cuevas Bartholín (1885–1961), American ballet school founder, husband of Margaret Rockefeller Strong de Larraín, Marquesa de Cuevas
- John Francis Campbell (1821–1885), Scottish author and scholar
- Martine Carol (1922–1967), actress
- Jean Gabriel Domergue (1889–1962), painter, poster artist
- Henry Eeles Dresser (1838–1915), ornithologist and author
- Ernest Duchesne (1874–1912), medical scientist
- Peter Carl Fabergé (1846–1920), Russian jewellery designer
- Nancy Fish (1850–1927), English socialite, second wife of P. T. Barnum
- Georges Guétary (1915–1997), singer, actor
- Olga Khoklova (1891–1955), Russian ballerina (Picasso's first wife)
- Apo Lazaridès (1925–1998), champion cyclist
- Klaus Mann (1906–1949), German writer. Son of writer Thomas Mann.

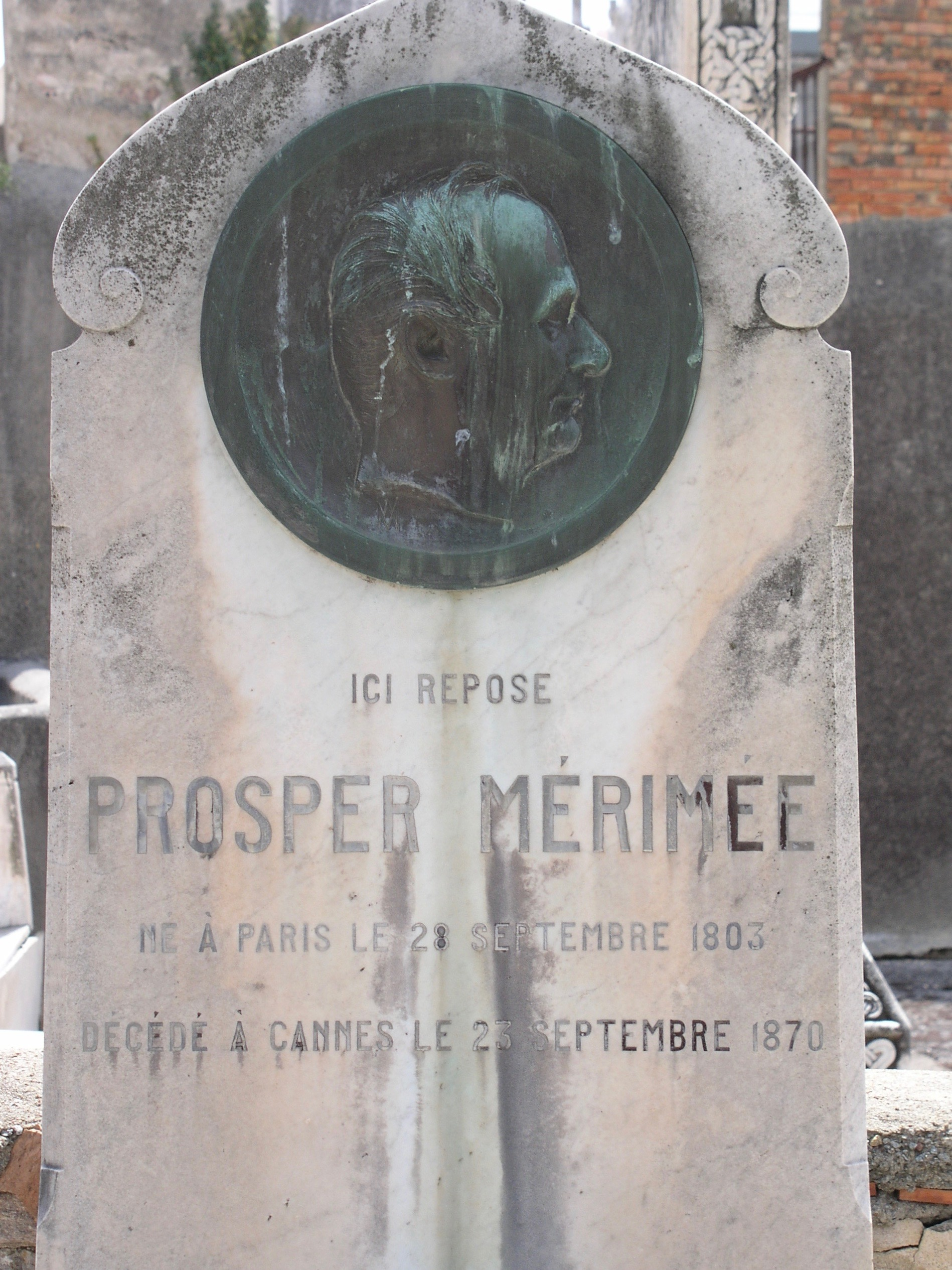
Prosper Mérimée's tomb

- Prosper Mérimée (1803–1870), writer
- Jacques Monod (1910–1976), biochemist, Nobel Prize winner
- Marquis de Morès (1858–1896), adventurer
- Sir Arthur Paget (1851-1928), British Army officer
- Arthur Frederick Pickard (1844–1880), Victoria Cross recipient.
- Lily Pons (1898–1976), opera singer
- Emmanuel Signoret (1872–1900), poet
- John Fitzwilliam Stairs (1848–1904), Canadian entrepreneur and statesman
- Marcel Thil (1904–1968), world boxing champion
- Paul von Thurn und Taxis, aka Paul de Fels (1843–1879), Impresario and former Aide-de-Camp of Ludwig II of Bavaria
- Laurent Vianay (1843–1928), architect
- William Bonaparte Wyse (1826–1892), Irish poet, entomologist
