= Penicillium waksmanii =

Scientific classification
- Kingdom: Fungi
- Division: Ascomycota
- Class: Eurotiomycetes
- Order: Eurotiales
- Family: Aspergillaceae
- Genus: Penicillium
- Species: P. waksmanii

Binomial name
- Penicillium waksmanii Zalessky, K.M. 1927

Type strain
- ATCC 10516, Biourge 286, CBS 230.28, CBS 23028, CGMCC 3.4482, CMI 39746, FRR 0777, IAM 13704, IFO 7737, IMI 039746, IMI 039746i, IMI 039746iii, IMI 089984, JCM 22766, KCTC 6263, MUCL 29120, NBRC 7737, NRRL 777, QM 7681, Thom 5010.36

Synonyms
- Penicillium griseoazureum

Species of fungus

Penicillium waksmanii is an anamorph species of the genus of Penicillium which was isolated from the alga Sargassum ringgoldianum. Penicillium waksmanii produces pyrenocine A, pyrenocine C, pyrenocine D and pyrenocine E
