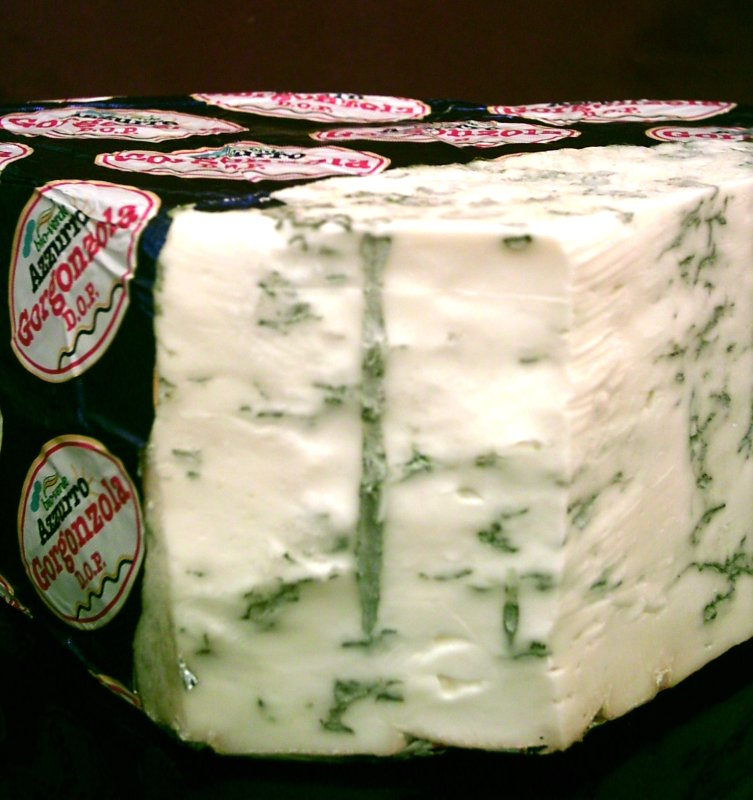
- Gorgonzola, an Italian cheese containing "veins" of Penicillium glaucum

Scientific classification
- Kingdom: Fungi
- Division: Ascomycota
- Class: Eurotiomycetes
- Order: Eurotiales
- Family: Aspergillaceae
- Genus: Penicillium
- Species: P. glaucum

Binomial name
- Penicillium glaucum Link

= Penicillium glaucum =

Mold used in the making of some blue cheeses

Penicillium glaucum is a mold that is used in the making of some types of blue cheese, including Bleu de Gex, Rochebaron, and some varieties of Bleu d'Auvergne and Gorgonzola. (Other blue cheeses, including Bleu de Bresse, Brebiblu, Cambozola, Cashel Blue, Danish blue, Fourme d'Ambert, Fourme de Montbrison, Lanark Blue, Roquefort, Shropshire Blue, and Stilton use Penicillium roqueforti.)

In 1874, Sir William Roberts, a physician from Manchester, noted that cultures of the mold inhibited the growth of bacteria. Louis Pasteur would build on this discovery, noting that Bacillus anthracis would not grow in the presence of the related mold Penicillium notatum. Its antibiotic powers were independently discovered and tested on animals by French physician Ernest Duchesne, but his thesis in 1897 was ignored by the Pasteur Institute.

P. glaucum was found by Pasteur to feed on only one enantiomer of tartaric acid, L-(+)-tartaric acid, which makes its use the earliest example of kinetic resolution.
