= Environmental xenobiotic =

Class of pollutants that have unwanted pharmacological effects on organisms

Environmental xenobiotics are xenobiotic compounds with a biological activity that are found as pollutants in the natural environment.

== Pharmaceuticals ==
Pharmaceutical drugs are chemicals used for the alteration, diagnosis, prevention and treatment of disease, health conditions or structure/function of the human body. Some pharmaceutically active compounds (PhACs) can enter the environment by one route or another as the parent compound or as pharmacologically active metabolites. Drugs are developed with the intention of having a beneficial biological effect on the organism to which they are administered, but many such compounds all too often pass into the environment where they may exert an unwanted biological effect.

For many years PhACs have been all but ignored as environmental researchers concentrated on the well known environmentally dangerous chemicals that were/are largely used in agriculture and industry. But with increasing technology to help in the separation and identification of multiple compounds in a mixture, PhACs and their effects have received increasing attention. PhACs have not (until relatively recently) been seen as potentially toxic because regulations associated with pharmaceuticals are typically overseen by human health organizations which have limited experience with environmental issues.

Nearly all categories of pharmaceuticals including pain killers (analgesics and anti-inflammatory), antibiotics (antibacterial), anticonvulsant drugs, beta blockers, blood lipid regulators, X-ray contrast media, cytostatic drugs (chemotherapy), oral contraceptives, and veterinary pharmaceuticals among many others have been found in the environment.

== Sources and origins ==
PhACs can be entered into the environment in two main ways; direct and indirect. Indirect sources are PhACs that have performed their biologically intended effect and are passed onto the environment in either their complete or a modified state.

PhAC's can be discharged directly by manufacturers of the pharmaceuticals or effluents from hospitals. However with increasing regulation by local, state and federal regulating agencies, direct discharge is becoming much less of an issue.

There are also several indirect sources of PhACs into the environment. One common indirect source of PhACs into the environment is the passing of antibiotics, anesthetics and growth promoting hormones by domesticated animals in urine and manure. This is often stored in large pits before being pumped and applied to fields as fertilizers where many of the PhACs can be washed away by rainfall to aquatic environments.

Family pets can also be an indirect source of PhACs into the environment.

Most of the PhACs in the environment however come from human sources. A direct human source is leachate from a landfill. Often the pharmaceuticals that are located in landfills are found in their original, most chemically active state.

Most pharmaceuticals are administered and passed through the human body in one of three ways:

1. Metabolized partially or completely within the body and made inactive (Ideal)
2. Partially metabolized and passed through the system
3. Passed through the body unmodified (Worst Case Scenario). In any manner PhACs are then passed to sewage treatment plants (STPs), where facilities are designed to break down natural human waste by microbial degradation. However, many PhACs are of very complex structure and are incompletely broken down in STPs before they are passed into the environment.

== Fate in environment ==
Once PhACs are entered into the environment they suffer one of three fates:

1. Biodegradation into carbon dioxide and water.
2. Undergo some form of degradation and form metabolites.
3. Persist in the environment unmodified. The amount of the compound that is broken down depends on several factors such as bioavailability and compound structure among many others.

== Effects ==
Because PhACs have come into the limelight relatively recently their effects on the environment are not completely understood. PhACs are also not generally intended to come in contact with the environment, and therefore are not typically tested environmentally prior to release. Therefore several tests are required to determine the different mechanisms and side effects of PhACs in the environment making testing largely impractical.

Many PhACs have very broad modes of action in humans. Similar, subtle reactions may occur in organisms in the environment that are not easily seen by humans. Highly specific mechanisms in humans may solicit profound effects at extremely low concentrations. Many effects may not necessarily be readily detectable and lead to ecological change that would be erroneously attributed to natural change. This said there are several effects that have been identified in the literature.

One long term, possibly irreversible effect is microbiological resistance to antibiotics (antibiotic resistance). Some bacteria may be able to survive when administered antibiotics (especially at low concentrations). Those colonies will multiply and produce new colonies that are resistant to that particular antibiotic and will not succumb the next time antibiotics are administered. Because rivers and streams are ever flowing objects they are an ideal pathway for antibiotics to reach bacteria and therefore provide a source and reservoir for resistant strains to develop and establish themselves.

Another recent discovery is endocrine disruptors. Endocrine disruptors can replace or disturb the balance of hormones within an organism and have been found to be occurring in waters with a concentration in the ng/L level for certain compounds. Some possible effects of endocrine disruptors are male and female sterility, feminization of males, masculinization of females and abnormal testes growth among many others. The exact pathway of occurrence of endocrine disruptors is not completely certain, however several pathways have been proposed.

Typically PhACs are found in low concentrations, (<1 ug/L) making acute toxicity effects fairly unlikely. However, because of their continual input to the environment it is possible for chronic toxicity effects to occur. One major area of concern with several compounds being present at low levels at the same time is what happens when the compounds mix? It is possible and truly likely that these mixtures will have additive, neutralistic or synergistic effects. But again testing would be both time consuming and very expensive to test all of the combined effects.

== Common pharmaceutically active compounds found in the environment ==
=== Analgesics (anti-inflammatory and antipyretic) ===
1. Acetaminophen
2. Acetylsalicylic Acid
3. Diclofenac
4. Codeine
5. Ibuprofen

=== Antibiotics ===
1. Macrolide Antibiotics
2. Sulfonamides
3. Fluoroquinolones
4. Chloramphenicol
5. Tylosin
6. Trimethoprim
7. Erythromycin
8. Lincomycin
9. Sulfamethoxazole
10. Trimethoprim

=== Anticonvulsant ===
1. Carbamazepine
2. Primidone

=== Beta-blockers ===
1. Metoprolol
2. Propanolol
3. Betaxolol
4. Bisoprolol
5. Nadolol

=== X-ray media ===
1. Iopromide
2. Iopamidol
3. Iohexol
4. Diatrizoate

=== Cytostatics (chemotherapy drugs) ===
1. Cyclophosphamide
2. Mycophenolic acid
3. Ifosfamide
4. Bicalutamide
5. Epirubicin

=== Steroids and hormones ===
1. 17α-ethinylestradiol
2. Mestranol
3. 19-norethisterone
