= Bleu d'Auvergne =

French blue cheese

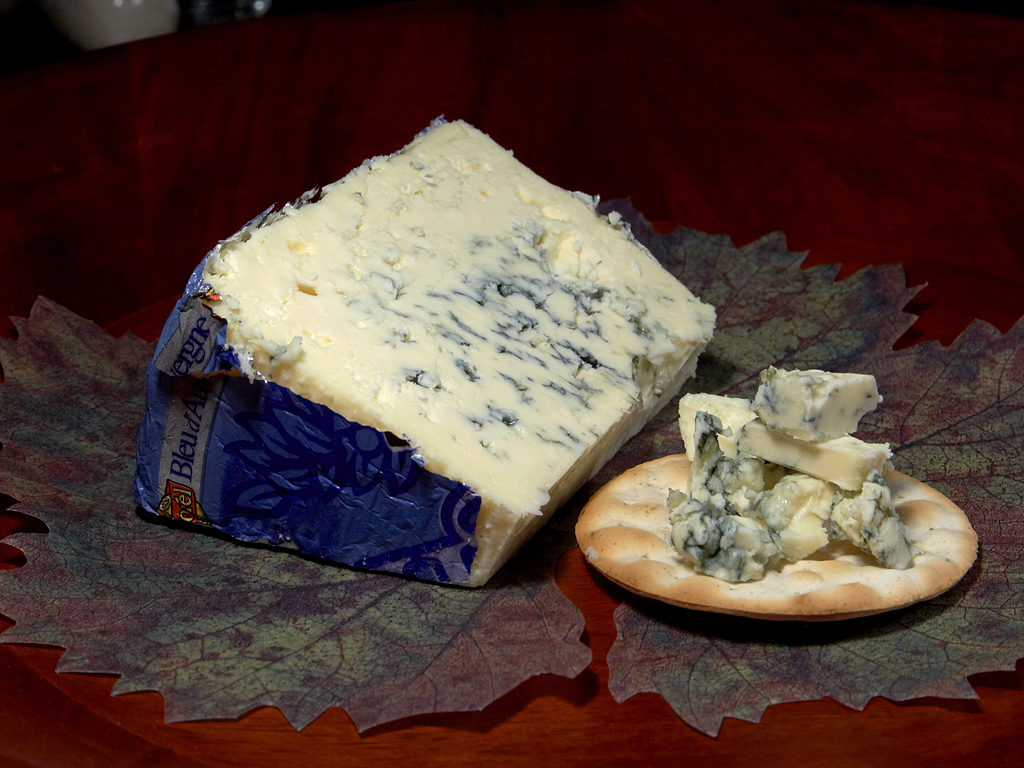
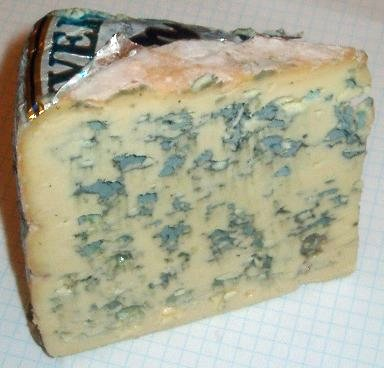
- Bleu d'Auvergne Texture of Bleu d'Auvergne
- Country of origin: France
- Region: Auvergne
- Source of milk: Cow's milk
- Pasteurized: Depends on variety
- Texture: Soft
- Aging time: 2 months
- Certification: AOC Auvergne 1975

Bleu d'Auvergne (French pronunciation: [blø dovɛʁɲ]; Occitan: Blau d'Auvèrnhe) is a French blue cheese, named for its place of origin in the Auvergne region of south-central France. It is made from cow's milk, and is one of the cheeses granted the Appellation d'origine contrôlée from the French government.

Bleu d'Auvergne was developed in the mid-1850s by a French cheesemaker named Antoine Roussel. Roussel noted that the occurrence of blue molds on his curd resulted in an agreeable taste, and conducted experiments to determine how veins of such mold could be induced. After several failed tests, Roussel discovered that the application of rye bread mold created the veining, and that pricking the curd with a needle provided increased aeration. The increased oxygenation enabled the blue mold to grow in the pockets of air within the curd. Subsequently, his discovery and techniques spread throughout the region.

== Manufacturing ==
Today, bleu d'Auvergne is prepared via mechanical needling processes. It is then aged for approximately four weeks in cool, wet cellars before distribution, a relatively short period for blue cheeses.

As of 2018, this cheese is primarily produced in industrial dairies, with only one original farm-based production remaining. The refrigerated raw cow’s milk purchased by these dairies is often pasteurized before processing. Whether raw or pasteurized, the milk is mixed with Penicillium roqueforti or Penicillium glaucum, which are responsible for the blue veining, and then rennet is added. Pasteurized milk, which lacks the diverse native microbiota of raw milk, is re-inoculated with a limited selection of cultured microorganisms.

Once the curd is cut and drained, it is gently stirred to "coat the grain," initiating draining at each curd particle. It is then placed into molds to complete the draining process. Salting follows, carried out in two stages: salt is applied to the flat surfaces and then to the sides of the cheese, gradually penetrating the interior of the paste.

To allow the blue mold to develop, the cheese needs oxygen; therefore, Bleu d’Auvergne is pierced with needles upon entering the aging cellar to promote internal aeration. In 2018, traditional knitting needles had long been replaced by mechanical piercing systems that ensure even veining and a satisfactory transformation yield.

The cheeses are then aged for a minimum of four weeks in cool, humid cellars to develop their creamy texture and full flavor.

To produce one Bleu d’Auvergne cheese, approximately:

- 20 to 25 liters of milk,
- Penicillium roqueforti or Penicillium glaucum are required.

== Properties and uses ==
Bleu d'Auvergne has a strong and pungent taste, but to a lesser extent than other blue cheeses; it is less salted, with a creamier and more buttery taste and a moister texture. Some versions use a weaker form of mold, Penicillium glaucum, to create the blue veins, rather than the Penicillium roqueforti used in Roquefort and other blue cheeses.

Bleu d'Auvergne is often used in salad dressings and pasta seasonings, and it is also a good cheese for snacking. It has been stated that it pairs well with sweet wines such as dessert-style riesling and sauvignon blanc or strong, robust red wines, as well as rich, dark beer such as English barley wine or American porter, which have both the sweetness and bold flavor required to balance the cheese. Scotch whisky, particularly a peated Islay variety also pairs incredibly well with the salty, creamy cheese due to the whisky's bold, sweet and smokey flavour.

== See also ==
- List of cheeses
