= Rochebaron =

French cheese

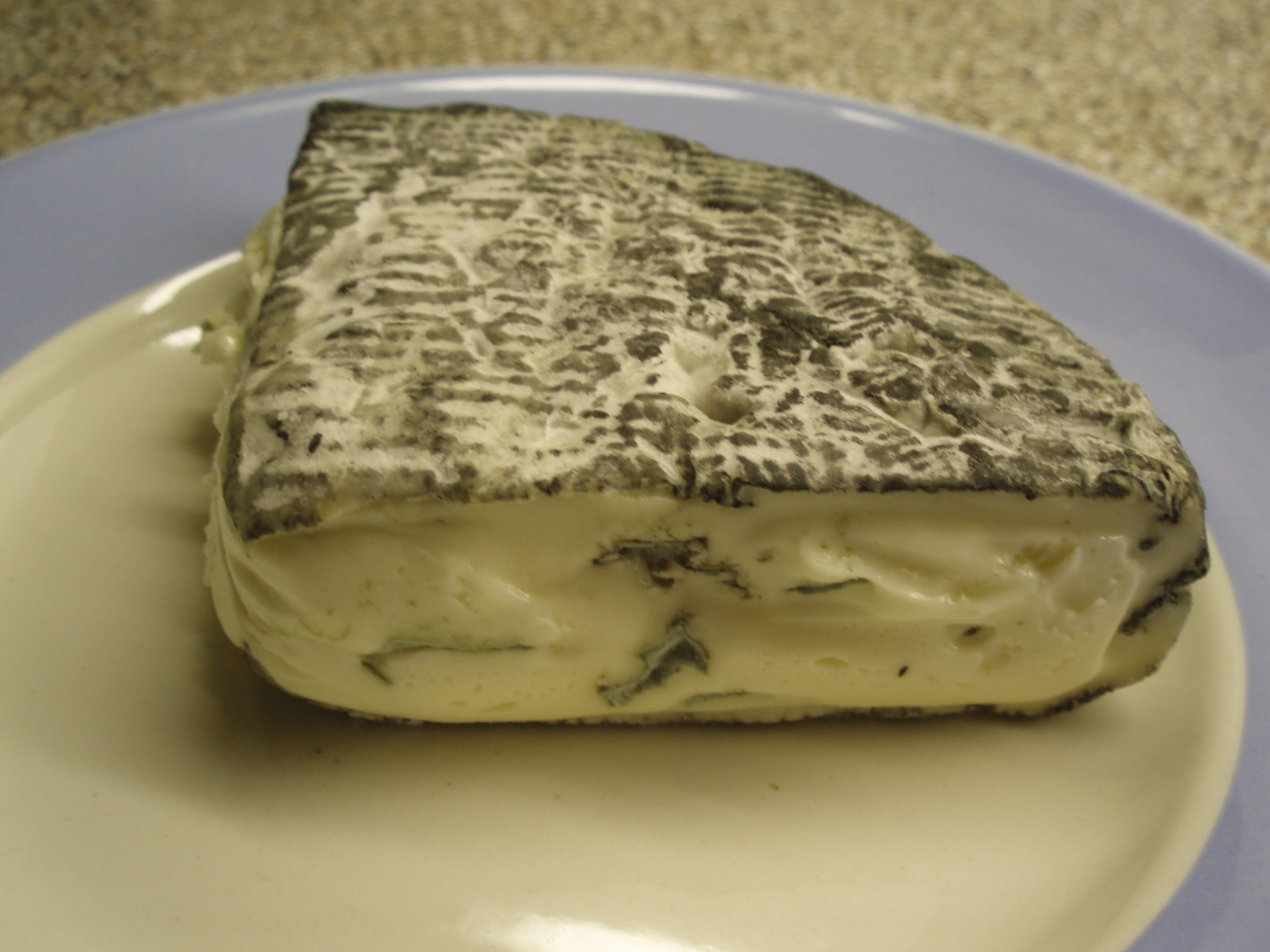
- Country of origin: France
- Region, town: Auvergne
- Source of milk: Cows
- Pasteurised: Yes
- Texture: Soft blue cheese
- Aging time: 6-8 weeks
- Certification: Not known

Rochebaron (French pronunciation: [ʁɔʃbaʁɔ̃]; Occitan: Ròcabaron) is a soft blue cheese made from pasteurised cow's milk, in the town of Beauzac in the Auvergne region, in the Massif Central, France.

This cheese is one of several that are made by curdling milk and separating the curds from the whey. Pressed into moulds, Rochebaron is then pierced with wires impregnated with Penicillium glaucum to produce blue veins through the soft whitish body of the cheese. The crust of edible ashes is dark matte grey.

Rochebaron is usually sold as a single cheese with an average weight of 600 grams (1.3 lb).

== See also ==
- List of cheeses
- List of French cheeses
