= 1,9-Pyrazoloanthrone =

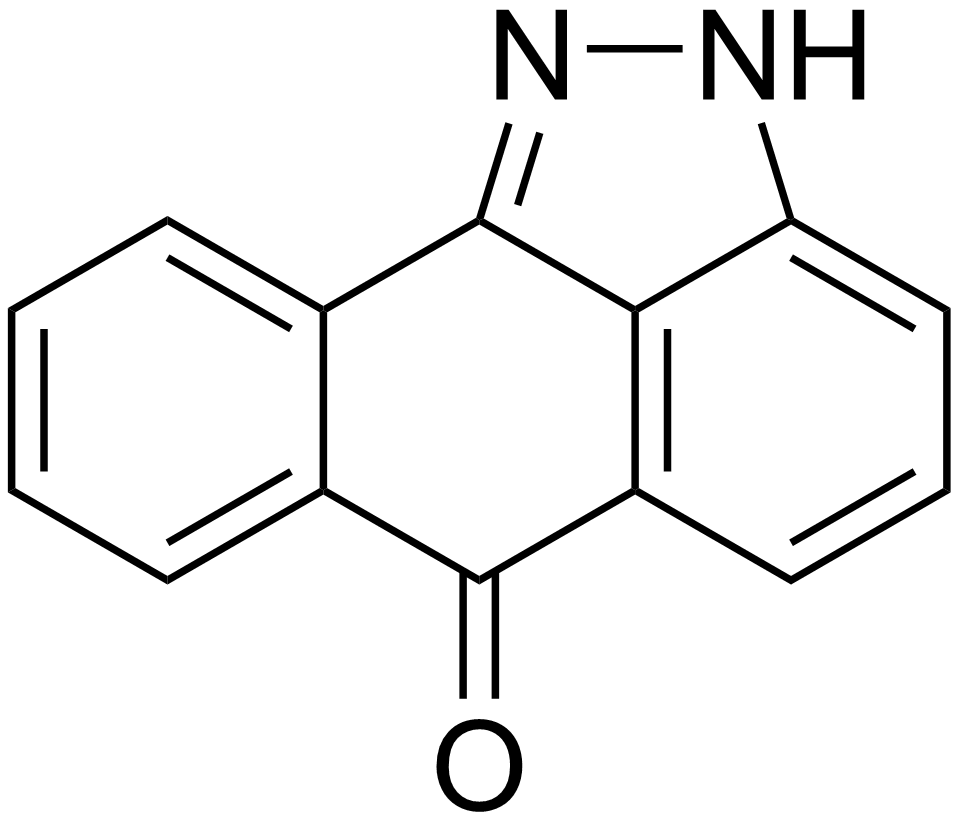

Names
- Preferred IUPAC name Dibenzo[cd,g]indazol-6(2H)-one
- Other names Anthra[1,9-cd]pyrazol-6(2H)-one; Pyrazolanthrone; Pyrazoleanthrone; SP 600125; C.I. 70300; NSC 75890

Identifiers
CAS Number	129-56-6
3D model (JSmol)	Interactive image
ChEBI	CHEBI:90695
ChEMBL	ChEMBL7064
ChemSpider	8201
DrugBank	DB01782
ECHA InfoCard	100.004.506
EC Number	204-955-6
IUPHAR/BPS	5273
PubChem CID	8515
UNII	1TW30Y2766
CompTox Dashboard (EPA)	DTXSID2040525
- InChI: InChI=1S/C14H8N2O/c17-14-9-5-2-1-4-8(9)13-12-10(14)6-3-7-11(12)15-16-13/h1-7H,(H,15,16) Key: ACPOUJIDANTYHO-UHFFFAOYSA-N; InChI=1/C14H8N2O/c17-14-9-5-2-1-4-8(9)13-12-10(14)6-3-7-11(12)15-16-13/h1-7H,(H,15,16) Key: ACPOUJIDANTYHO-UHFFFAOYAB
- SMILES: O=c2c1ccccc1c4n[nH]c3cccc2c34

Properties
Chemical formula	C_{14}H_{8}N_{2}O
Molar mass	220.231 g·mol^{−1}
Appearance	yellow
Density	1.463 g cm^{−3}
Melting point	281 to 282 °C (538 to 540 °F; 554 to 555 K)
Solubility in water	insoluble
- Except where otherwise noted, data are given for materials in their standard state (at 25 °C [77 °F], 100 kPa). verify (what is ?) Infobox references

1,9-Pyrazoloanthrone is a chemical compound that is a derivative of anthrone. It is used in biochemical studies as an inhibitor of c-Jun N-terminal kinases (JNKs).

Derivatives of 1,9-pyrazoloanthrone have a variety of biological activities. For example, 5-(aminoalkyl)amino derivatives have been investigated as anticancer agents.

== Synthesis ==
1,9-Pyrazoloanthrone can be synthesized by the condensation of 2-chloroanthraquinone with anhydrous hydrazine in pyridine at 100 °C. Purification is achieved via conversion to the N-acetyl derivative which is crystallized from acetic acid, followed by hydrolysis of the acetyl group with ammonium hydroxide in methanol.
