= Epoxyagroclavine =

Ergot alkaloid

Names
- IUPAC name 6,8β-Dimethyl-8α,9α-epoxy-10β-ergoline
- Systematic IUPAC name (1aR,3aR,9bS,9cS)-1a,3-Dimethyl-1a,2,3,3a,4,6,9b,9c-octahydroindolo[4,3-fg]oxireno[2,3-c]quinoline

Identifiers
CAS Number	82564-34-9
3D model (JSmol)	Interactive image
ChemSpider	118111
PubChem CID	133945
CompTox Dashboard (EPA)	DTXSID101002787
- InChI: InChI=1S/C16H18N2O/c1-16-8-18(2)12-6-9-7-17-11-5-3-4-10(13(9)11)14(12)15(16)19-16/h3-5,7,12,14-15,17H,6,8H2,1-2H3/t12-,14+,15+,16-/m1/s1 Key: WASFVUNJIDBCHV-SYAUCNOPSA-N
- SMILES: C[C@@]12CN([C@@H]3Cc4c[nH]c5c4c(ccc5)[C@@H]3[C@@H]1O2)C

Properties
Chemical formula	C_{16}H_{18}N_{2}O
Molar mass	254.327
- Except where otherwise noted, data are given for materials in their standard state (at 25 °C [77 °F], 100 kPa). Infobox references

Epoxyagroclavine is an ergot alkaloid made by permafrost Penicillium.
