= Citrinin =

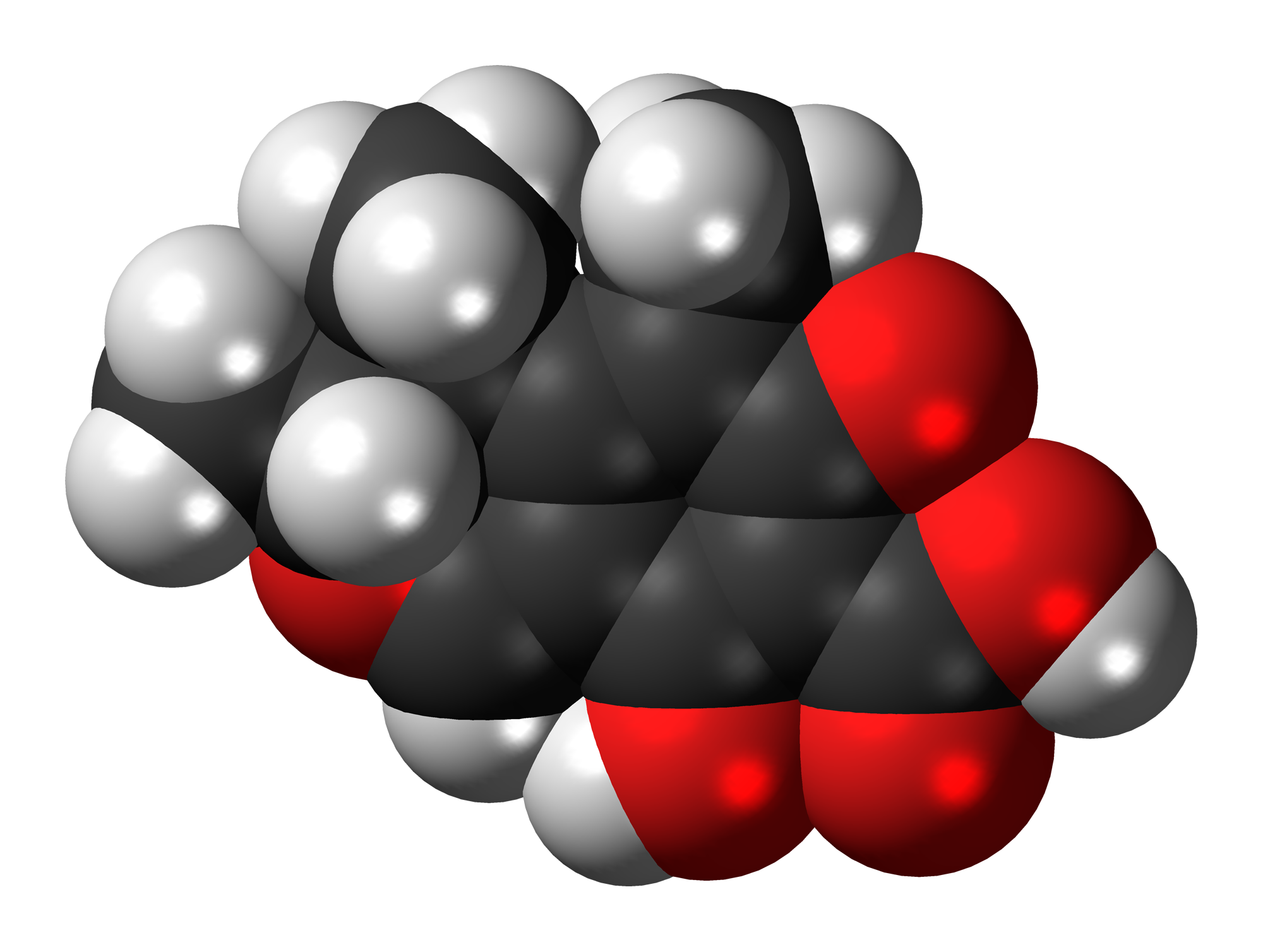

Names
- Preferred IUPAC name (3R,4S)-8-Hydroxy-3,4,5-trimethyl-6-oxo-4,6-dihydro-3H-2-benzopyran-7-carboxylic acid

Identifiers
CAS Number	518-75-2
3D model (JSmol)	Interactive image
ChEMBL	ChEMBL510139
ChemSpider	10222475
ECHA InfoCard	100.007.508
KEGG	C16765
PubChem CID	54680783
UNII	3S697X6SNZ
CompTox Dashboard (EPA)	DTXSID8020333
- InChI: InChI=1S/C13H14O5/c1-5-7(3)18-4-8-9(5)6(2)11(14)10(12(8)15)13(16)17/h4-5,7,15H,1-3H3,(H,16,17)/t5-,7-/m1/s1 Key: CQIUKKVOEOPUDV-IYSWYEEDSA-N; InChI=1/C13H14O5/c1-5-7(3)18-4-8-9(5)6(2)11(14)10(12(8)15)13(16)17/h4-5,7,15H,1-3H3,(H,16,17)/t5-,7-/m1/s1 Key: CQIUKKVOEOPUDV-IYSWYEEDBV
- SMILES: O=C2C(C(O)=O)=C(O)C1=CO[C@H](C)[C@@H](C)C1=C2C

Properties
Chemical formula	C_{13}H_{14}O_{5}
Molar mass	250.25
Appearance	Lemon-yellow crystals
Melting point	175 °C (347 °F; 448 K) (decomposes (dry conditions), when water is present 100 degrees Celsius))
Solubility in water	Insoluble

Hazards
- GHS labelling
Pictograms	(GHS06: Toxic) (GHS08: Health hazard)
Hazard statements	H301, H311, H331, H351
Precautionary statements	P261, P280, P301+P310, P311
Safety data sheet (SDS)	MSDS
- Except where otherwise noted, data are given for materials in their standard state (at 25 °C [77 °F], 100 kPa). verify (what is ?) Infobox references

Citrinin is a mycotoxin which is often found in food. It is a secondary metabolite produced by fungi that contaminates long-stored food and it can cause a variety of toxic effects, including kidney, liver and cell damage. Citrinin is mainly found in stored grains, but sometimes also in fruits and other plant products.

== History ==
Citrinin was one of the many mycotoxins discovered by H. Raistrick and A.C. Hetherington in the 1930s. In 1941 H. Raistrick and G. Smith identified citrinin to have a broad antibacterial activity. After this discovery the interest in citrinin rose. However, in 1946 A.M. Ambrose and F. DeEds demonstrated that citrinin was toxic to mammals. As a result, the interest in citrinin decreased, but there still was a lot of research. In 1948 the chemical structure was found by W.B. Whalley and coworkers. Citrinin is a natural compound and it was first isolated from Penicillium citrinum, but is also produced by other Penicillium species, such as the Monascus species and the Aspergillus species, which are both fungi. During the 1950s W.B. Whalley, A.J. Birch and others identified citrinin as a polyketide and investigated its biosynthesis using radioisotopes. During the 1980s and 1990s J. Staunton, U. Sankawa and others also investigated its biosynthesis using stable isotopes and NMR. The gene cluster expression system for citrinin was reported in 2008.

In 1993 the World Health Organisation International Agency for Research on Cancer started to evaluate the carcinogenic potential of mycotoxins. The health hazards of mycotoxins to humans or animals have been reviewed extensively in recent years. To ensure agricultural productivity and sustainability, animal and public health, animal welfare and the environment, maximum levels of undesirable substances in animal feed are laid down in the EU Directive of the European Parliament and the Council of 7 May 2002. While maximum levels for various mycotoxins were set for a number of food and feed products, the occurrence of citrinin is not regulated yet under these or other regulations within the European Union. No maximum levels have been reported yet by the Food and Agriculture Organization for citrinin in food and feed.

== Structure and reactivity ==
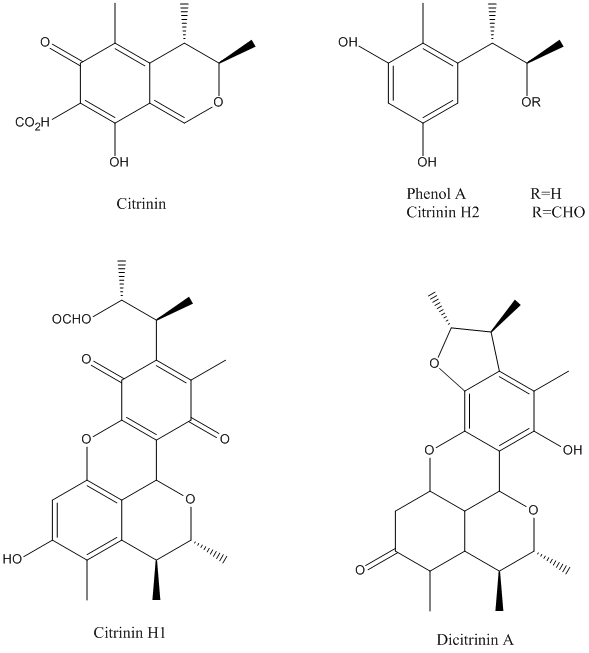
Figure 1: Structures of citrinin and its decomposition products. Based on Clark B.R. et al. (2006) [8]

Citrinin is a polyketide mycotoxin, which is a secondary metabolite of some fungi species. Its IUPAC name is (3R,4S)-4,6-dihydro-8-hydroxy-3,4,5-trimethyl-6-oxo-3H-2-benzopyran-7-carboxylic acid and the molecular formula is C_{13}H_{14}O_{5}. Citrinin has a molecular weight of 250.25 g/mol. It forms disordered yellow crystals which melt at 175 °C. Citrinin is a planar molecule which contains conjugated bonds. As a result of these conjugated bonds citrinin is autofluorescent. Citrinin is almost insoluble in cold water but displays better solubility in polar organic solvents and aqueous solutions of sodium hydroxide, sodium carbonate and sodium acetate.

As stated above, citrinin decomposes at temperatures higher than 175 °C, providing that it is under dry conditions. When water is present, the decomposition temperature is around 100 °C. Several decomposition products of citrinin are known, including phenol A, citrinin H1, citrinin H2 and dicitrinin A. The structures of the decomposition products are shown in figure 1, depicted on the left. Citrinin H1 is produced out of two citrinin molecules and its toxicity is increased compared to the original toxicity of citrinin. Citrinin H2, a formylated derivative of phenol A, is less toxic than citrinin. Phenol A seems to be produced mainly under acidic conditions. Dicitrinin A is a dimer of citrinin molecules which is mainly formed during decomposition in a neutral environment, when a high concentration of citrinin is present.

The way citrinin reacts in the body is not understood yet and its intermediates during biotransformation are also not known.

=== Coexposure with ochratoxin A ===
Citrinin often occurs together with other mycotoxins like ochratoxin A or aflatoxin B1, because they are produced by the same fungi species. The combination which is observed most often is citrinin with ochratoxin A and this is also the most studied combination. The effects of co-occurrence of these mycotoxins are either additive or synergistic. The nephrotoxic effects of ochratoxin A and citrinin, for example, are increased synergistic when exposure to both takes place. Next to that, the co-exposure of these compounds is expected to be involved in the pathogenesis of a human kidney disease, called Balkan Endemic Nephropathy. The interaction of both substances might also influence apoptosis and necrosis in hepatocytes.

== Presence in food and exposure ==
The existing information on occurrence of citrinin in food suggests that relatively high citrinin concentrations can be found in stored grains and grain-based products. Because of this and the fact that people in general have a high consumption of cereal-based foods, the Panel on Contaminants in the Food Chain (the CONTAM Panel) considered that grains might be the major contributor of dietary exposure to citrinin. The CONTAM Panel concluded that not enough data were available in the literature to carry out a dietary exposure assessment.

Another way to be exposed to citrinin is through inhalation and skin contact. However, the extent of possible health hazards caused by inhaled citrinin or through dermal exposure of citrinin is largely unclear. Researchers found that citrinin is also used in indoor materials. When analyzing 79 bulk samples, they found that citrinin was present in three of them, with a concentration range between 20 and 35000 ng/g. Also, other mycotoxins were present in several samples.

== Toxicity ==
There are different types of toxicity. The types of toxicity that have been studied for citrinin are acute toxicity, nephrotoxicity, genotoxicity and its carcinogenicity.

=== Acute toxicity ===
The acute toxicity of citrinin depends on the route of administration and on the species used for the research. Oral administration required the highest dose for lethality and the LD50 of this administration route is 134 mg/kg bodyweight (b.w.) for rabbit. Intravenous administration required the lowest dose for lethality. The LD50 is 19 mg/kg b.w. in rabbits. Intraperitoneal the LD50 is 50 mg/kg b.w. for rabbit. Subcutaneous the LD50 is 37 mg/kg b.w. for guinea-pig. Via crop the LD50 is 57 mg/kg bodyweight for ducklings.

=== Nephrotoxicity and carcinogenicity ===
In a study with male rats, it was found that the rats showed an increased ratio of kidney weight to body weight after an exposure of 70 mg citrinin/kg b.w. for 32 weeks and an increase in the ratio of liver weight to body weight after an exposure of 80 weeks. After an exposure of 40 weeks to citrinin the rats also showed small adenomas.

=== Genotoxicity ===
In mammalian cells in vitro, citrinin did not induce DNA single-strand breaks, oxidative DNA damage or sister chromatids exchanges but induced micronuclei, aneuploidy and chromosomal aberrations. In vivo it induced chromosome abnormalities and hypodiploidy in the bone marrow of mice. This indicates that citrinin is mutagenic.

== Biosynthesis ==
Citrinin is biosynthesized by fungi species of Penicillium, Monascus and Aspergillus. For the production of citrinin, a minimal set of genes is needed. These genes are conserved in most species which produce citrinin. They are citS, mrl1, mrl2, mrl4, mrl6, and mrl7. CitS produces a citrinin synthase (CitS). The product of the mrl1 gene is a serine hydrolase (CitA), but its function is not known yet. Mrl2 encodes a non heme Fe(II) dependent oxygenase (CitB) which is involved in ring expansion. A NAD(P)^{+} dependent aldehyde dehydrogenase (CitD) is encoded by mrl4 and another dehydrogenase (CitE) is encoded by mrl6. The mrl7 gene encodes for a NAD(P)^{+} dependent oxidoreductase (CitC).

The first step of citrinin biosynthesis in fungi is the binding of citrinin synthase to the starting compound, a thiol ester. After that the serine hydrolase, encoded by mrl1, forms a ketoaldehyde at which CitB can work. CitB oxidizes the C-atom of a methyl group bound to the aromatic ring and produces an alcohol. The oxidoreductase encoded by mrl7 converts this alcohol into a bisaldehyde. Then CitD converts it into a carboxylic acid, via a thiohemiacetal intermediate which rises as a result of the transfer of hydride from NADPH. The last step is the reduction of a carbon atom by CitE, after which citrinin is released. During this pathway also several side product are released.

Aspergillus oryzae has been transformed to efficiently industrially produce citrinin, which is not normally one of its SMs.

== Mechanism of action ==
Various in vitro studies have revealed the involvement of citrinin toxicity in reduced cytokine production, inhibition of RNA and DNA synthesis, induction of oxidative stress, inhibition of nitride oxide gene expression, increase in ROS production and activation of apoptotic cell death via signal transduction pathways and the caspase-cascade system.

=== Cytokine production and cell viability ===
Johannessen et al. (2007) investigated the production of cytokine and cell viability in response to citrinin treatment. Levels of TGFβ1 along with cell viability were reduced to 90% of control levels when incubated 48 h with 25 μg/mL citrinin. Incubation with 50 μg/mL for 48 hours and 72 hours further reduced TGFβ1 and cell viability levels to 40% and 20% of control values.

Further Johannessen found that levels of IL-6 were reduced to 90% when exposed to 25 μg/mL citrinin (CTN) and to 40% when exposed to 50 μg/mL. Levels of IL-8 and cell viability were also reduced to 80% and 20% when exposed to respectively 25 and 50 μg/mL CTN for 72 hours. These results show that pleiotropic cytokine TGFβ1 and pro-inflammatory cytokines were (slightly) decreased when exposed to increasing doses of CTN. IL-6 and IL-8 however remained mostly at non-toxic concentrations.

=== Effect on cell viability and apoptosis ===
Yu et al. (2006) investigated the effect of CTN on cell viability for a HL-60 cell line. When exposed to 25 μM CTN for 24 hours, no significant decrease was found. However, when incubated to higher amounts, 50 and 75 μM, the overall viability dropped to 51% and 22% of control levels respectively.

Chan (2007) also tested the effect of citrinin on cell viability, but in an embryonic stem cell line (ESC-B5) in vitro. The ESC-B5 cells were treated with 10–30 μM CTN for 24 hours and a dose-dependent reduction in cell viability was found. Chan further determined that this reduction in cell viability was due to apoptosis and not necrosis as CTN exposure led to an increase of nuclear DNA fragmentation or breakdown of chromatin, which are both characteristics of apoptosis.

Other indications that the reduction of cell viability is caused by citrinin induced apoptosis are: increased ROS production in ESC-B5, increased Bax and decreased Bcl2, release of cytochrome c in the cytosol, stimulation of caspase-cascade (increasing activity of caspase-3, −6, −7 and −9). Moreover, Huang found that JNK and PAK2 (both associated with apoptosis) were activated in a dose-dependent manner after CTN treatment of osteoblasts. Huang further investigated the role of JNK and ROS by suppressing JNK activation with a JNK inhibitor (SP600125) and found a significant reduction in caspase-3 and apoptosis, but no effect on ROS generation. These results suggest that ROS is an upstream activator of JNK and can possibly control caspase-3 to trigger apoptosis when treated with CTN.

=== Effect on immune response ===
Mycotoxins in general can either stimulate or suppress immune responses. Liu et al. (2010) investigated the role of CTN on nitric oxide (NO) production, a proinflammatory mediator, in MES-13 (glomerular mesangial cells from an SV40 transgenic mouse) cells.

It has been found that endotoxin LPS and inflammatory mediators as IFN-γ, TNF-α and IL-1β can induce iNOS (NO synthesis enzyme) gene expression by activating transcription factors including NF-κB and STAT1a.

When exposed to CTN the NO production reduced in a dose-responsive manner and this was not due to reduction in cell viability as still 95% of cells were alive while the NO production dropped with 20 or 40% for 15 and 25 μM. Expression of iNOS protein was found to be reduced when treated with CTN in comparison to cells treated with LPS/INF-γ on both RNA and protein level. CTN also reduced STAT-1a phosphorylation and IRF-1 (a transcription factor that is targeted by STAT-1a and can bind to the IRE of the iNOS gene) mRNA levels.

Furthermore, Liu et al.. (2010) found that addition of CTN caused lower DNA binding activity between NF-κB and LPS/IFN-y resulting in a reduction of nuclear NF-κB protein. Phosphorylation of IκB-α, an upstream inhibitor of NF-κB, was also reduced upon addition of CTN. These results suggest that CTN inhibits iNOS gene expression through suppression of NF-κB by blocking IκB-α phosphorylation.

== Metabolism of citrinin ==
Reddy et al. (1982) described the distribution and metabolism of [^{14}C]Citrinin in pregnant rats. These rats were subcutaneously administered with 35 mg/kg C-labeled citrinin on day 12 of pregnancy. From plasma concentrations it could be concluded that radioactivity rapidly disappeared after 12 hours and eventually only 0.9% was left. A total recovery of 98% was found 72 hours after administration in several tissues and the percentages of reactivity found in liver, gastrointestinal tract (mostly small intestine), kidney, uterus and fetus are listed in the table 1 below.

Table 1: Distribution of citrinin through tissues

	Liver	GI	Kidney	Uterus	Fetus
30 minutes after dosing	9.5%	6.8%	3.5%	0.4%	0.26%
72 hours after dosing	1.3%	0.85%	0.1%	0.05%	0.04%

Most of the radioactively labeled citrinin (77%) was excreted via urine. About 21% was found in feces, this was a late effect as no radioactivity was found after 30 minutes and only 3% after 6 hours. Therefore, the presence of 6.8% radioactivity in the gastrointestinal tract after 30 minutes probably reflected the secreted label by the liver and underwent enterohepatic circulation before ending up in the intestine.

=== Metabolites ===
At 1 hour after dosing, one metabolite (A) was found in plasma using HPLC. The retention times of parent compound citrinin (C) and this metabolite (A) were 270 and 176 seconds, respectively. The metabolite was more polar than citrinin. Urine samples at different times yielded two metabolites at 180 (A) and 140 (B) seconds, which were both more polar than CTN. Bile samples taken 3 hours after dosing yielded a retention time of 140 seconds, indicating metabolite B. Uterus extracts yielded metabolite A (retention time: 180 seconds) and fetus yielded no metabolite, only the parent compound citrinin. These results suggest that only the parent compound, which is found in plasma and uterus, can enter the fetus and the metabolite (A), also present in plasma and uterus, does not. This can be because the metabolite was more polar and can thereby not cross the placental barrier.

In comparison with male rats, two metabolites were found in urine, plasma, and bile with similar retention times and more polar appearance than the parent compound. These results suggest the liver as origin for citrinin metabolism in male rats.

=== Citrinin and dihydrocitrinon in urines of German adults ===
A recent study of Ali et al. (2015) investigated the levels of citrinin (CTN) and its human metabolite dihydrocitrinone (HO-CTN) in urine samples of 50 healthy adults (27 females and 23 males). Citrinin and its major metabolite could positively be detected in respectively 82% and 84% of all urine samples. The levels measured for CTN ranged from 0.02 (limit of detection, LOD) to 0.08 ng/mL and for HO-CTN from 0.05 (LOD) to 0.51 ng/mL. The average urine level was 0.03 ng/mL for CTN and 0.06 ng/mL for HO-CTN. When adjusted to creatinine content, 20.2 ng/g crea (CTN) and 60.9 ng/g crea (HO-CTN) it was clear that the appearance of the metabolite in urine is 3x higher. This suggests that urine can potentially be used as an additional biomarker for citrinin exposure.

== Efficacy ==
Many people have a high consumption of grain products and as citrinin is found in grain products, this can lead to high consumption of citrinin. There is a concern about the concentration of citrinin that causes nephrotoxicity. Based on the report of the European Food Safety Authority, the critical citrinin concentration from children (up to 3–9 years old) is 53 μg/kg of grains and grain-based products while 19 to 100 μg/kg is for adults. Unfortunately, there is no firm conclusion for the exact citrinin concentration that can cause nephrotoxicity for long periods of consumption.

== Adverse effect ==
Research has shown that the kidney is the main target organ of citrinin. It shows change in histopathology and mild morbidity of the rat's kidney. Citrinin causes a disruption of the renal function in rats, which shows that there is an accumulation of the citrinin in kidney tissue. It is also shown that citrinin is transported into renal proximal tubular cells. An organic anion transporter is required for this transportation process. Recent studies show that the mitochondria respiratory system is another target of citrinin. Citrinin can interfere with the electron transport system, Ca^{2+} fluxes and membrane permeability.

Also several experiments have been conducted in livestocks, such as pigs and chickens, to see the effect of citrinin.

=== Experiments on pigs ===
Pigs are likely to consume citrinin from the feed. It is observed that after administration of 20 and 40 mg citrinin/kg bodyweight, pigs suffer from growth depression, weight loss and glycosuria and decreasing β-globulin after 3 days.

=== Experiments on chickens ===
In broiler chicken, diarrhea, haemorrhages in the intestine and enlargement of livers and kidneys are observed after the administration of 130 and 260 mg citrinin/kg bodyweight for 4–6 weeks.^{2} Different effects occur in mature laying hens which are exposed to 250 mg citrinin/kg bodyweight and 50 mg citrinin/kg bodyweight. This exposure resulted in acute diarrhea and increase of water consumption.
