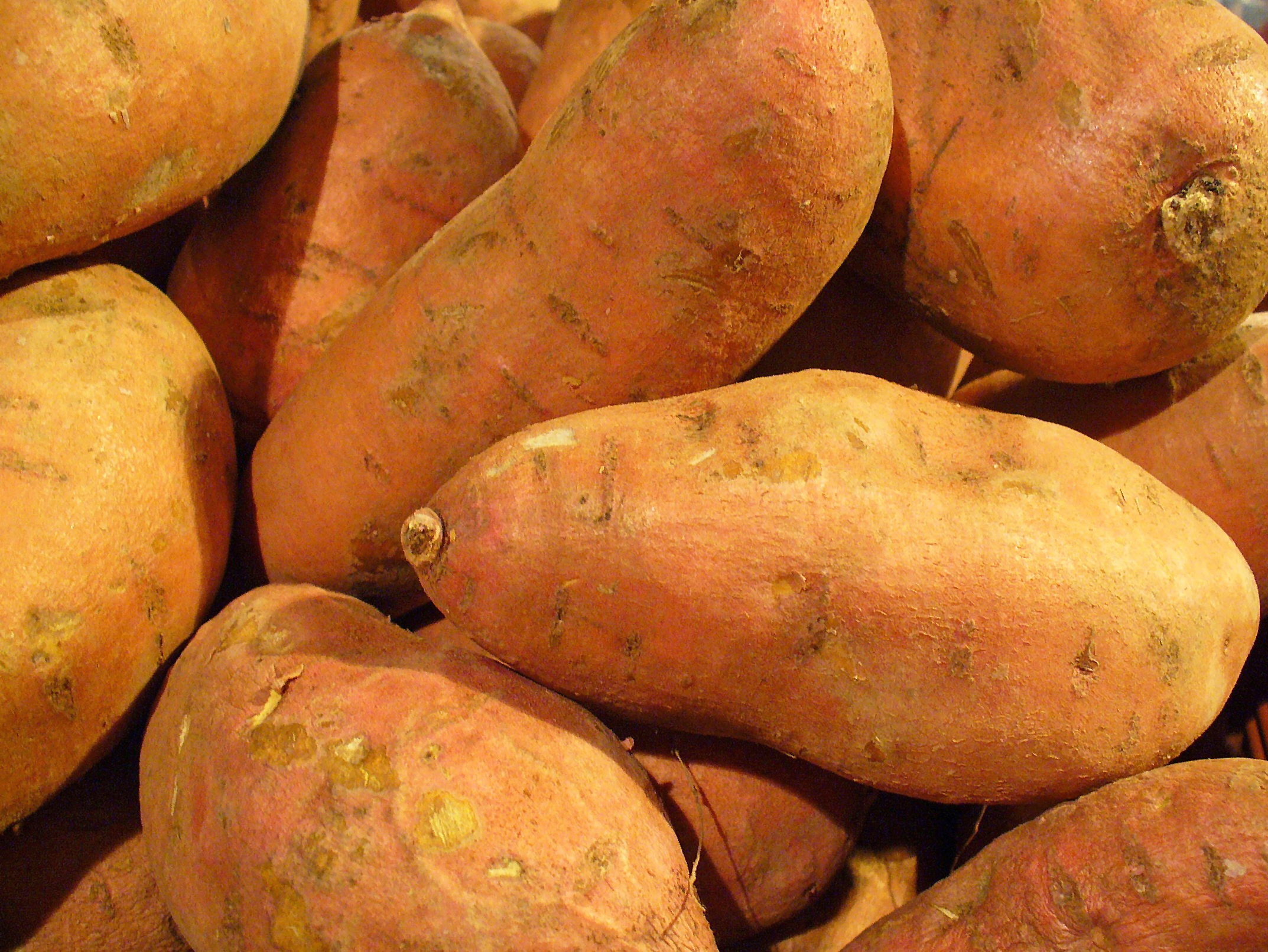
- Sweet potato tubers

Conservation status
- Data Deficient (IUCN 3.1)

- Secure (NatureServe)

Scientific classification
- Kingdom: Plantae
- Clade: Tracheophytes
- Clade: Angiosperms
- Clade: Eudicots
- Clade: Asterids
- Order: Solanales
- Family: Convolvulaceae
- Genus: Ipomoea
- Species: I. batatas

Binomial name
- Ipomoea batatas (L.) Lam.

= Sweet potato =

Species of edible plant

The sweet potato or sweetpotato (Note: This spelling, although less common, has been advocated for because it clarifies the plant's distinctiveness from potatoes and yams.) (Ipomoea batatas) is a dicotyledonous plant in the morning glory family, Convolvulaceae. Its sizeable, starchy, sweet-tasting, tuberous roots are used as a root vegetable, which is a staple food in parts of the world. Cultivars of the sweet potato have been bred to bear tubers with flesh and skin of various colors. Moreover, the young shoots and leaves are eaten as greens with nutritional composition comparable to spinach. The sweet potato and the potato are only distantly related, both being in the order Solanales. Although darker sweet potatoes are often known as yams in parts of North America, they are even more distant from actual yams, which are monocots in the order Dioscoreales.

The sweet potato is native to the warm tropical regions of South America in modern Ecuador. Of the approximately 50 genera and more than 1,000 species of Convolvulaceae, I. batatas is the only crop plant of major importance—some others are used locally (e.g., I. aquatica 'kangkong' as a green vegetable), but many are poisonous. The genus Ipomoea that contains the sweet potato also includes several garden flowers called morning glories, but that term is not usually extended to I. batatas. Some cultivars of I. batatas are grown as ornamental plants under the name tuberous morning glory and sometimes used in a horticultural context.

== Description ==
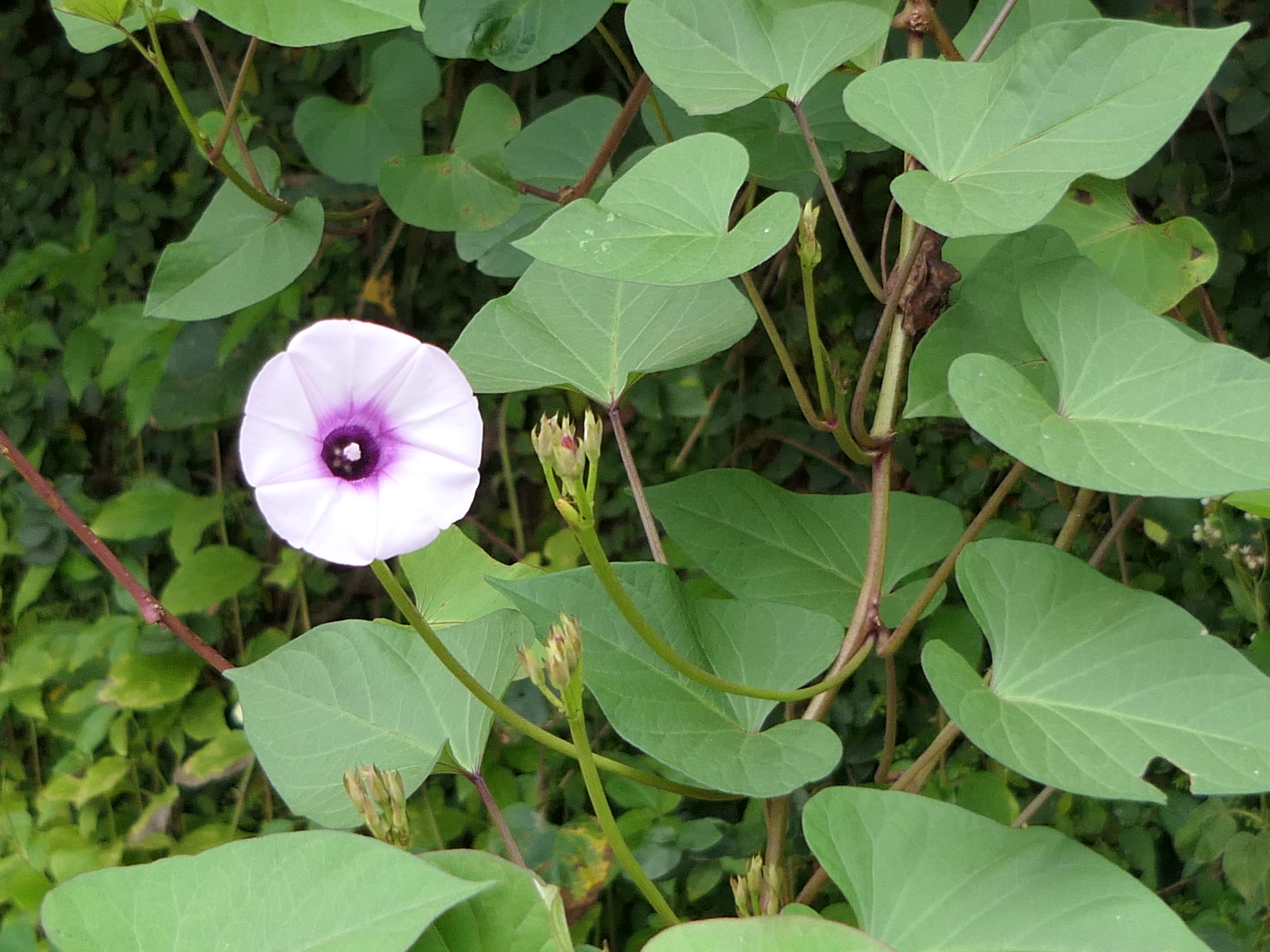
The flowers, buds, and leaves of the sweet potato, which resemble those of the morning glory

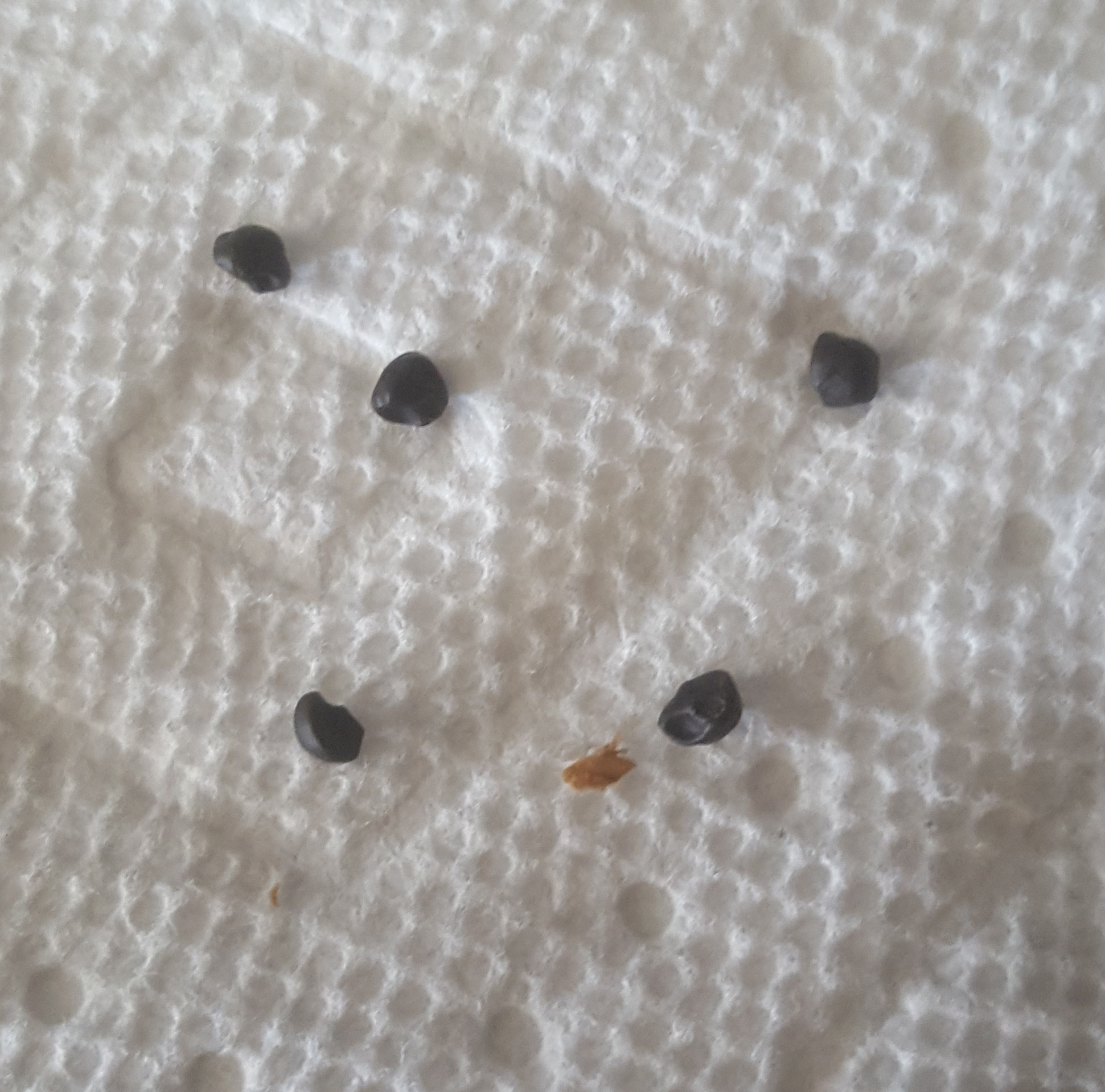
Seeds

The plant is a herbaceous perennial vine, bearing alternate, triangle-shaped or palmately lobed leaves and medium-sized, sympetalous flowers. The stems usually crawl on the ground and form adventitious roots at the nodes. The leaves are screwed along the stems. The leaf stalk is 13 to 51 centimetres (5 to 20 inches) long. The leaf blades are very variable, 5 to 13 cm (2 to 5 in) long, the shape is heart-, kidney-, to egg-shaped, rounded or triangular, and spear-shaped, the edge can be entire, toothed, or often three- to seven-lobed, cut or divided. Most of the leaf surfaces are bare, rarely hairy, and the tip is rounded to pointed. The leaves are mostly green in color, but the accumulation of anthocyanins, especially along the leaf veins, can make them purple. Depending on the variety, the total length of a stem can be between 0.5 and 4 m (1 1/2 and 13 ft). Some cultivars also form shoots up to 16 m (52 ft) in length. However, these do not form underground storage organs.

The hermaphrodite, five-fold, and short-stalked flowers are single or few in stalked, zymous inflorescences that arise from the leaf axils and stand upright. It produces flowers when the day is short. The small sepals are elongated and taper to a point and spiky and (rarely only 7) 10 to 15 millimetres (3/8 to 5/8 in) long, usually finely haired or ciliate. The inner three are a little longer. The 4 to 7 cm (1 1/2 to 2 3/4 in) long, overgrown and funnel-shaped, folded crown, with a shorter hem, can be lavender to purple-lavender in color, the throat is usually darker in color, but white crowns can also appear. The enclosed stamens are of unequal length with glandular filaments. The two-chambered ovary is upper constant with a relatively short stylus. Seeds are only produced from cross-pollination.

The flowers open before sunrise and stay open for a few hours. They close again in the morning and begin to wither. The edible, tuberous root is long and tapered, with a smooth skin whose color ranges between beige, yellow, orange, red, brown, and purple. Its flesh ranges from beige through white, red, pink, violet, yellow, orange, and purple. Sweet potato cultivars with white or pale yellow flesh are less sweet and moist than those with red, pink, or orange flesh.

== Taxonomy ==
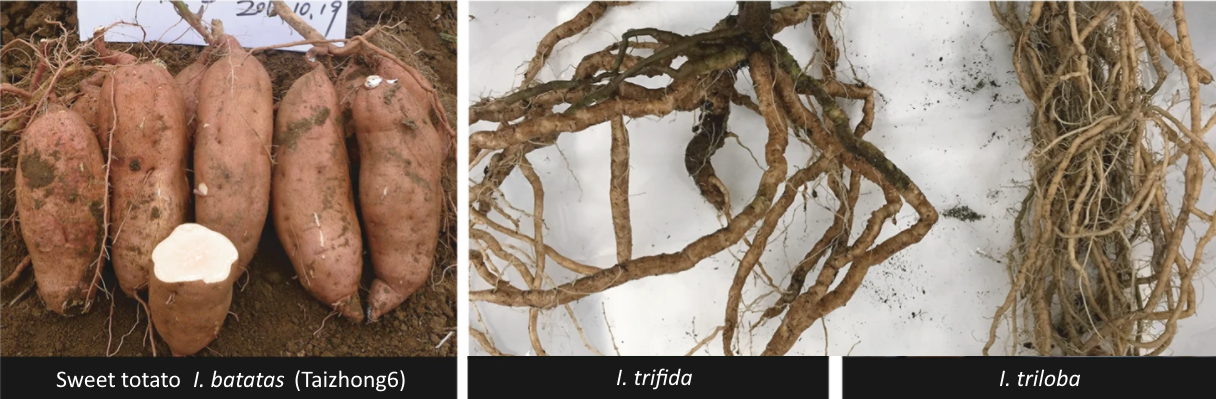
Roots of the 'Taizhong 6' cultivar compared to those of its two closest wild relatives: I. trifida and I. triloba

The sweet potato originated in South America, in what is now Ecuador. The domestication of sweet potato occurred in either Central or South America. In Central America, domesticated sweet potatoes were present at least 5,000 years ago, with the origin of I. batatas possibly between the Yucatán Peninsula of Mexico and the mouth of the Orinoco River in Venezuela. The cultigen was most likely spread by local people to the Caribbean and South America by 2500 BCE.

I. trifida, a diploid, is the closest wild relative of the sweet potato, which originated with an initial cross between a tetraploid and another diploid parent, followed by a second complete genome duplication event. The oldest radiocarbon dating remains of the sweet potato known today were discovered in caves from the Chilca Canyon, in the south-central zone of Peru, and yield an age of 8080 ± 170 BC.

=== Transgenicity ===
The genome of cultivated sweet potatoes contains sequences of DNA from Agrobacterium (sensu lato; specifically, one related to Rhizobium rhizogenes), with genes actively expressed by the plants. The T-DNA transgenes were not observed in closely related wild relatives of the sweet potato. Studies indicated that the sweet potato genome evolved over millennia, with eventual domestication of the crop taking advantage of natural genetic modifications. These observations make sweet potatoes the first known example of a naturally transgenic food crop.

== Cultivation ==
=== Dispersal history ===
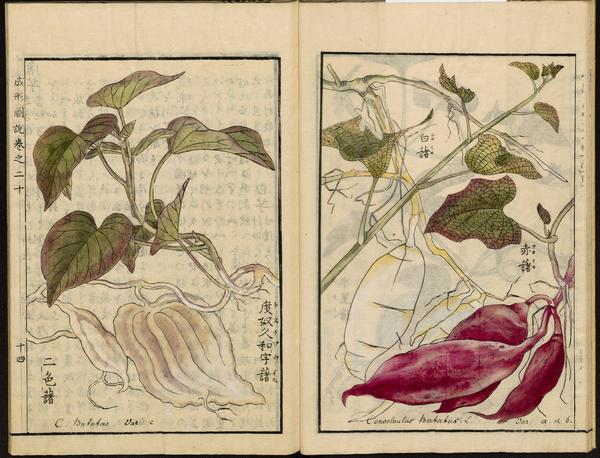
Seikei Zusetsu (~1800)

Before the arrival of Europeans to the Americas, sweet potato was grown in Polynesia, generally spread by vine cuttings rather than by seeds. Sweet potato has been radiocarbon-dated in the Cook Islands to 1210–1400 CE. A common hypothesis is that a vine cutting was brought to central Polynesia by Polynesians who had traveled to South America and back, and spread from there across Polynesia to Easter Island, Hawaii and New Zealand. Genetic similarities have been found between Polynesian peoples and indigenous Americans, including the Zenú, a people inhabiting the Pacific coast of present-day Colombia, indicating that Polynesians may have visited South America and taken sweet potatoes prior to European contact. Dutch linguists and specialists in Amerindian languages Willem Adelaar and Pieter Muysken have suggested that the word for sweet potato is shared by Polynesian languages and languages of South America: Proto-Polynesian *kumala (compare Rapa Nui kumara, Hawaiian ʻuala, Māori kūmara) may be connected with Quechua and Aymara k'umar ~ k'umara. Adelaar and Muysken assert that the similarity in the word for sweet potato is near proof of either incidental or sporadic contact between the Central Andes and Polynesia.

Some researchers, citing divergence time estimates, suggest that sweet potatoes may have been present in Polynesia thousands of years before humans arrived there. However, the present scholarly consensus favours the pre-Columbian contact model.

The sweet potato arrived in Europe with the Columbian exchange. It is recorded, for example, in Elinor Fettiplace's Receipt Book, compiled in England in 1604.

Sweet potatoes were introduced to the Philippines during the Spanish colonial period (1521–1898) via the Manila galleons, along with other New World crops. The plant was introduced to Fujian in about 1594 from Luzon, in response to a major crop failure. Its cultivation was encouraged by the Governor Chin Hsüeh-tseng (Jin Xuezeng).

Sweet potatoes were also introduced to the Ryukyu Kingdom, present-day Okinawa, Japan, in the early 1600s by the Portuguese. Sweet potatoes became a staple in Japan because they were important in preventing famine when rice harvests were poor. Aoki Konyō helped popularize the cultivation of the sweet potato in Japan, and the Tokugawa bakufu sponsored, published, and disseminated a vernacular Japanese translation of his research monograph on sweet potatoes to encourage their growth more broadly. Sweet potatoes were planted in Shōgun Tokugawa Yoshimune's private garden. The crop was introduced to Korea in 1764. Kang P'il-ri and Yi Kwang-ryŏ embarked on a project to grow sweet potatoes in Seoul in 1766, using the knowledge of Japanese cultivators they learned in Tongnae starting in 1764. The project succeeded for a year but ultimately failed in winter 1767 after Kang's unexpected death.

=== Names ===
Although the soft, orange sweet potato is often called a "yam" in parts of North America, the sweet potato is distinct from the botanical yam (Dioscorea), which has a cosmopolitan distribution, and belongs to the monocot family Dioscoreaceae. A different crop plant, the oca (Oxalis tuberosa, a species of wood sorrel), is called a "yam" in many parts of the world.

Although the sweet potato is not closely related botanically to the common potato, they have a shared etymology. The first Europeans to taste sweet potatoes were members of Christopher Columbus's expedition in 1492. Later explorers found many cultivars under an assortment of local names, but the name which stayed was the indigenous Taíno name of batata. The Spanish combined this with the Quechua word for potato, papa, to create the word patata for the common potato.

Though the sweet potato is also called batata (בטטה) in Hebrew, this is not a direct loan of the Taíno word. Rather, the Spanish patata was lent into Arabic as baṭāṭā (بطاطا), owing to the lack of a /p/ sound in Arabic, while the sweet potato was called baṭāṭā ḥilwa (بطاطا حلوة); literally sweet potato. The Arabic baṭāṭā was lent into Hebrew as designating the sweet potato only, as Hebrew had its own word for the common potato, תפוח אדמה (tapuakh adama, literally earth apple; compare French pomme de terre).

Some organizations and researchers advocate for the styling of the name as one word—sweetpotato—instead of two, to emphasize the plant's genetic uniqueness from both common potatoes and yams and to avoid confusion of it being classified as a type of common potato. In its current usage in American English, the styling of the name as two words is still preferred.

When soft varieties were first grown commercially there, a need existed to differentiate between the two. Enslaved Africans had already been calling the soft sweet potatoes as yams because they resembled the unrelated yams in Africa. Thus, soft sweet potatoes were referred to as yams to distinguish them from the firm varieties.

In Argentina, Colombia, Venezuela, Puerto Rico, and the Dominican Republic, the sweet potato is called batata. In Brazil, the sweet potato is called batata doce. In Mexico, Bolivia, Peru, Chile, Central America, and the Philippines, the sweet potato is known as camote (alternatively spelled kamote in the Philippines), derived from the Nahuatl word camotli. In Peru and Bolivia, the general word in Quechua for the sweet potato is apichu, but other variants are used, such as khumara, kumar (Ayacucho Quechua), and kumara (Bolivian Quechua), strikingly similar to the Polynesian name kumara and its regional Oceanic cognates (kumala, umala, ʻuala, etc.), which has led some scholars to suspect an instance of pre-Columbian transoceanic contact. This theory is also supported by genetic evidence.

In Australia, about 90% of production is devoted to the orange cultivar 'Beauregard', which was originally developed by the Louisiana Agricultural Experiment Station in 1981.

In New Zealand, the Māori varieties bore elongated tubers with white skin and a whitish flesh, which points to pre-European cross-Pacific travel. Known as kumara (from the Māori language kūmara), the most common cultivar now is the red 'Owairaka', but orange ('Beauregard'), gold, purple, and other cultivars are also grown.

=== Habitat ===
The plant does not tolerate frost. It grows best at an average temperature of 24 °C (75 °F), with abundant sunshine and warm nights. Annual rainfalls of 750–1,000 mm (30–39 in) are considered most suitable, with a minimum of 500 mm (20 in) in the growing season. The crop is sensitive to drought at the tuber initiation stage 50–60 days after planting, and it is not tolerant to waterlogging, which may cause tuber rots and reduce the growth of storage roots if aeration is poor.

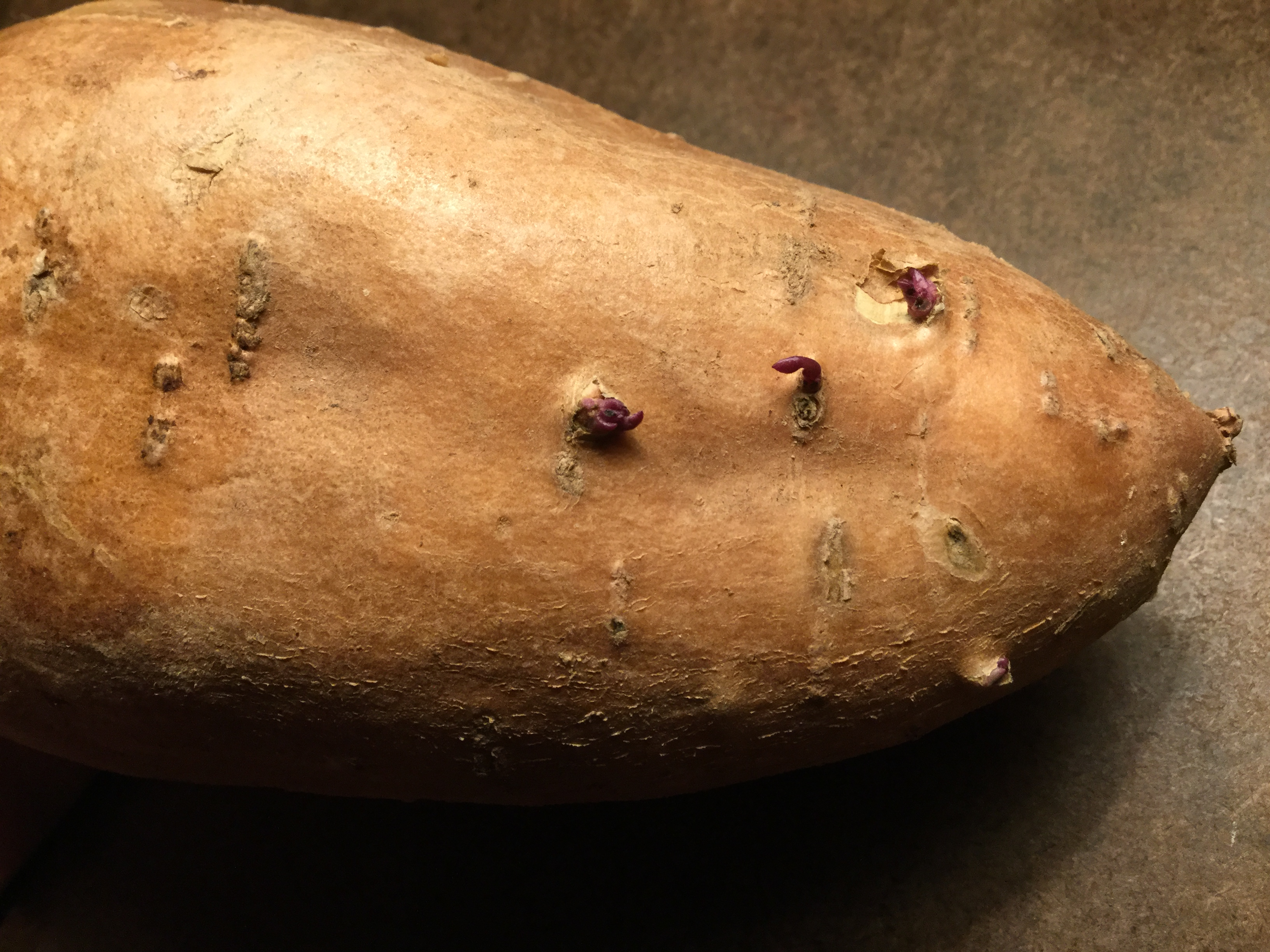
Sweet potato sprouting "slips"

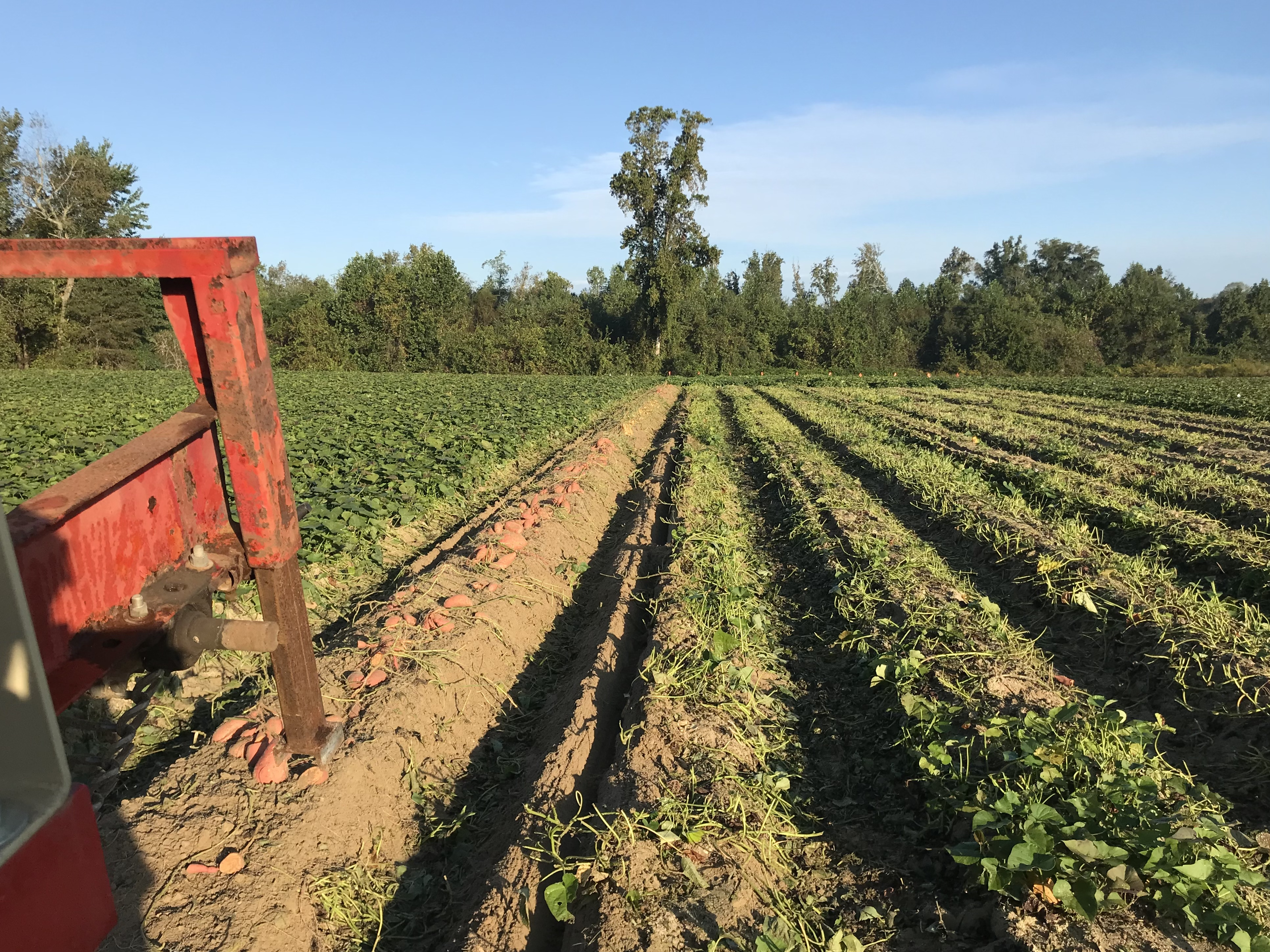
Sweet potato harvest in Nash County, North Carolina, United States

Depending on the cultivar and conditions, tuberous roots mature in 2-9 months. With care, early-maturing cultivars can be grown as an annual summer crop in warm temperate areas, such as the Eastern United States and China. Sweet potatoes rarely flower when the daylight is longer than 11 hours, as is normal outside of the tropics. They are mostly propagated by stem or root cuttings or by adventitious shoots called "slips" that grow out from the tuberous roots during storage. True seeds are used for breeding only.

They grow well in many farming conditions and have few natural enemies; pesticides are rarely needed. Sweet potatoes are grown on a variety of soils, but well-drained, light- and medium-textured soils with a pH range of 4.5–7.0 are more favorable for the plant. They can be grown in poor soils with little fertilizer. However, sweet potatoes are very sensitive to aluminum toxicity and will die about six weeks after planting if lime is not applied at planting in this type of soil. As they are sown by vine cuttings rather than seeds, sweet potatoes are relatively easy to plant. As the rapidly growing vines shade out weeds, little weeding is needed. A commonly used herbicide to rid the soil of any unwelcome plants that may interfere with growth is dimethyl tetrachloroterephthalate, known as trade name Dacthal. In the tropics, the crop can be maintained in the ground and harvested as needed for market or home consumption. In temperate regions, sweet potatoes are most often grown on larger farms and are harvested before first frosts.

Sweet potatoes are cultivated throughout tropical and warm temperate regions wherever water is sufficient to support their growth. Sweet potatoes became common as a food crop in the islands of the Pacific Ocean, South India, Uganda and other African countries.

A cultivar of the sweet potato called the boniato is grown in the Caribbean; its flesh is cream-colored, unlike the more common orange hue seen in other cultivars. The boniato is not as sweet and moist as other sweet potatoes, but its consistency and delicate flavor are different from the common, orange-colored sweet potato.

Sweet potatoes have been a part of the diet in the U.S. for most of its history, especially in the Southeast. The annual per capita consumption of sweet potatoes in the U.S. is only about 1.5–2.0 kg (3 1/2–4 1/2 lb), down from 13 kg (29 lb) in 1920. "Orange sweet potatoes (the most common type encountered in the U.S.) received higher appearance liking scores compared with yellow or purple cultivars." Purple and yellow sweet potatoes were not as well liked by consumers compared to orange sweet potatoes "possibly because of the familiarity of orange color that is associated with sweet potatoes."

In the Southeastern U.S., sweet potatoes are traditionally cured to improve storage, flavor, and nutrition, and to allow wounds on the periderm of the harvested root to heal. Proper curing requires drying the freshly dug roots on the ground for two to three hours, then storage at 29–32 °C (85–90 °F) with 90 to 95% relative humidity from 5-14 days. Cured sweet potatoes can keep for 13 months when stored at 13–15 °C (55–59 °F) with greater than 90% relative humidity. Colder temperatures injure the roots.

=== Production ===
Sweet potato production – 2020 (millions of tonnes)
China	48.9
Malawi	6.9
Tanzania	4.4
Angola	1.7
Ethiopia	1.6
World	89.5
Source: FAOSTAT of the United Nations

In 2020, global production of sweet potatoes was 89 million tonnes, led by China with 55% of the world total (table). Secondary producers were Malawi, Tanzania, and Nigeria. It is the fifth-most-important food crop in developing countries. Studies are being done to develop a salt tolerant variety to combat the effects of climate change.

In Japan, sweet potato production increased strongly during the food shortages after the Second World War, reaching a peak of about 7 million tonnes in 1955, and has since declined to around 1 million tonnes per year (about 942,000 tonnes from 38,000 hectares in 2013). The main production areas are southern Kyushu (Kagoshima, Miyazaki and Kumamoto prefectures) and the Kantō region (Ibaraki and Chiba prefectures). About 45% of the Japanese harvest is eaten as a table vegetable and around 10% is used for processed foods; the rest is used mainly for starch and for shōchū. Since 2005 more sweet potatoes have been used for shōchū than for starch, as domestic starch has lost ground to imported maize and cassava starch. Breeding is carried out mainly by the National Agriculture and Food Research Organization (NARO), and developing a new cultivar takes more than eight years after crossing.

Sweet potato production

Sweet potato yield

=== Diseases ===
Sweet potato suffers from the Sweet Potato Chlorotic Stunt Virus SPCSV (Crinivirus ipomeae). A synergistic co-infection with Carla-, Cucumo-, Ipomo-, and Potyviruses has been described.

Oomycetes of the genus Phytophthora can also cause disease, including P. carotovorum, P. odoriferum, and P. wasabiae.

In Japan, soil-borne diseases, viruses, the southern root-knot nematode and weevils cause significant damage to the crop. Shipping sweet potatoes from the weevil-infested southwestern islands, including Okinawa Prefecture, to the rest of the country is prohibited under the Plant Protection Law.

== Uses ==
=== Nutrition ===
Sweet potato, cooked, baked in skin, without salt
Nutritional value per 100 g (3.5 oz)
- Energy: 378 kJ (90 kcal)
- Carbohydrates: 20.7 g
- Starch: 7.05 g
- Sugars: 6.5 g
- Dietary fiber: 3.3 g
- Fat: 0.15 g
- Protein: 2.0 g
Vitamins and minerals
Vitamins	Quantity %DV^{†}
Vitamin A equiv. beta-Carotene	107% 961 μg 107% 11509 μg
Thiamine (B1)	9% 0.11 mg
Riboflavin (B2)	8% 0.11 mg
Niacin (B3)	9% 1.5 mg
Vitamin B6	17% 0.29 mg
Folate (B9)	2% 6 μg
Vitamin C	22% 19.6 mg
Vitamin E	5% 0.71 mg
Minerals	Quantity %DV^{†}
Calcium	3% 38 mg
Iron	4% 0.69 mg
Magnesium	6% 27 mg
Manganese	22% 0.5 mg
Phosphorus	4% 54 mg
Potassium	16% 475 mg
Sodium	2% 36 mg
Zinc	3% 0.32 mg
- Other constituents: Quantity
- Water: 75.8 g
- "Sweet potato". USDA Database. Archived from the original on 3 April 2019.
- ^{†}Percentages estimated using US recommendations for adults, except for potassium, which is estimated based on expert recommendation from the National Academies.

Raw sweet potato
Nutritional value per 100 g (3.5 oz)
- Energy: 359 kJ (86 kcal)
- Carbohydrates: 20.1 g
- Starch: 12.7 g
- Sugars: 4.2 g
- Dietary fiber: 3 g
- Fat: 0.1 g
- Protein: 1.6 g
Vitamins and minerals
Vitamins	Quantity %DV^{†}
Vitamin A equiv. beta-Carotene	79% 709 μg 79% 8509 μg
Thiamine (B1)	7% 0.078 mg
Riboflavin (B2)	5% 0.061 mg
Niacin (B3)	3% 0.557 mg
Pantothenic acid (B5)	16% 0.8 mg
Vitamin B6	12% 0.209 mg
Folate (B9)	3% 11 μg
Vitamin C	3% 2.4 mg
Vitamin E	2% 0.26 mg
Minerals	Quantity %DV^{†}
Calcium	2% 30 mg
Iron	3% 0.61 mg
Magnesium	6% 25 mg
Manganese	11% 0.258 mg
Phosphorus	4% 47 mg
Potassium	11% 337 mg
Sodium	2% 55 mg
Zinc	3% 0.3 mg
- Other constituents: Quantity
- Water: 77.3 g
- "Sweet potato, raw". USDA Database. Archived from the original on 3 April 2019.
- ^{†}Percentages estimated using US recommendations for adults, except for potassium, which is estimated based on expert recommendation from the National Academies.

Cooked sweet potato (baked in skin) is 76% water, 21% carbohydrates, and 2% protein, with negligible fat (table). In a 100-gram reference amount, baked sweet potato provides 359 kilojoules (86 kilocalories) of food energy, and rich content (20% or more of the Daily Value, DV) of vitamin A (120% DV), vitamin C (24% DV), manganese (24% DV), and vitamin B_{6} (20% DV). It is a moderate source (10–19% DV) of some B vitamins and potassium. Between 50 and 90% of the sugar content is sucrose. Maltose content is very low, but baking can increase it from 10 to 20%.

Sweet potato cultivars with dark orange flesh have greater beta-carotene, which is converted to greater vitamin A content once digested, compared to those with light-colored flesh, and their increased cultivation is being encouraged in Africa, where vitamin A deficiency is a serious health problem.

==== Leaves ====
Sweet potato leaves have historically been used as a food source. The nutritional composition has been analyzed to contain around 2.61–4.85% crude protein (comparable to kale and spinach), high amounts of β-carotene and Vitamin C, and antioxidant polyphenols. The content of polyphenols is affected by various conditions from genotype, harvest period and environmental conditions. Micronutrients include Vitamin E (tocopherols and tocotrienols), Vitamin B2 (riboflavin), and main trace minerals are Na, Se, Mg and Zn. Purple leaf varieties and high-K/low-Na cultivars such as "Guangcaishu" are nutritionally preferable. Bioavailability of minerals and calcium uptake is hindered by high oxalate content of 530.20 mg/100 g fresh weight, which is half that of spinach.

According to South Pacific Commission Community Health Services South Pacific Foods leaflet No. 13, sweet potato leaves and shoots are a good source of vitamins A, C, and B_{2} (riboflavin), and according to research done by A. Khachatryan, are an excellent source of lutein.

=== Comparison to other food staples ===
The table below presents the relative performance of sweet potato (in column)^{[G]} to other staple foods on a dry weight basis to account for their different water contents. While sweet potato provides less edible energy and protein per unit weight than cereals, it has higher nutrient density than cereals.

According to a study by the United Nations Food and Agriculture Organization, sweet potatoes are the most efficient staple food to grow in terms of farmland, yielding roughly 290,000 kilojoules per hectare (28,000 kcal/acre) daily.

Nutrient content of 10 major staple foods per 100 g dry mass
Staple	Maize (corn)^{[A]}	Rice, white^{[B]}	Wheat^{[C]}	Potatoes^{[D]}	Cassava^{[E]}	Soybeans, green^{[F]}	Sweet potatoes^{[G]}	Yams^{[Y]}	Sorghum^{[H]}	Plantain^{[Z]}	RDA
Water content (%)	10	12	13	79	60	68	77	70	9	65	
Raw grams per 100 g dry mass	111	114	115	476	250	313	435	333	110	286	
Nutrient											
Energy (kJ)	1698	1736	1574	1533	1675	1922	1565	1647	1559	1460	8,368–10,460
Protein (g)	10.4	8.1	14.5	9.5	3.5	40.6	7.0	5.0	12.4	3.7	50
Fat (g)	5.3	0.8	1.8	0.4	0.7	21.6	0.2	0.6	3.6	1.1	44–77
Carbohydrates (g)	82	91	82	81	95	34	87	93	82	91	130
Fiber (g)	8.1	1.5	14.0	10.5	4.5	13.1	13.0	13.7	6.9	6.6	30
Sugar (g)	0.7	0.1	0.5	3.7	4.3	0.0	18.2	1.7	0.0	42.9	minimal
Minerals	^{[A]}	^{[B]}	^{[C]}	^{[D]}	^{[E]}	^{[F]}	^{[G]}	^{[Y]}	^{[H]}	^{[Z]}	RDA
Calcium (mg)	8	32	33	57	40	616	130	57	31	9	1,000
Iron (mg)	3.01	0.91	3.67	3.71	0.68	11.09	2.65	1.80	4.84	1.71	8
Magnesium (mg)	141	28	145	110	53	203	109	70	0	106	400
Phosphorus (mg)	233	131	331	271	68	606	204	183	315	97	700
Potassium (mg)	319	131	417	2005	678	1938	1465	2720	385	1426	4700
Sodium (mg)	39	6	2	29	35	47	239	30	7	11	1,500
Zinc (mg)	2.46	1.24	3.05	1.38	0.85	3.09	1.30	0.80	0.00	0.40	11
Copper (mg)	0.34	0.25	0.49	0.52	0.25	0.41	0.65	0.60	-	0.23	0.9
Manganese (mg)	0.54	1.24	4.59	0.71	0.95	1.72	1.13	1.33	-	-	2.3
Selenium (μg)	17.2	17.2	81.3	1.4	1.8	4.7	2.6	2.3	0.0	4.3	55
Vitamins	^{[A]}	^{[B]}	^{[C]}	^{[D]}	^{[E]}	^{[F]}	^{[G]}	^{[Y]}	^{[H]}	^{[Z]}	RDA
Vitamin C (mg)	0.0	0.0	0.0	93.8	51.5	90.6	10.4	57.0	0.0	52.6	90
Thiamin (B1) (mg)	0.43	0.08	0.34	0.38	0.23	1.38	0.35	0.37	0.26	0.14	1.2
Riboflavin (B2) (mg)	0.22	0.06	0.14	0.14	0.13	0.56	0.26	0.10	0.15	0.14	1.3
Niacin (B3) (mg)	4.03	1.82	6.28	5.00	2.13	5.16	2.43	1.83	3.22	1.97	16
Pantothenic acid (B5) (mg)	0.47	1.15	1.09	1.43	0.28	0.47	3.48	1.03	-	0.74	5
Vitamin B6 (mg)	0.69	0.18	0.34	1.43	0.23	0.22	0.91	0.97	-	0.86	1.3
Folate Total (B9) (μg)	21	9	44	76	68	516	48	77	0	63	400
Vitamin A (IU)	238	0	10	10	33	563	4178	460	0	3220	5000
Vitamin E, α-tocopherol (mg)	0.54	0.13	1.16	0.05	0.48	0.00	1.13	1.30	0.00	0.40	15
Vitamin K1 (μg)	0.3	0.1	2.2	9.0	4.8	0.0	7.8	8.7	0.0	2.0	120
Beta-carotene (μg)	108	0	6	5	20	0	36996	277	0	1306	10500
Lutein+zeaxanthin (μg)	1506	0	253	38	0	0	0	0	0	86	6000
Fats	^{[A]}	^{[B]}	^{[C]}	^{[D]}	^{[E]}	^{[F]}	^{[G]}	^{[Y]}	^{[H]}	^{[Z]}	RDA
Saturated (g)	0.74	0.20	0.30	0.14	0.18	2.47	0.09	0.13	0.51	0.40	minimal
Monounsaturated (g)	1.39	0.24	0.23	0.00	0.20	4.00	0.00	0.03	1.09	0.09	22–55
Polyunsaturated (g)	2.40	0.20	0.72	0.19	0.13	10.00	0.04	0.27	1.51	0.20	13–19
	^{[A]}	^{[B]}	^{[C]}	^{[D]}	^{[E]}	^{[F]}	^{[G]}	^{[Y]}	^{[H]}	^{[Z]}	RDA

^{A} raw yellow dent corn
^{B} raw unenriched long-grain white rice
^{C} raw hard red winter wheat
^{D} raw potato with flesh and skin
^{E} raw cassava
^{F} raw green soybeans
^{G} raw sweet potato
^{H} raw sorghum
^{Y} raw yam
^{Z} raw plantains
^{/*} unofficial

=== Food ===
Yearly per capita supply of sweet potatoes

The starchy, tuberous roots of the sweet potato are by far the most important product of the plant. In some tropical areas, the tubers are a staple food crop and are often cooked before consumption, as this increases nutritive value and digestibility, although the American colonists in the Southeast ate raw sweet potatoes as a staple food.

The vines' tips and young leaves are edible as a green vegetable with a characteristic flavor. Older growths may be used as animal fodder.

==== Africa ====
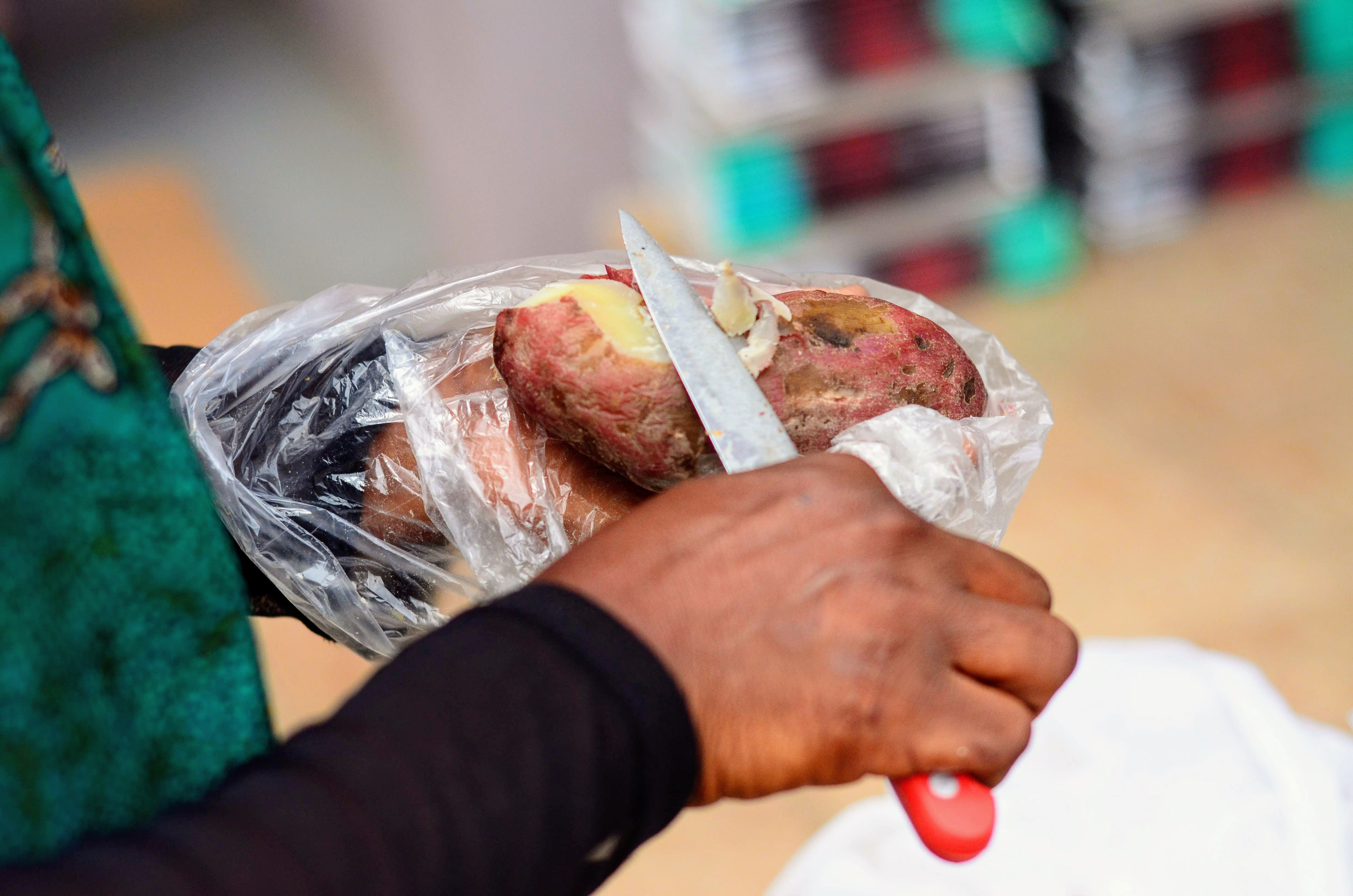
A seller peeling a sweet potato in Ghana

Amukeke (sun-dried slices of root) and inginyo (sun-dried crushed root) are a staple food for people in northeastern Uganda. Amukeke is mainly served for breakfast, eaten with peanut sauce. Inginyo is mixed with cassava flour and tamarind to make atapa. People eat atapa with smoked fish cooked in peanut sauce or with dried cowpea leaves cooked in peanut sauce. Emukaru (earth-baked root) is eaten as a snack anytime and is mostly served with tea or with peanut sauce. Similar uses are also found in South Sudan.

The young leaves and vine tips of sweet potato leaves are widely consumed as a vegetable in West African countries (Guinea, Sierra Leone and Liberia, for example), as well as in northeastern Uganda, East Africa.

In Kenya, Rhoda Nungo of the home economics department of the Ministry of Agriculture has written a guide to using sweet potatoes in modern recipes. This includes uses both in the mashed form and as flour from the dried tubers to replace part of the wheat flour and sugar in baked products such as cakes, chapatis, mandazis, bread, buns, and cookies. A nutritious juice drink is made from the orange-fleshed cultivars, and deep-fried snacks are also included.

In Egypt, sweet potato tubers are known as baṭāṭā (بطاطا) and are a common street food in winter, when street vendors with carts fitted with ovens sell them to people passing time by the Nile or the sea. The cultivars used are an orange-fleshed one as well as a white/cream-fleshed one. They are also baked at home as a snack or dessert, drenched with honey.

In Ethiopia, the commonly found cultivars are black-skinned, cream-fleshed, and called bitatis or mitatis. They are cultivated in the eastern and southern lower highlands and harvested during the rainy season (June/July). Some better-yielding, orange-fleshed cultivars were released for cultivation by Haramaya University as a less sugary sweet potato with higher vitamin A content. Sweet potatoes are widely eaten boiled as a favored snack.

In South Africa, sweet potatoes are often eaten as a side dish such as soetpatats.

==== Asia ====
In East Asia, roasted sweet potatoes are popular street food. In China, sweet potatoes, typically yellow cultivars, are baked in a large iron drum and sold as street food during winter. In Korea, sweet potatoes, known as goguma, are roasted in a drum can, baked in foil or on an open fire, typically during winter. In Japan, a dish similar to the Korean preparation is called yaki-imo (roasted sweet potato), which typically uses either the yellow-fleshed "Japanese sweet potato" or the purple-fleshed "Okinawan sweet potato", which is known as beni-imo.

Sweet potato soup, served during winter, consists of sweet potato boiled in water with rock sugar and ginger. In Fujian cuisine and Taiwanese cuisine, sweet potato is often cooked with rice to make congee. Steamed and dried sweet potato is a specialty of Liancheng County. Sweet potato greens are a common side dish in Taiwanese cuisine, often boiled or sautéed and served with a garlic and soy sauce mixture, or simply salted before serving. They, as well as dishes featuring the sweet potato root, are commonly found at bento (Pe̍h-ōe-jī: piān-tong) restaurants. In northeastern Chinese cuisine, sweet potatoes are often cut into chunks and fried, before being drenched into a pan of boiling syrup.

In some regions of India, sweet potato is roasted slowly over kitchen coals at night and eaten with some dressing, while the easier way in the south is simply boiling or pressure cooking before peeling, cubing and seasoning for a vegetable dish as part of the meal. In the Indian state of Tamil Nadu, it is known as sakkara valli kilangu. It is boiled and consumed as an evening snack. In some parts of India, fresh sweet potato is chipped, dried and then ground into flour; this is then mixed with wheat flour and baked into chapatti (bread). Between 15 and 20 percent of the sweet potato harvest is converted by some Indian communities into pickles and snack chips. A part of the tuber harvest is used in India as cattle fodder.

In Pakistan and northwestern India, sweet potato is known as shakarqandi and is cooked as a vegetable dish and also with meat dishes (chicken, mutton or beef). The ash-roasted sweet potatoes are sold as a snack and street food in bazaars especially during the winter months.

In Sri Lanka, it is called bathala, and tubers are used mainly for breakfast (boiled sweet potato is commonly served with sambal or grated coconut) or as a supplementary curry dish for rice.

The tubers of this plant, known as kattala in Dhivehi, have been used in the traditional diet of the Maldives. The leaves were finely chopped and used in dishes such as mas huni.

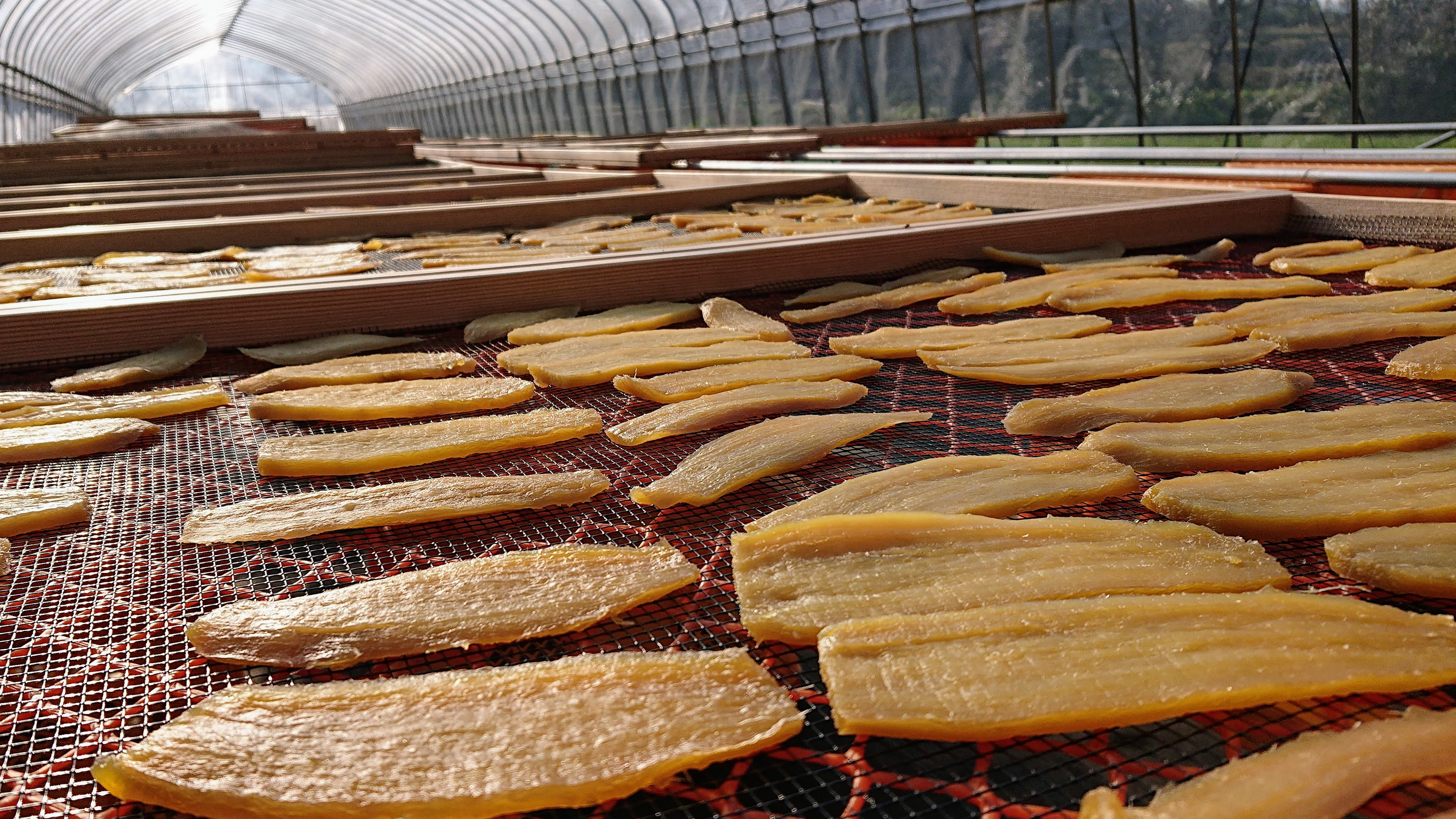
Hoshi-imo, or Japanese dried sweet potatoes, a specialty of Ibaraki Prefecture, drying in Ōarai City

In Japan, both sweet potatoes (called satsuma-imo) and true purple yams (called daijo) are grown. Boiling, roasting and steaming are the most common cooking methods. Also, the use in vegetable tempura is common. Daigaku-imo (ja:大学芋) is a baked and caramel-syruped sweet potato dessert. As it is sweet and starchy, it is used in imo-kinton and some other traditional sweets, such as ofukuimo. What is commonly called "sweet potato" (ja:スイートポテト) in Japan is a cake made by baking mashed sweet potatoes. Shōchū, a Japanese spirit normally made from the fermentation of rice, can also be made from sweet potato, in which case it is called imo-jōchū. Imo-gohan, sweet potato cooked with rice, is popular in Guangdong, Taiwan and Japan. It is also served in nimono or nitsuke, boiled and typically flavored with soy sauce, mirin and dashi. In the 20th century, the sweet potato was the predominant source of energy in the traditional Okinawan diet.

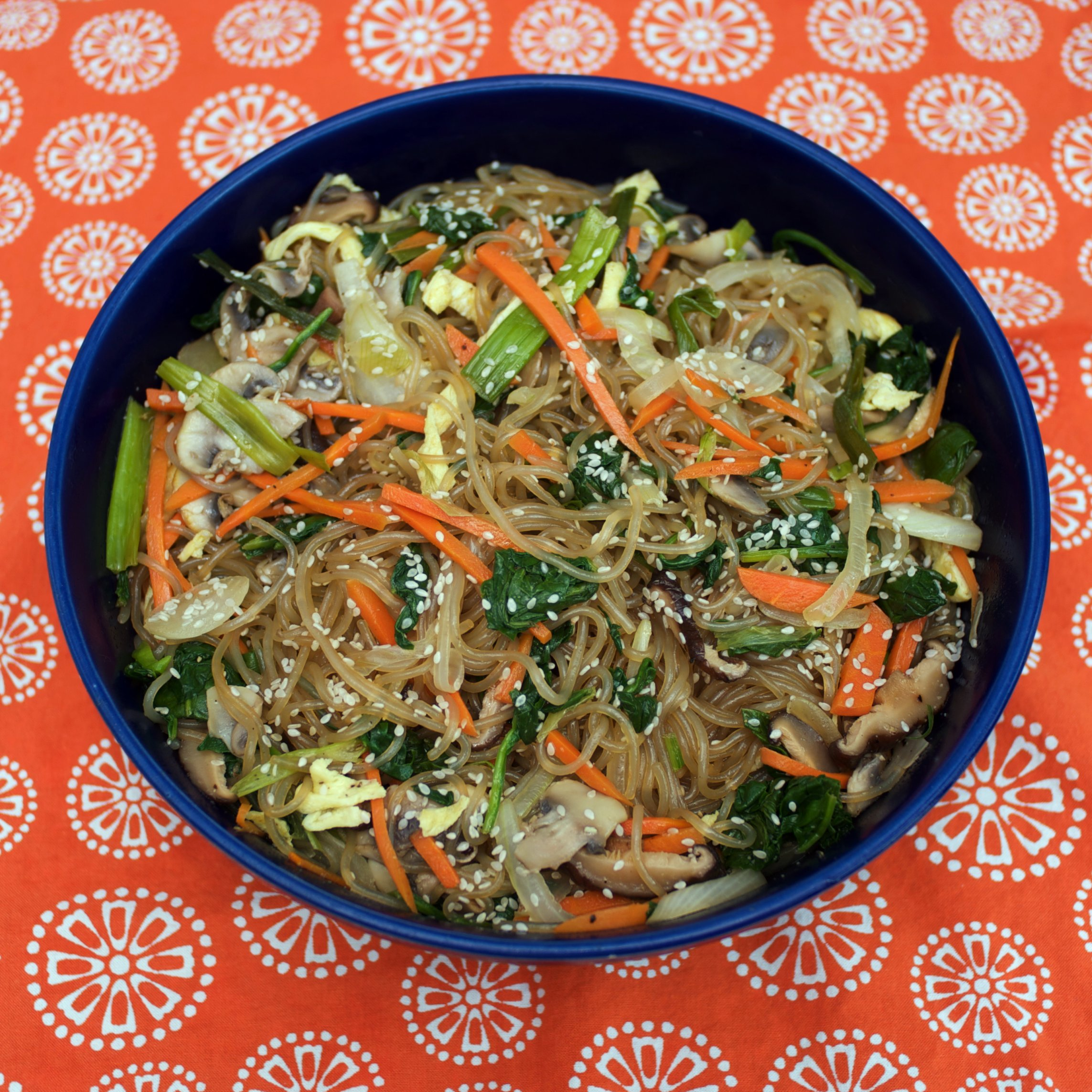
Korean japchae, or stir-fried cellophane noodles made of sweet potato starch

In Korean cuisine, sweet potato starch is used to produce dangmyeon (cellophane noodles). Sweet potatoes are also boiled, steamed, or roasted, and young stems are eaten as namul. Pizza restaurants such as Pizza Hut and Domino's in Korea are using sweet potatoes as a popular topping. Sweet potatoes are also used in the distillation of a variety of Soju. A popular Korean side dish or snack, goguma-mattang, also known as Korean candied sweet potato, is made by deep-frying sweet potatoes that were cut into big chunks and coating them with caramelized sugar.

In Malaysia and Singapore, sweet potato is often cut into small cubes and cooked with taro and coconut milk (santan) to make a sweet dessert called bubur cha cha. A favorite way of cooking sweet potato is deep-frying slices of sweet potato in batter, served as a tea-time snack. In homes, sweet potatoes are usually boiled. The leaves of sweet potatoes are usually stir-fried with only garlic or with sambal belacan and dried shrimp by Malaysians.

In the Philippines, sweet potatoes (locally known as camote or kamote) are an important food crop in rural areas. They are often a staple among impoverished families in provinces, as they are easier to cultivate and cost less than rice. The tubers are boiled or baked in coals and may be dipped in sugar or syrup. Young leaves and shoots (locally known as talbos ng kamote or camote tops) are eaten fresh in salads with shrimp paste (bagoong alamang) or fish sauce. They can be cooked in vinegar and soy sauce and served with fried fish (a dish known as adobong talbos ng kamote), or with recipes such as sinigang. The stew obtained from boiling camote tops is purple-colored, and is often mixed with lemon as juice. Sweet potatoes are also sold as street food in suburban and rural areas. Fried sweet potatoes coated with caramelized sugar and served in skewers (camote cue) or as French fries are popular afternoon snacks. Sweet potatoes are also used in a variant of halo-halo called ginatan, where they are cooked in coconut milk and sugar and mixed with a variety of rootcrops, sago, jackfruit, and bilu-bilo (glutinous rice balls). Bread made from sweet potato flour is also gaining popularity. Sweet potato is relatively easy to propagate, and in rural areas can be seen abundantly at canals and dikes. The uncultivated plant is usually fed to pigs.

In Indonesia, sweet potatoes are locally known as ubi jalar (lit: "spreading tuber") or simply ubi and are frequently fried with batter and served as snacks with spicy condiments, along with other kinds of fritters such as fried bananas, tempeh, tahu, breadfruit, or cassava. In the mountainous regions of West Papua, sweet potatoes are the staple food among the natives there. Using the bakar batu method of cooking, rocks that have been burned in a nearby bonfire are thrown into a pit lined with leaves. Layers of sweet potatoes, an assortment of vegetables, and pork are piled on top of the rocks. The top of the pile is then insulated with more leaves, creating a pressure of heat and steam inside which cooks all food within the pile after several hours.

In Vietnamese cuisine sweet potatoes are known as khoai lang and they are commonly cooked with a sweetener such as corn syrup, honey, sugar, or molasses.

Young sweet potato leaves are also used as baby food, particularly in Southeast Asia and East Asia. Mashed sweet potato tubers are used similarly throughout the world.

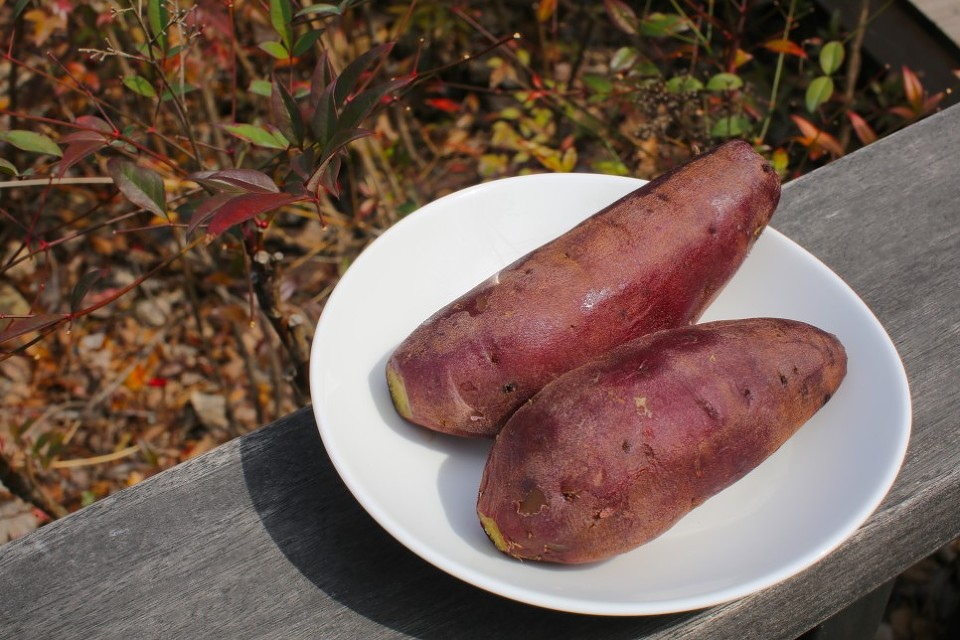
Jjin-goguma (steamed sweet potatoes)

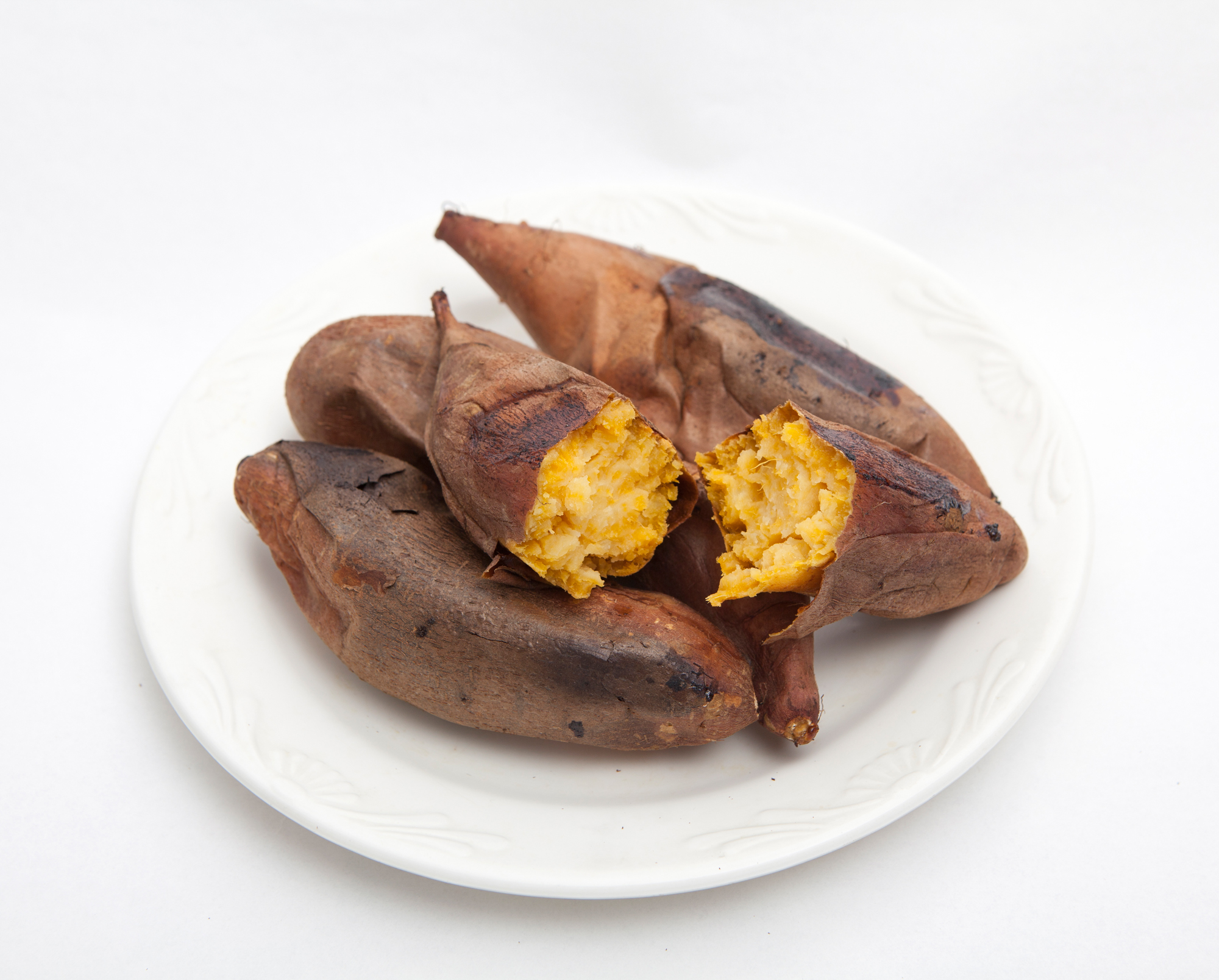
Gungoguma, roasted sweet potatoes

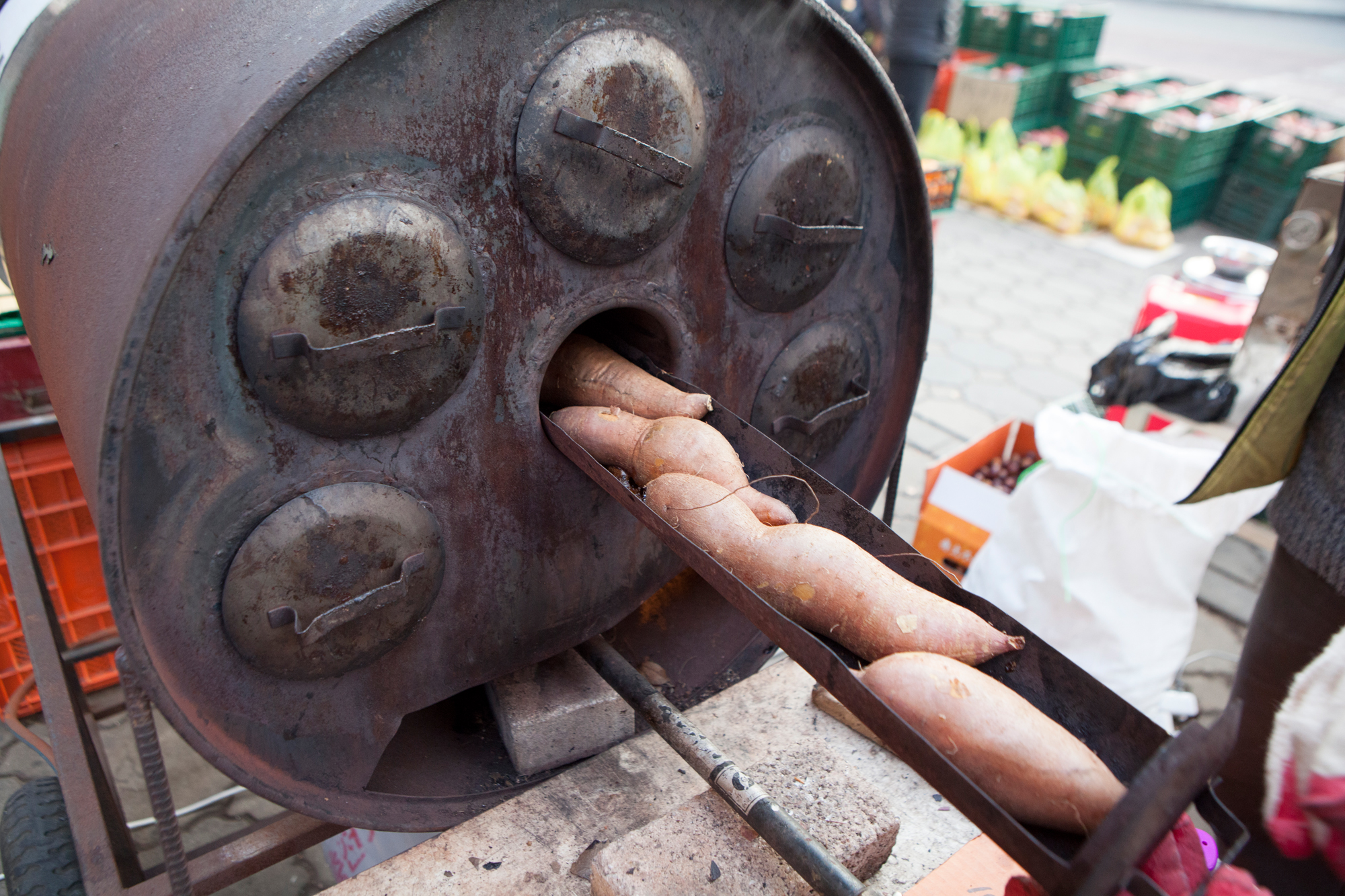
"Gungoguma drum" for roasting sweet potatoes

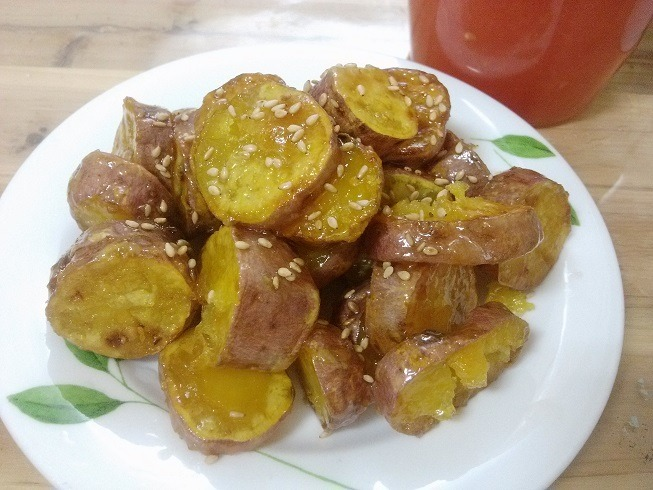
Goguma-mattang (candied sweet potatoes)

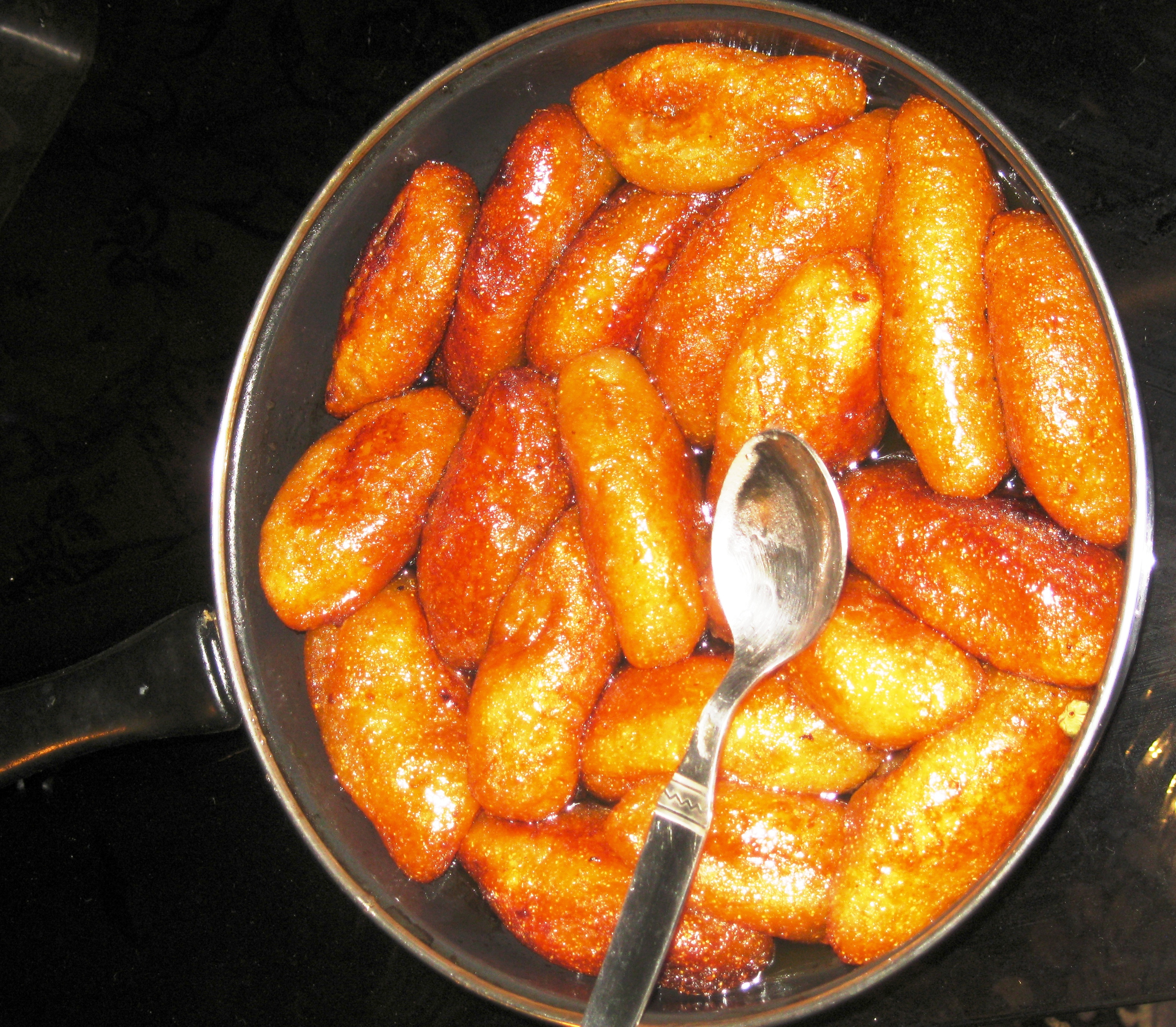
Fried, sweetened sweet potato, India

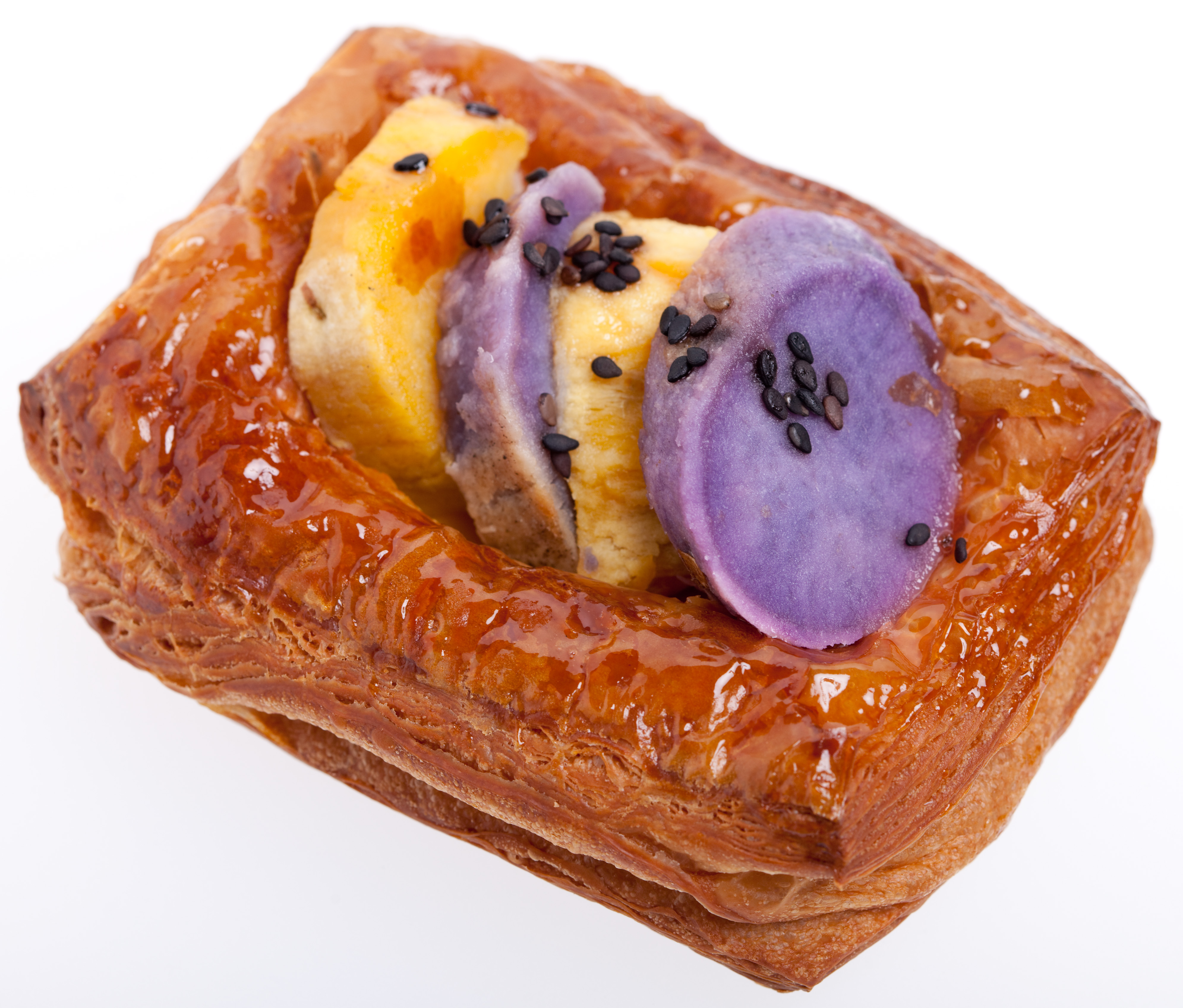
Taiwanese pastry

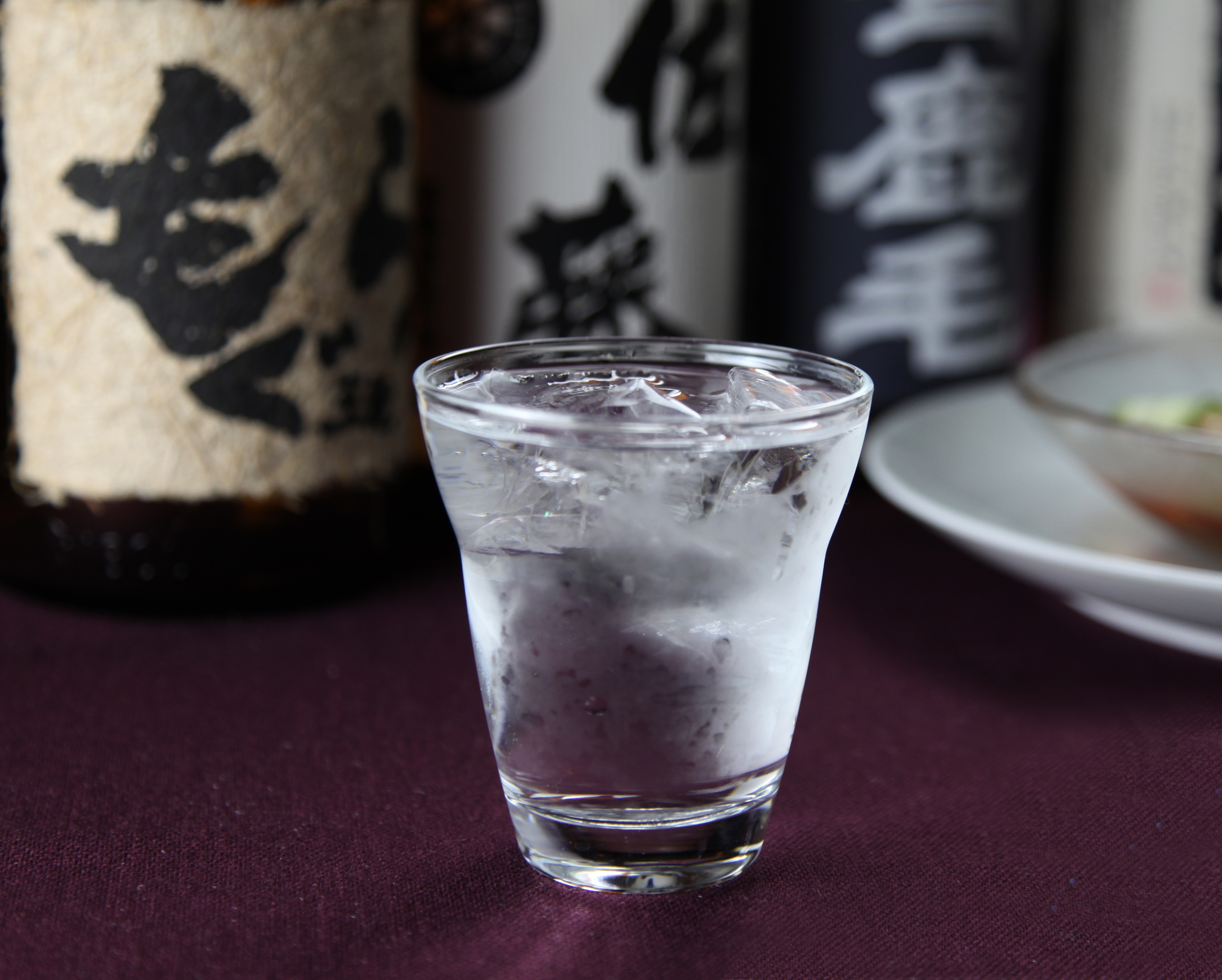
Imo Jōchū (Japanese spirits made with sweet potato)

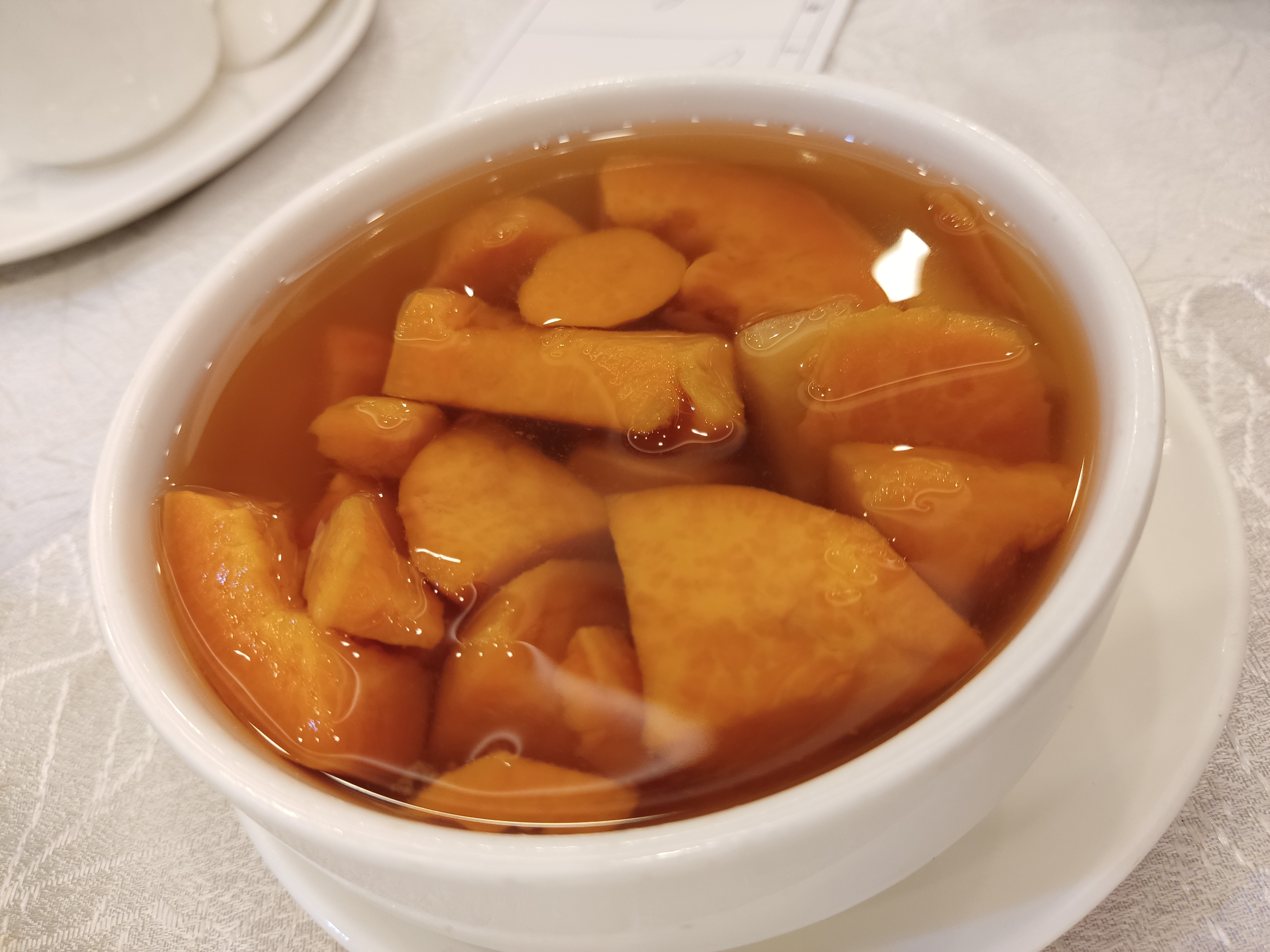
Chinese sweet potato soup, popular during the winter

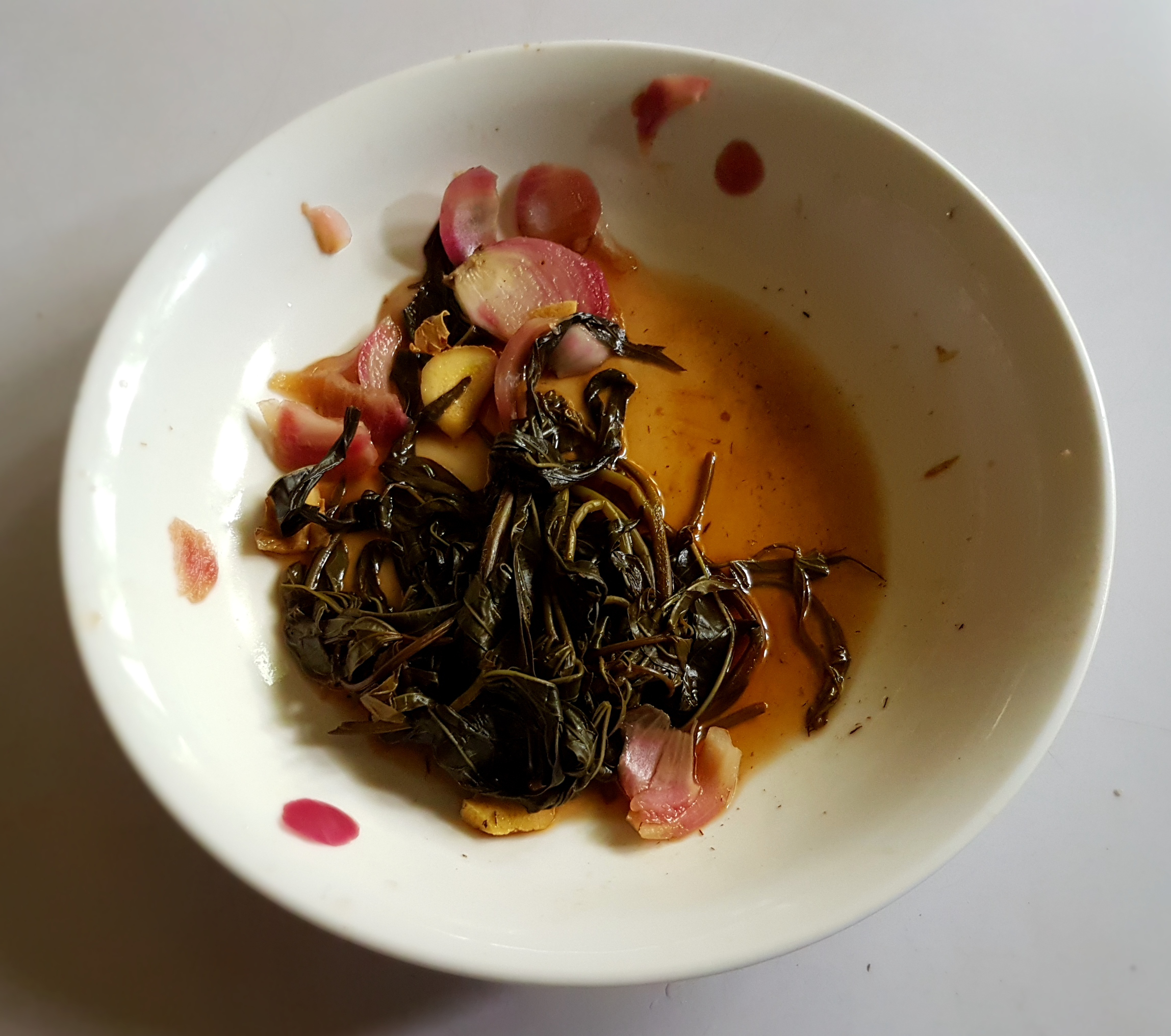
Camote tops, a Philippine salad made from young sweet potato leaves (talbos ng kamote)

==== United States ====
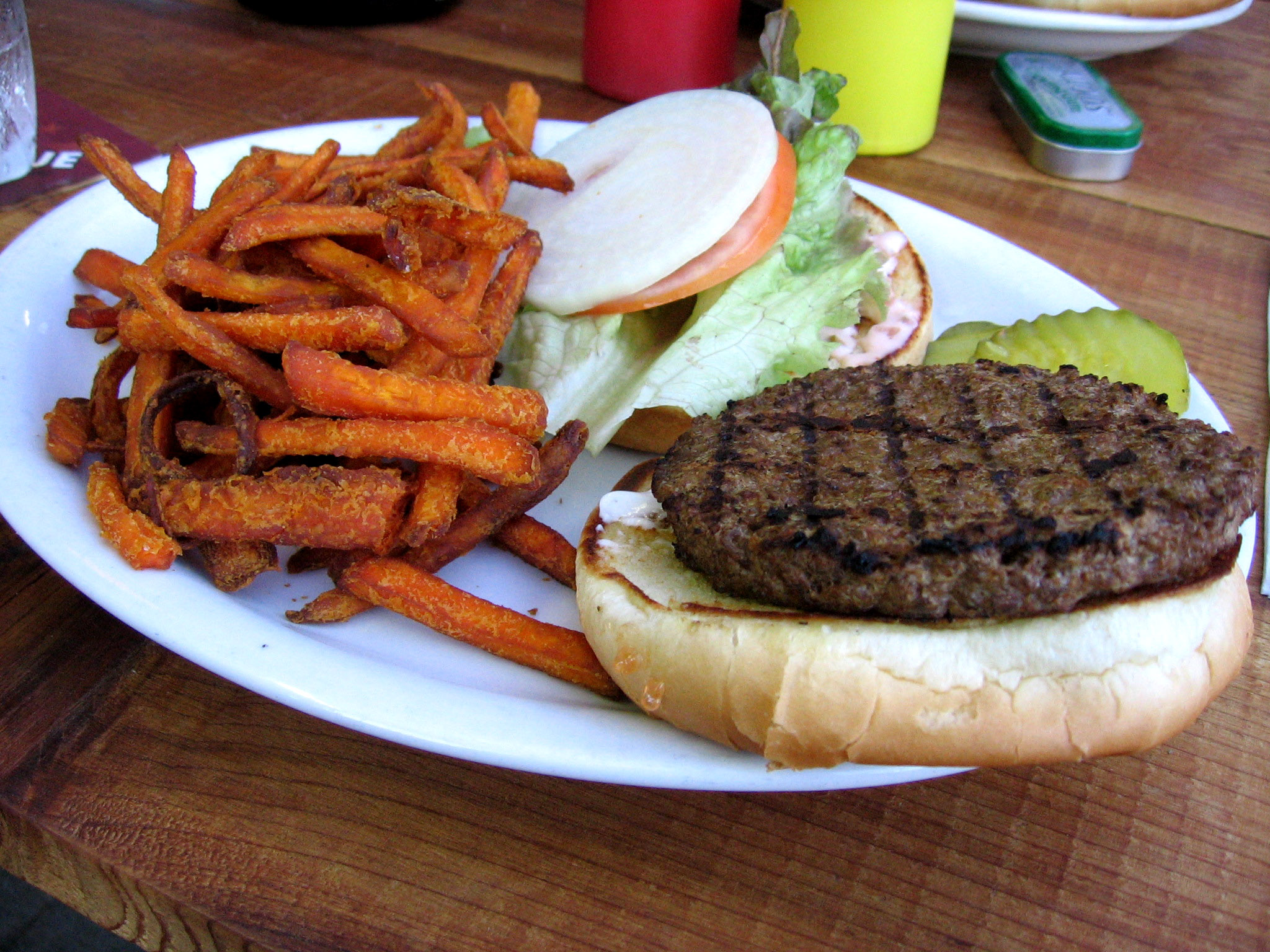
Sweet potato fries with a vegetarian burger

Candied sweet potatoes are a side dish consisting mainly of sweet potatoes prepared with brown sugar, marshmallows, maple syrup, molasses, orange juice, marron glacé, or other sweet ingredients. It is often served in the United States on Thanksgiving. Sweet potato casserole is a side dish of mashed sweet potatoes in a casserole dish, topped with a brown sugar and pecan topping.

The sweet potato became a favorite food item of the French and Spanish settlers, thus beginning a long history of cultivation in Louisiana. Sweet potatoes are recognized as the state vegetable of Alabama, Louisiana, and North Carolina. Sweet potato pie is also a traditional favorite dish in Southern U.S. cuisine. Another variation on the typical sweet potato pie is the Okinawan sweet potato haupia pie, which is made with purple sweet potatoes.

The fried sweet potatoes tradition dates to the early nineteenth century in the United States. Sweet potato fries or chips are a common preparation and are made by julienning and deep-frying sweet potatoes in the fashion of French fried potatoes. Roasting sliced or chopped sweet potatoes lightly coated in animal or vegetable oil at high heat became common in the United States at the start of the 21st century, a dish called "sweet potato fries". Sweet potato mash is served as a side dish, often at Thanksgiving dinner or with barbecue.

John Bettencourt Avila, an Azorean immigrant to California, is known as the "father of the sweet potato industry" in North America. Avila planted sweet potatoes from the Azores on a small 20 acre plot of land near Merced in 1888, and eventually spread their cultivation throughout the Sacramento and San Joaquin valleys.

==== Oceania ====
Māori grew several varieties of small, yellow-skinned, finger-sized kūmara (with names including taputini, taroamahoe, pehu, hutihuti, and rekamaroa) that they had brought with them from east Polynesia. Modern trials have shown that these smaller varieties were capable of producing well, but when American whalers, sealers and trading vessels introduced larger cultivars in the early 19th century, they quickly predominated.

Prior to 2021, archaeologists thought that the sweet potato failed to flourish in New Zealand south of Christchurch due to the colder climate, forcing Māori in those latitudes to become (along with the Moriori of the Chatham Islands) the only Polynesian people who subsisted solely on hunting and gathering. However, a 2021 analysis of material excavated from a site near Dunedin, some 250 km (160 mi) further south, revealed that sweet potatoes were grown and stored there during the 15th century, before the industry was disrupted by factors speculated to be due to the Little Ice Age.

Māori traditionally cooked kūmara in a hāngī (earth oven). This is still a common practice when there are large gatherings on marae.

In 1947, black rot (Ceratocystis fimbriata) appeared in kūmara around Auckland and increased in severity through the 1950s. A disease-free strain was developed by Joe and Fay Gock. They gave the strain to the nation, earning them the Bledisloe Cup in 2013.

There are three main cultivars of kūmara sold in New Zealand: 'Owairaka Red' ("red"), 'Toka Toka Gold' ("gold"), and 'Beauregard' ("orange"). The country grows around 24,000 metric tons of kūmara annually, with nearly all of it (97%) grown in the Northland Region. Kūmara are widely available throughout New Zealand year-round, where they are a popular alternative to potatoes.

Kūmara are often included in roast meals, and served with sour cream and sweet chili sauce. They are served alongside such vegetables as potatoes and pumpkin and as such, are generally prepared in a savory manner. They are ubiquitous in supermarkets, roast meal takeaway shops and hāngī. Kūmara are sometimes prepared as fries.

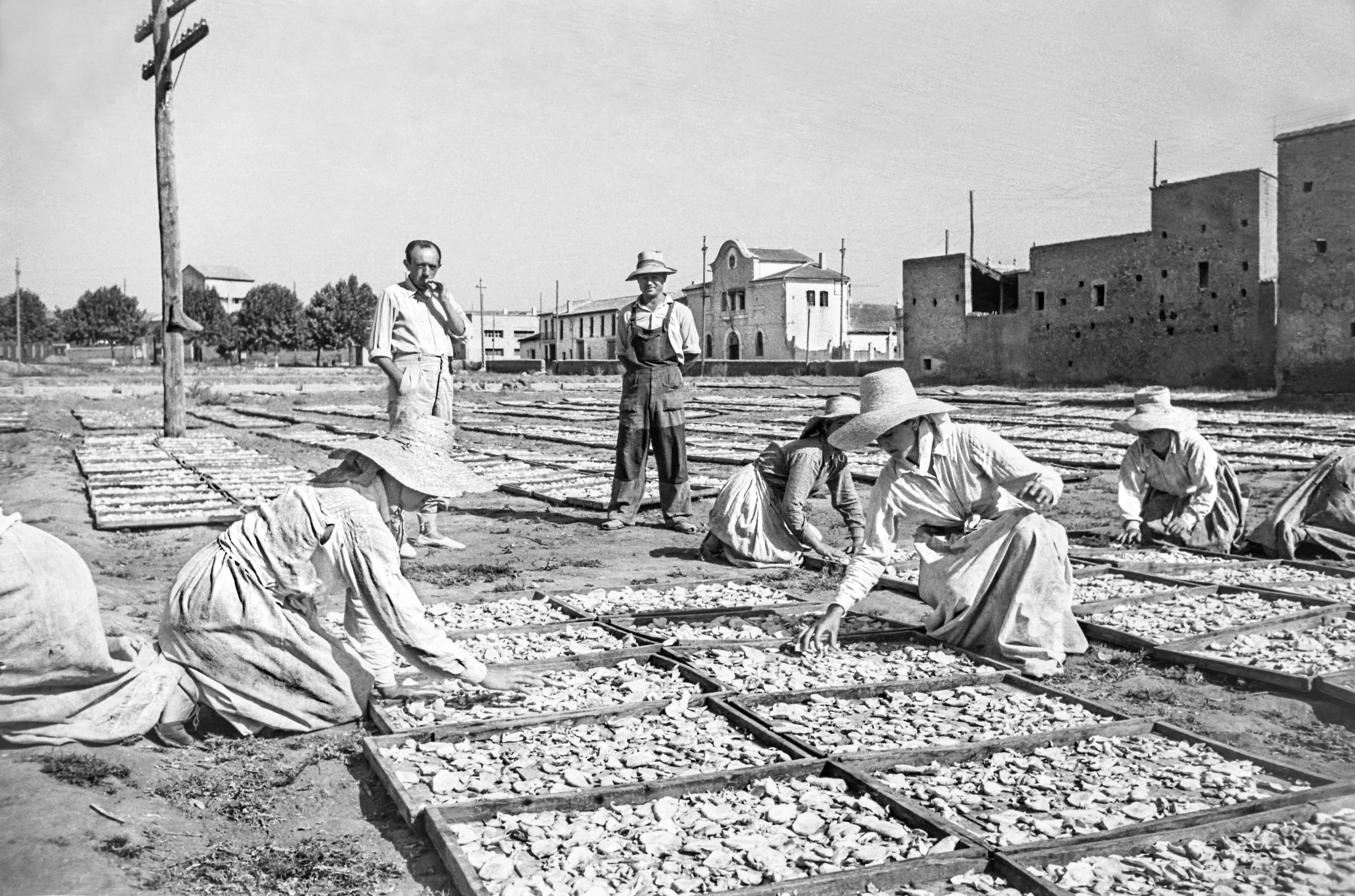
Drying sweet potatoes (Ribera Alta, 1951)

Among the Urapmin people of Papua New Guinea, taro (known in Urap as ima) and the sweet potato (Urap: wan) are the main sources of sustenance, and in fact the word for 'food' in Urap is a compound of these two words.

==== Europe ====
In the Veneto (northeast Italy), sweet potato is known as patata mericana in the Venetian language (patata americana in Italian, meaning "American potato"), and it is cultivated above all in the southern area of the region;.

In Spain, sweet potato is called boniato. On the evening of All Souls' Day, in Catalonia (northeastern Spain) it is traditional to serve roasted sweet potato and chestnuts, panellets and sweet wine. The occasion is called La Castanyada. As of 2023 Spain is the largest sweet potato producer in Europe.

==== South America ====
In Peru, sweet potatoes are called camote and are frequently served alongside ceviche. Sweet potato chips are also a commonly sold snack, be it on the street or in packaged foods.

Dulce de batata is a traditional Argentine, Paraguayan and Uruguayan dessert, which is made of sweet potatoes. It is a sweet jelly, which resembles a marmalade because of its color and sweetness but it has a harder texture, and has to be sliced into thin portions with a knife as if it were a pie.

==== Globally ====
Globally, sweet potatoes are now a staple ingredient of modern sushi cuisine, specifically used in maki rolls. The advent of sweet potato as a sushi ingredient is credited to the chef Bun Lai of Miya's Sushi, who first made sweet potato rolls in the 1990s as a plant-based alternative to traditional fish-based sushi rolls.

=== Molecular gastronomy ===
Freezing a sweet potato until solid, baking at a low temperature, then increasing to a high temperature brings out the sweetness by caramelizing converted sugars.

=== Ceramics ===
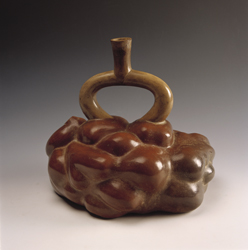
Sweet potato, Moche culture, 300 CE, Larco Museum Collection

Ceramics modeled after sweet potatoes or camotes are often found in the Moche culture.

=== Dyes ===
In South America, the juice of red sweet potatoes is combined with lime juice to make a dye for cloth. By varying the proportions of the juices, every shade from pink to black can be obtained. Purple sweet potato color is also used as a natural food coloring.

=== Aquariums ===
Cuttings of sweet potato vine, either edible or ornamental cultivars, will rapidly form roots in water and will grow in it, indefinitely, in good lighting with a steady supply of nutrients. For this reason, sweet potato vine is ideal for use in home aquariums, trailing out of the water with its roots submerged, as its rapid growth is fueled by toxic ammonia and nitrates, a waste product of aquatic life, which it removes from the water. This improves the living conditions for fish, which also find refuge in the extensive root systems.

=== Ornamentals ===
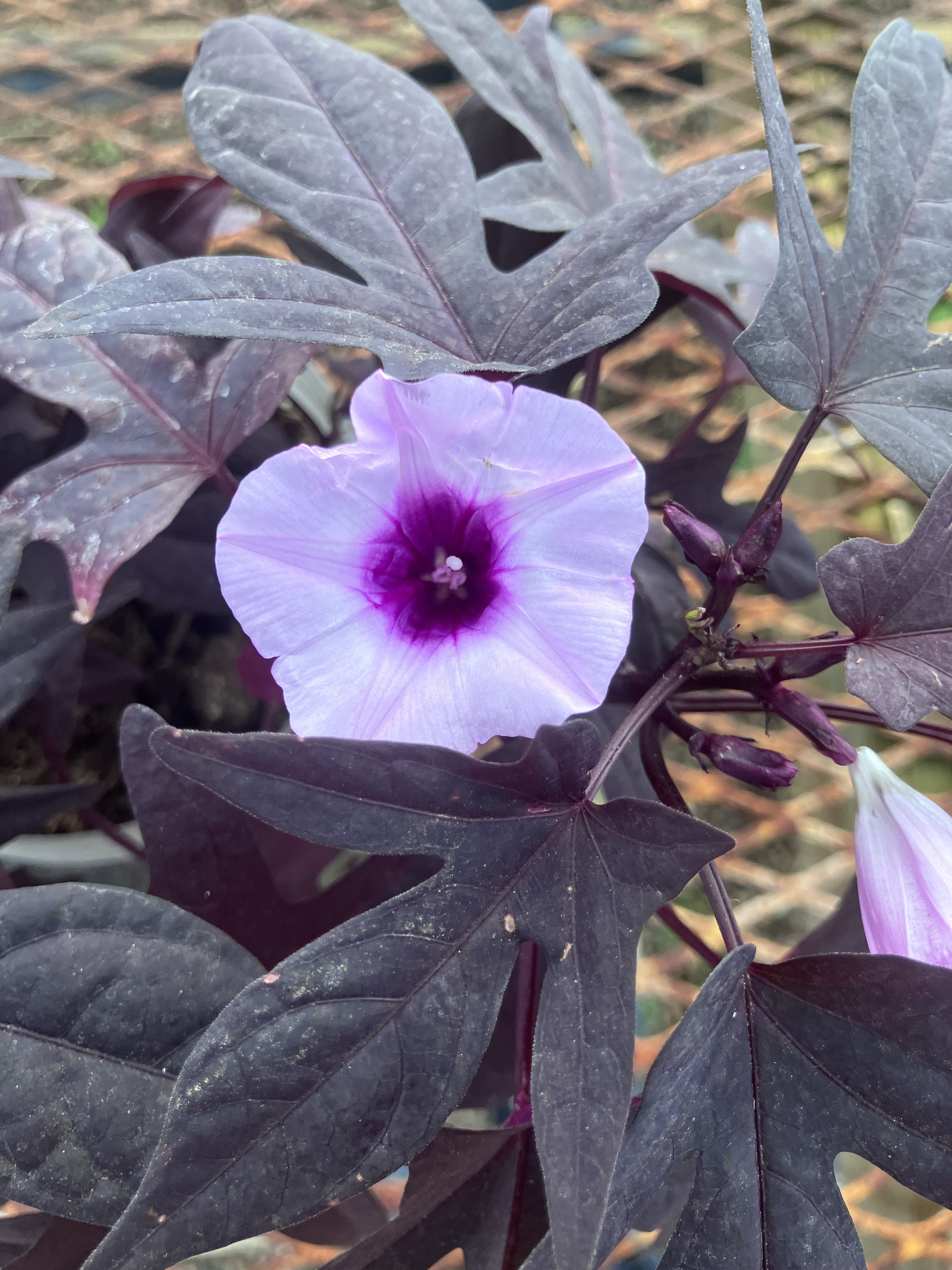
An ornamental sweet potato flower

Ornamental sweet potatoes are popular landscape, container, and bedding plants. Grown as an annual in zones up to USDA hardiness Zone 9, they grow rapidly and spread quickly. Cultivars are available in many colors, such as green, yellow, and purple. Some ornamental varieties, like 'Blackie', flower more than others. These ornamental cultivars are not poisonous, and although the leaves are edible, the tubers do not have a good taste.

== See also ==
- Ipomoea aquatica (kangkong), another edible member of the morning glory family
- List of sweet potato dishes
