= Sweet potato storage =

The sweet potato (Ipomoea batatas) is a very important crop for subsistence farmers in Africa and developing countries in other regions. Its relatively short growing period, tolerance to drought and high yield from poor soils lead to its use as a famine reserve for many of these households. However, it is a highly perishable food source that is susceptible to destruction by microorganisms, metabolic spoilage, physical destruction and pests. Therefore, it is not generally stored for long after harvest. This is a major barrier for the optimal use of the crop and causes much waste.

Most subsistence farmers who eat sweet potato do not use a storage technique of any kind, instead using a method of continuous cultivation and leaving the tubers in the ground until they are ready to be used. While less common, simple methods of storage do exist. The common ones include pit, clamp, and indoor storage and all extend the storage time of sweet potatoes by some degree. Maintaining proper storage temperature is probably the most significant barrier to good storage for subsistence farmers.

Pretreatment of sweet potato can help to minimize risk of losses. Curing can toughen the skin and heal minor physical damage, while drying can reduce spoilage and inactivate metabolic degradation.

Optimum storage of sweet potatoes occurs at 12–16 °C (54–61 °F) and 85–90% relative humidity (RH) and requires proper ventilation to remove excess carbon dioxide (CO_{2}) and bring in oxygen (O_{2}) for respiration. At these conditions sweet potatoes have been shown to last 5 months to a maximum of a year compared to 2–3 months normally.

== Susceptibility to spoilage ==
Sweet potatoes are a highly perishable crop and difficult to store for extended periods of time. This is mainly due to their high moisture content, metabolic activity following harvesting and thin, permeable skin. Following harvest, sweet potatoes are susceptible to spoilage by physical, physiological, pathological and environmental means, including by pests.

=== Physical ===
Physical losses occur when sweet potatoes are damaged by mechanical force during harvest, handling, and transportation of the tubers, including injury by cutting, bruising, and skinning. Delicate skin and poor harvesting and handling techniques are the main cause of these problems. Damage to tubers by physical means can be minimized by handling the tubers carefully and storing them in rigid boxes or cartons rather than cloth sacks.

=== Physiological ===
Physiological processes within the plant can contribute highly to spoilage. Natural transpiration causes water loss and results in an unappealing pithy texture. Respiration also continues after harvesting, and a buildup of CO_{2} around the crop can cause early spoilage. During long-term storage, tubers sprout, which is useful if they are to be planted but not if they are to be eaten, as sprouting consumes nutrients in the tubers. Sprouting can be inhibited by preharvest spraying with maleic hydrazide, treatment of tubers with methyl ester of naphthalene acetic acid (MENA) in acetone on paper spread between tubers and 0.5–4.0% thiourea solution.

=== Pathological and pests ===
Sweet potatoes are susceptible to a number of species of fungi, bacteria and virus. Infection can result in the production of toxins, pathogens, bitter flavours, surface blemishes, and decayed tissue. Two common sources of infection are the fungus Rhizopus oryzae (soft rot) and Botryodiplodia (Java black rot). These are responsible for 78% of sweet potato infections in Bangladesh. The pest of greatest concern for farmers is the sweet potato weevil (Cylas spp.), which can enter the tuber prior to harvesting, proliferate in storage, and cause up to 50% loss in yields. Simple techniques can be used to minimize the threat of the sweet potato weevil. Storage of the potatoes in temperatures under 20 °C (68 °F) can kill up to 89.5% of weevils in an infected crop. Dipping the tubers in hot water also has been shown as an effective intervention to control infestations. Damage to tubers by physical and physiological means can increase the chance of pathological infection and pest infestation.

=== Environmental ===
The length of time for which sweet potatoes may be stored is highly dependent on temperature and relative humidity. Storage in temperatures lower than 10 °C (50 °F) will cause chill injury in sweet potatoes. This is characterized by discoloration of the insides of the tuber, which can range from brown to black instead of the usual orange. Formation of hard areas also occurs that remain even after cooking. Other signs of chill injury include production of off flavours; internal cell structure breakdown; and increased rotting due to reduced skin formation, which allows fungal infection. Conversely, temperatures above 16 °C (61 °F) raise rates of respiration and sprouting in tubers and increase activity by microorganisms. Relative humidity under 80% will cause excessive water loss while RH above 90% will cause condensation and thereby accelerate rotting.

== Ideal storage conditions ==
To minimize potential spoilage, precise storage conditions should be met. Sweet potato tubers should be stored in an environment no warmer than 16 °C (61 °F) and no cooler than 12 °C (54 °F) or 13 °C (55 °F), with a RH of 85–90%. Under these optimum conditions sweet potatoes have been shown to keep for 5 months up to a maximum of about a year. Proper ventilation of the storage area is important to maximizing potential storage time. The tubers' respiration produces CO_{2}, which acts to increase the rate of spoilage. The tubers can convert approximately 57 cubic decimetres (3,500 cu in) of oxygen per ton per day to CO_{2} and need ventilation to compensate for this. The O_{2} in the storage environment should not fall below 7% and CO_{2} must not exceed 10%. Because of a lack of proper equipment, maintaining adequate temperature conditions is the largest hurdle that farmers in developing countries face.

Not all sweet potato tubers are suitable for storage. Tubers that are mechanically damaged, infested with pests, infected by pathogens, rotten, or sprouting should not be stored. These factors will increase the rate of spoilage and can increase losses in the rest of the stored crop.

== Storage methods ==
In developed countries, proper refrigeration technology is used to store sweet potatoes for long periods of time. Many poor farmers do not have access to refrigeration or even electricity and so must rely on other storage methods. There are several methods of storage that require only simple and cheap building materials. The most commonly used are pit storage, clamp storage and indoor storage. These techniques are used only sporadically, however, as most farmers practice sequential harvesting, in which tubers are left in the ground until needed.

=== In-ground ===
In subsistence farming, sweet potatoes are commonly left in the ground and eaten or sold directly following harvest; this is called piecemeal or sequential harvesting. Sweet potatoes are delicate and easily damaged. In-ground storage is used to protect the tubers while reducing the work required to set up storage facilities. In areas with reliable rainfall patterns, farmers can maintain a supply of fresh sweet potatoes for most of the year by continuous cultivation and harvesting. In drier places, however, such as northern Uganda, this is impractical. This is not a long-term option and the plants will degrade after a short period of time. There are numerous disadvantages to this method, as it takes up field space that could otherwise be used for growing more crops.

=== Pit storage ===
Storing the potatoes in a pit in the ground is a simple and cheap method. Pit storage differs from in-ground storage in that tubers are collected and kept together and considerations are made to control the storage environment.

The construction of the pit can vary with what materials are available, but those commonly used include grass, soil, wood, lime, sawdust, and ash. Grass is typically used to line the bottom and sides of the pit to insulate the tubers from temperature changes and to absorb moisture. Before being added to the pit, grass should be flamed in order to destroy any pests that may be hiding within. Soil is used to seal the roof of the pit and as filler. Wood and plant material can be used to strengthen walls and to build a roof to cover the pit., which is beneficial in that the roof can help protect the tubers from rain and provide shade to cool them. Lime may have some effectiveness in absorbing CO_{2} and removing it from the storage environment. Sawdust is used to cushion the tubers and to help control condensation on them. Wood ash can applied to potatoes prior to storage and has shown some effectiveness in protecting against attack by insects and mould.

To prevent rotting, the pit should ideally be dug into a slope to promote drainage. The pit should be approximately 0.5 metres (1.6 ft) below the surface. It should also be situated at least 0.35 metres (1.1 ft) above the water table during the dry season and must remain above the water table during the wet or rainy season.

There can be ventilation problems with this storage method. Commonly the pit will be sealed shut in order to maintain a good RH, which has the disadvantage that CO_{2} will collect and cause spoilage. To mitigate this problem, a sizable headspace should be maintained in the pit to promote airflow.

Pits can be reused, but they should first be cleaned and the soil turned over and disinfected with fire or sulphur to rid the area of microorganisms.

Losses are still fairly high with this technique, though it has been shown in some instances to keep tubers for 2–4 months.

=== Clamp and mound storage ===
In clamp storage, another simple and low-cost method, sweet potato tubers are stored in covered piles. The tubers in the best condition are selected, stacked in a heap on a layer of grass, and covered in layers of grass and soil. As with pit storage, ash, lime, and sawdust can be used for added effect. The piles may be made at ground-level or in shallow or deep trenches. Drainage should be considered and ruts may be made in the ground to lead off water. The clamps may be covered with a roof or kept in a building for added protection. To minimize losses due to respiration, a ventilation shaft can be added. This technique gives fairly poor results and an estimated storage time of 2–3 months.

=== Indoor storage ===
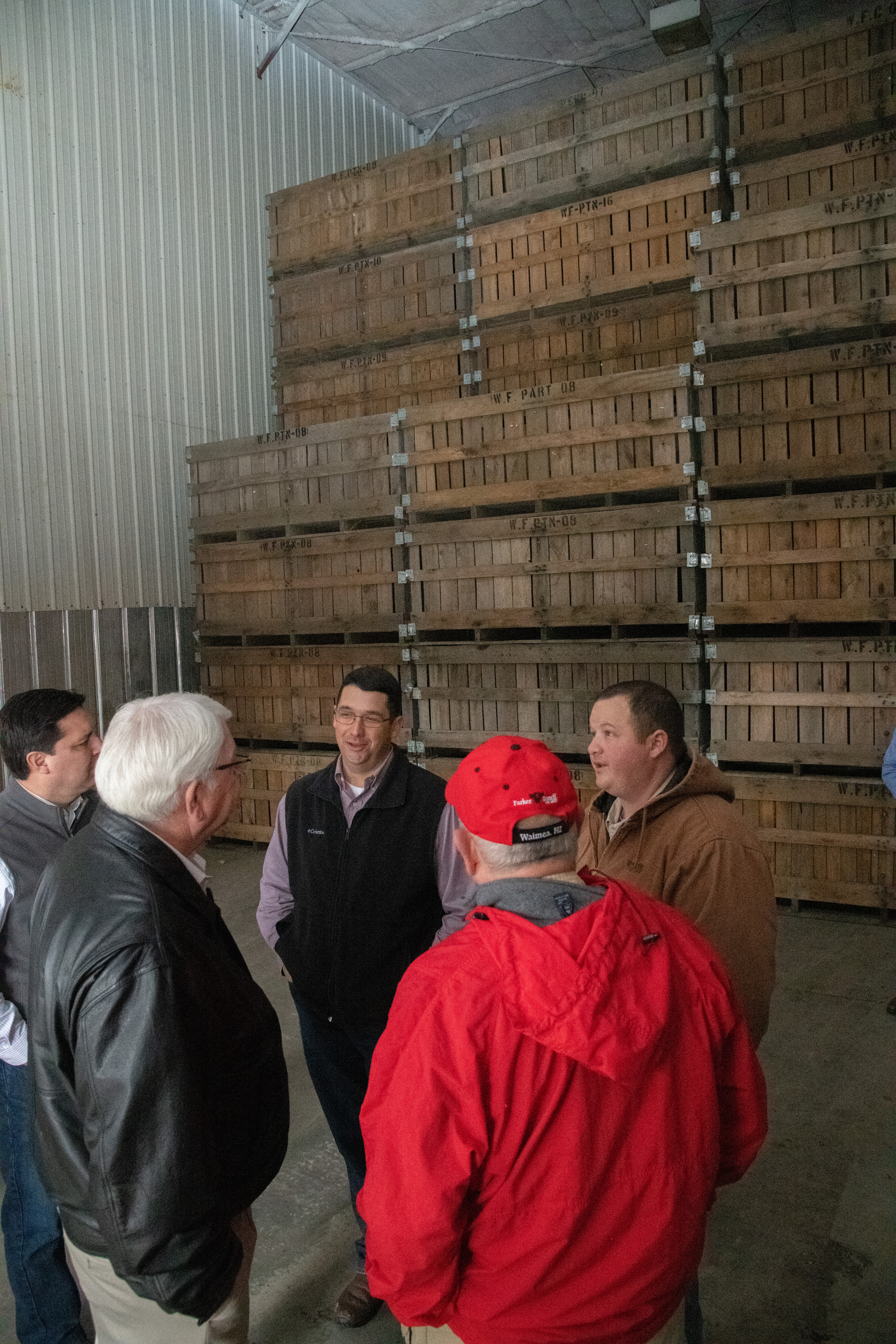
Sweet potatoes crates in a warehouse

Sweet potatoes may be harvested and stored in a building. They can be stored in a living area of a home or in a granary built specifically to store produce. In homes, the tubers are typically stored in straw woven baskets, cloth bags, or wooden boxes. Baskets and boxes are better at protecting the tubers from mechanical damage. If possible, tubers should be kept elevated above the ground to keep them away from rodents and other pests. This is an effective technique for maintaining proper ventilation, but, depending on the type of building, maintaining proper storage temperature and RH may be difficult.

Granaries and other buildings used to store sweet potatoes typically are round huts with walls made of straw, mud, clay, and wood and a conical straw roof. These are commonly elevated above the ground by a system of legs to keep the crop dry and away from rodents and other pests.

== Pretreatment of sweet potatoes ==
Typically sweet potatoes are stored and eaten fresh. However, there are some simple methods used to increase their durability in storage that can be used as additions to other storage methods. Drying and curing of sweet potatoes are two common methods to prepare them prior to storage.

Tubers that are too damaged to be stored fresh but still have edible material on them may be dried, which can be accomplished by slicing the tubers to a thickness of approximately 2–4 millimetres (1/16–3/16 in) and then laying them out in the sun for four days or until they are rid of most of their moisture. During drying, the potatoes can be covered in prickly bushes or thorns to ward off animals. Dried slices can be kept indoors or in raised silos until they are to be eaten. Drying removes moisture, reduces bacterial growth, and inhibits metabolic processes and enzymatic decomposition.

Curing is a technique used to toughen the outer layer of skin (periderm). This protects against excessive moisture loss, reduces entry of microorganisms into the plant, and facilitates healing of mechanically damaged tubers. Whole tubers are cured by exposing them to a moderately high temperature for several days, beginning immediately after harvest. A combination of a temperature of 30–32 °C (86–90 °F) and RH of 80–95% for 4–10 days has been found to be adequate for curing. A common method to cure tubers without incubation equipment is to wrap the tubers in black polyethylene sheets and leave them in the sun for five days. The black plastic sheets hold moisture in and collect heat to produce the necessary conditions for curing. Immediately after curing, the temperature of the tubers must be lowered quickly to prevent them from sprouting.
