= Curing (vegetable preservation) =

Curing is a technique for preservation of (usually edible) vegetable material. It involves storing the material in a prescribed condition immediately after harvest.

== Purposes ==
=== Wound healing ===
In root and tuber crops such as potatoes and carrots, curing refers to waiting for the healing of wounds by periderm formation. Doing so prolongs shelf life and reduces water loss.

=== Drying ===
==== Bulb drying ====
In bulb crops such as onion and garlic, curing is the process of drying of the neck tissues and of the outer leaves to form dry scales.

==== Leaf drying ====
In leaf crops such as cannabis, tobacco, and tea, curing is a short aging process that dries the product and stops biological processes. For cannabis, this process reduces the content of sugars and chlorophyll.

==== Seed drying ====
Vanilla is cured for storage; the beans are killed, sweated (oxidation), slow-dried, and conditioned.
