= Candied sweet potatoes =

Sweet potato preparation

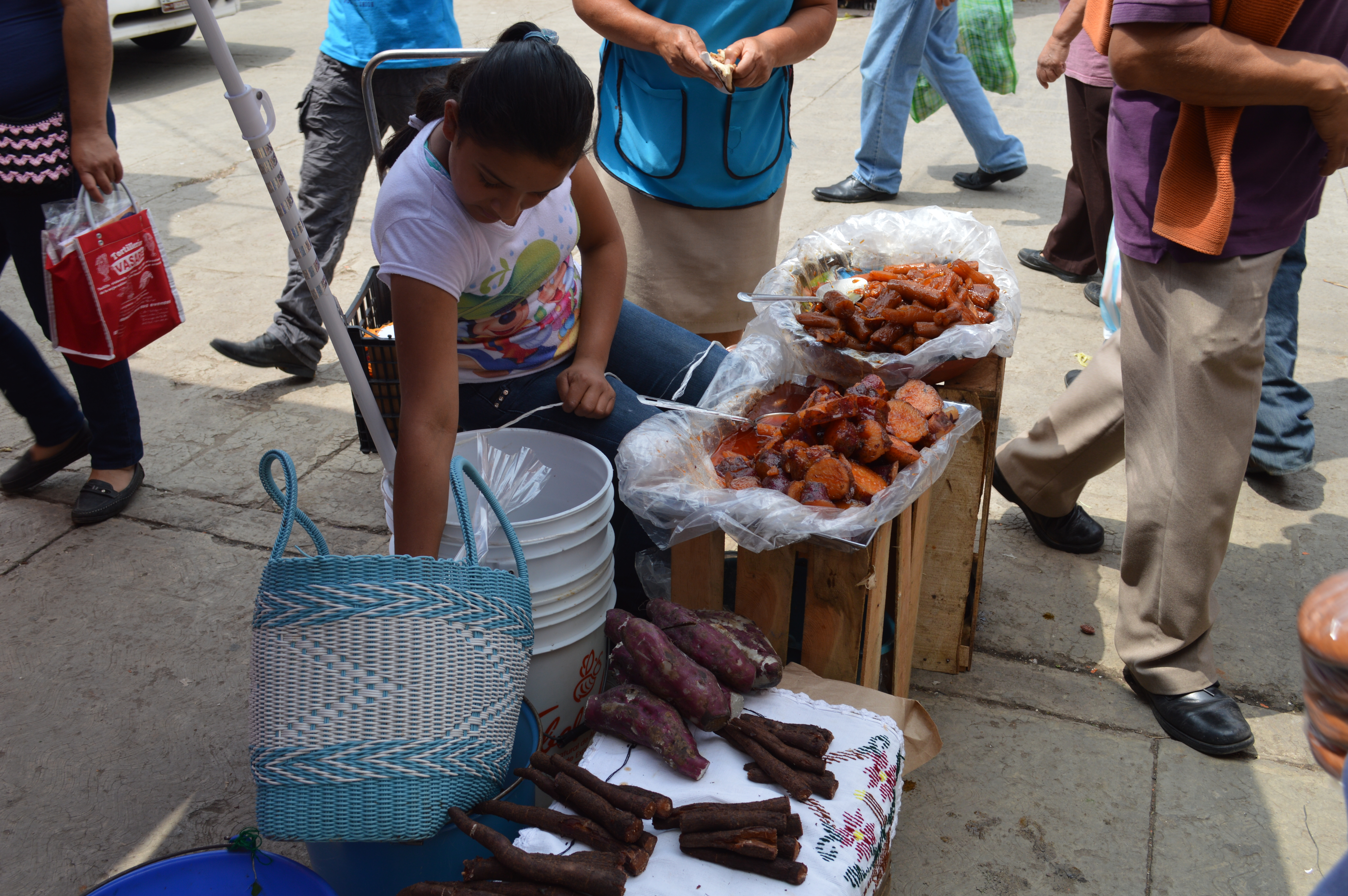
Camotes enmielados for sale in Tenancingo, Mexico State

Candied sweet potatoes are prepared in several cultures.

== History ==
Sweet potatoes are native to the Americas. They were encountered by Christopher Columbus on Hispaniola (in modern day Haiti) on his first voyage, and by the early 16th century they had been brought back to Europe and established in areas of Spain, Italy and France. Growing poorly in the cooler areas outside of southern Europe, over the course of the 16th century sweet potatoes came to be regarded as a luxury in the continent's north. Candying small pieces was a particularly common preparation. In the mid-17th century, a dish of cooked potatoes with a sugary, buttery, and spiced topping appears in a London cookbook, which the historian Trudy Eden describes as "more than likely" intended as a sweet potato dish and the "forerunner" of the modern American dish of candied yams. It instructed cooks:

Boyle or roast your Potatoes very tender, and blanch them; cut them into thin slices, put them into a dish or stewing pan, put to them three or foure Pippins sliced thin, a good quantity of beaten Ginger and Cynamon, Verjuice, Sugar, and Butter; stew these together an hour very softly; dish them being stewed enough, putting on them Butter, Verjuice beat together, and stick it full of green Sucket or Orrengado, or some such Liquid sweet-meat; sippit it and scrape Sugar on it, and serve it up hot on the Table.

During the 19th century in the American South, a dish of candied sweet potatoes under the name "candied yams" was eaten in the American South by poor people, both white and black. Early evidence of consumption appears in the 1880s, when recipes appeared in several cookbooks. One of these, in Mary Stuart Smith's Virginia Cookery Book (1885), tells readers that by boiling or steaming sweet potatoes, slicing them, adding butter and a covering of sugar, "you can hardly have a dish on your table that will be more generally relished." By the 1960s, the dish had become associated with the New Year among African Americans from the South.

== Candied yams ==
In the United States, candied sweet potatoes are eaten as a side under the name "candied yams", though this is a misnomer. While present in the early cookery of Colonial America, over time the yam became rare.

Candied yams are prepared with butter and brown sugar, and often topped with marshmallows. The dish is eaten at Thanksgiving, and is associated with Southern and African American cooking. The association with African-American cooking is shared by African Americans and non-African Americans alike. The dish is often paired with flavours of orange, and an accompaniment of ham.

== Outside of the US ==
In the Parsi cuisine of India, candied sweet potatoes are paired with chicken. In the Philippines, candied sweet potatoes are eaten as a street food under the name camote cue. They are made by frying slices of cream-coloured sweet potato (boniato) that are coated with brown sugar and placed on skewers to serve. Immediately after frying, their exterior is crisp while the interior is soft.

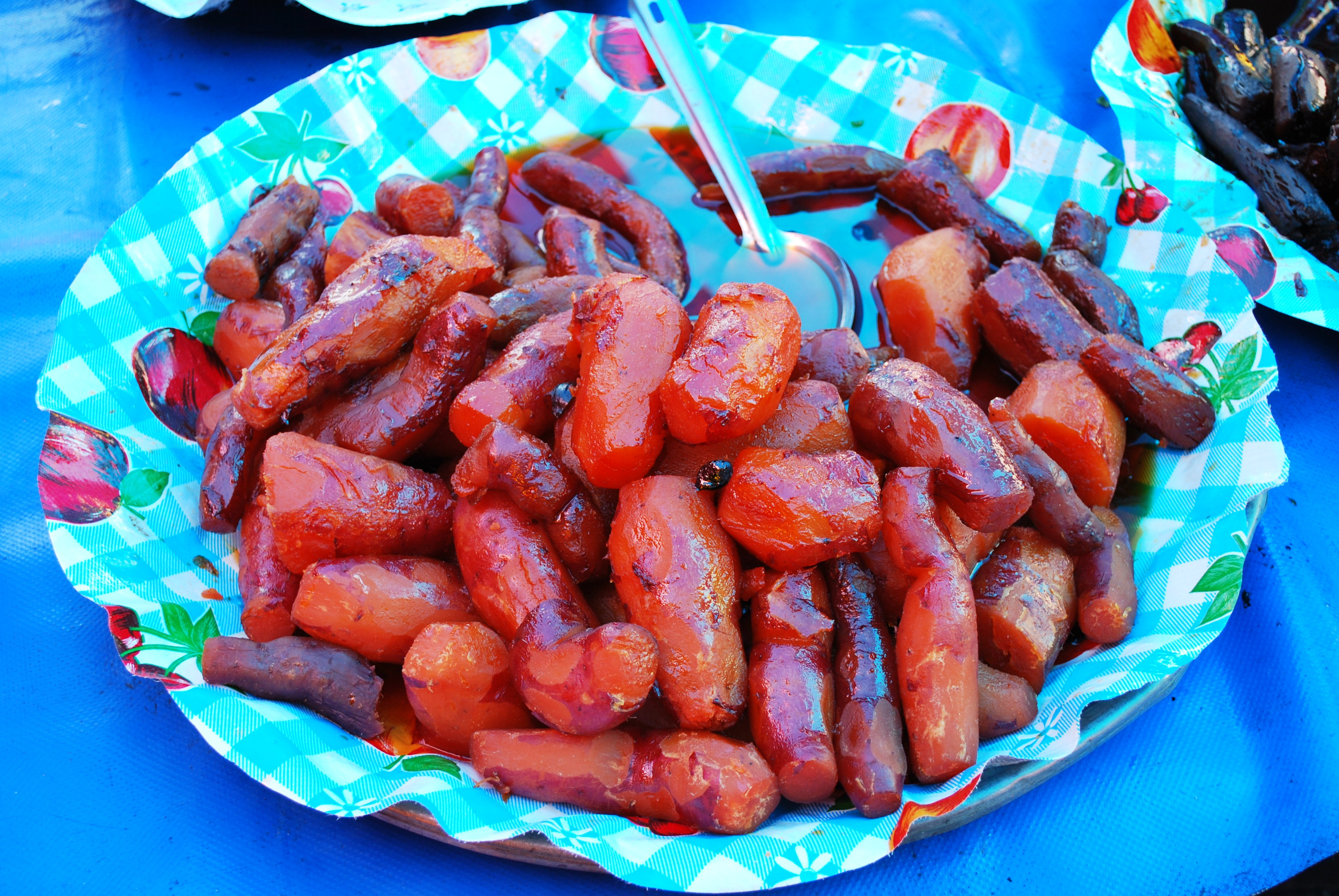
Camotes enmielados – Mexico

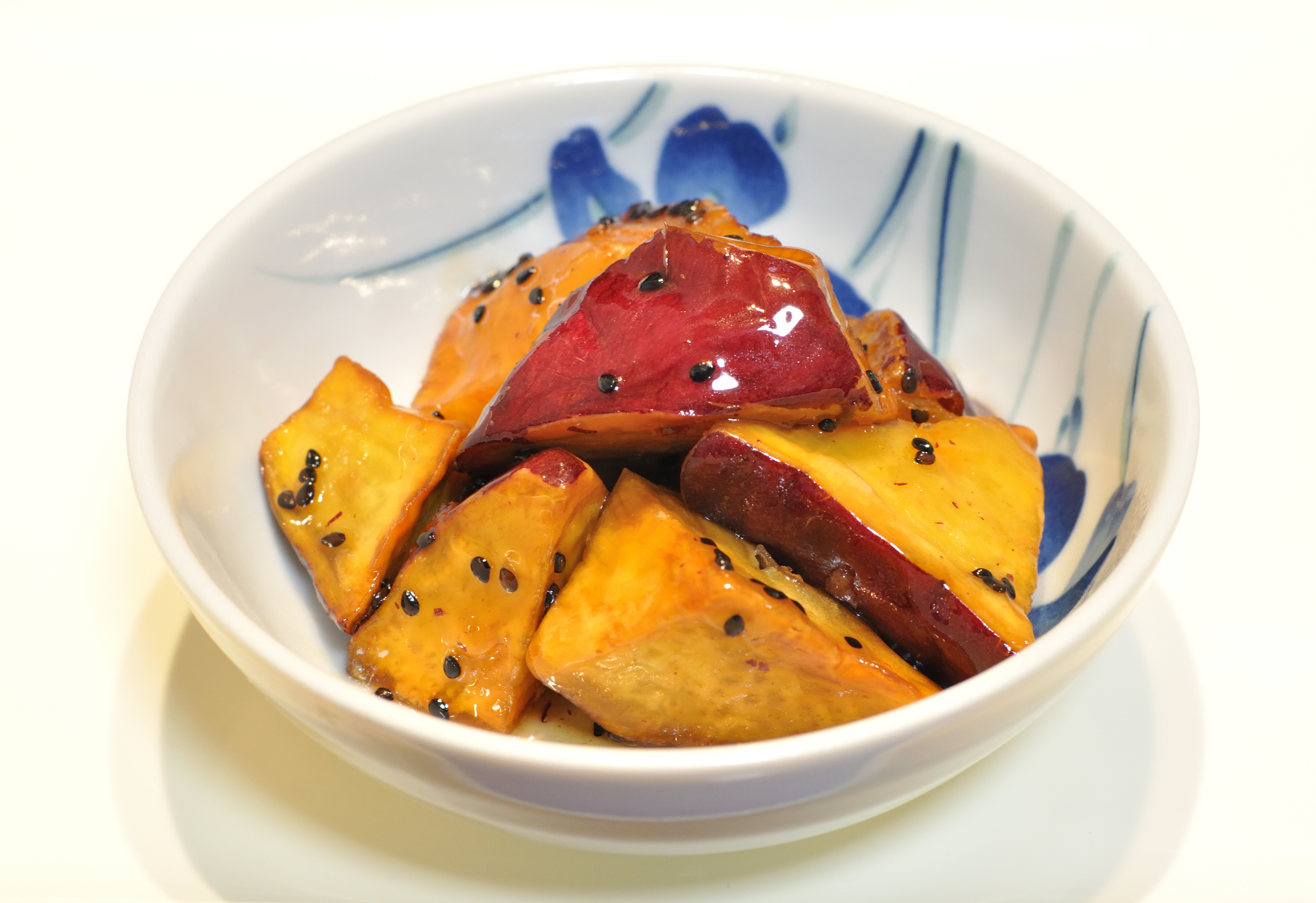
Daigaku Imo – Japan

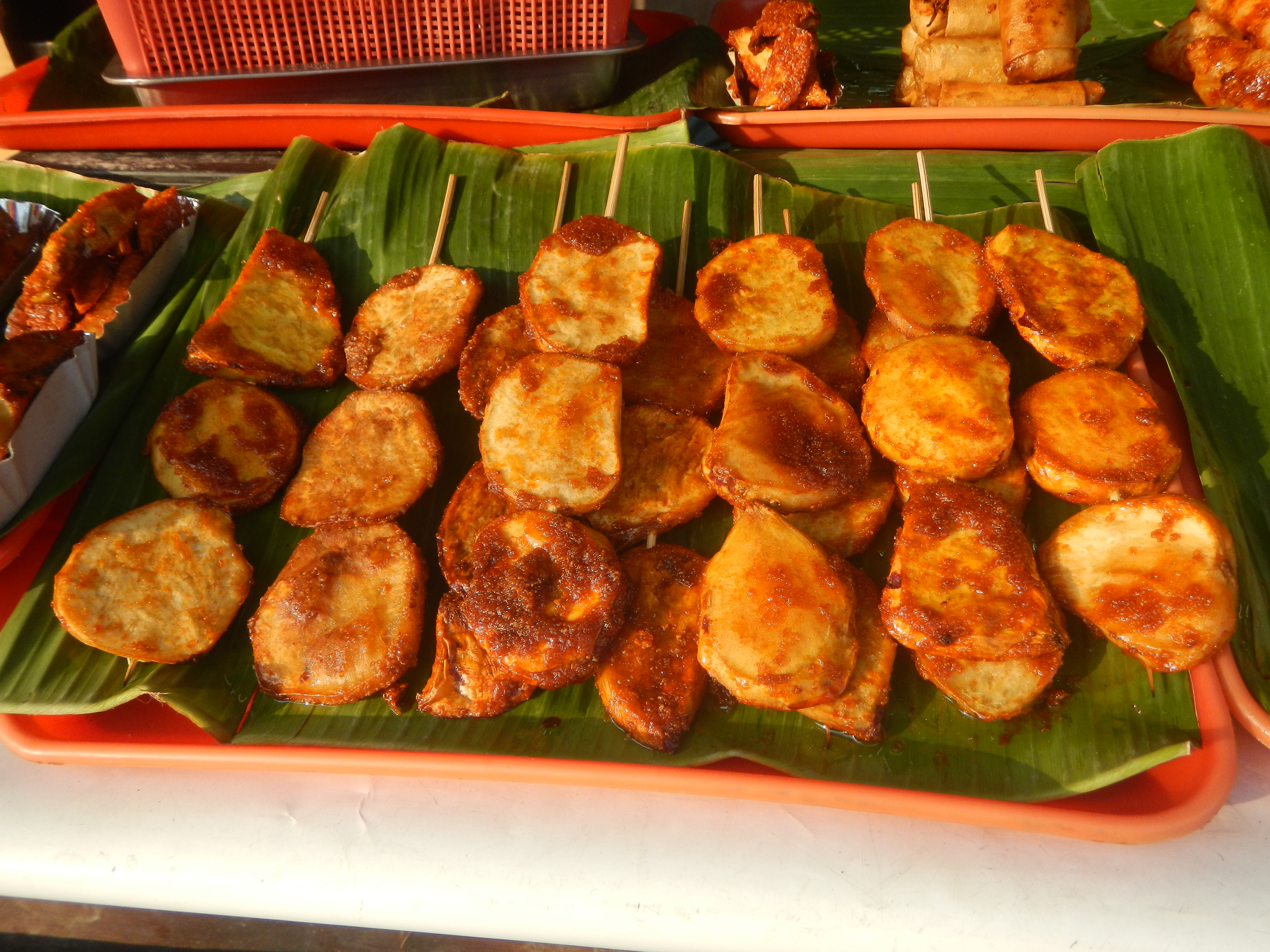
Camote cue – Philippines

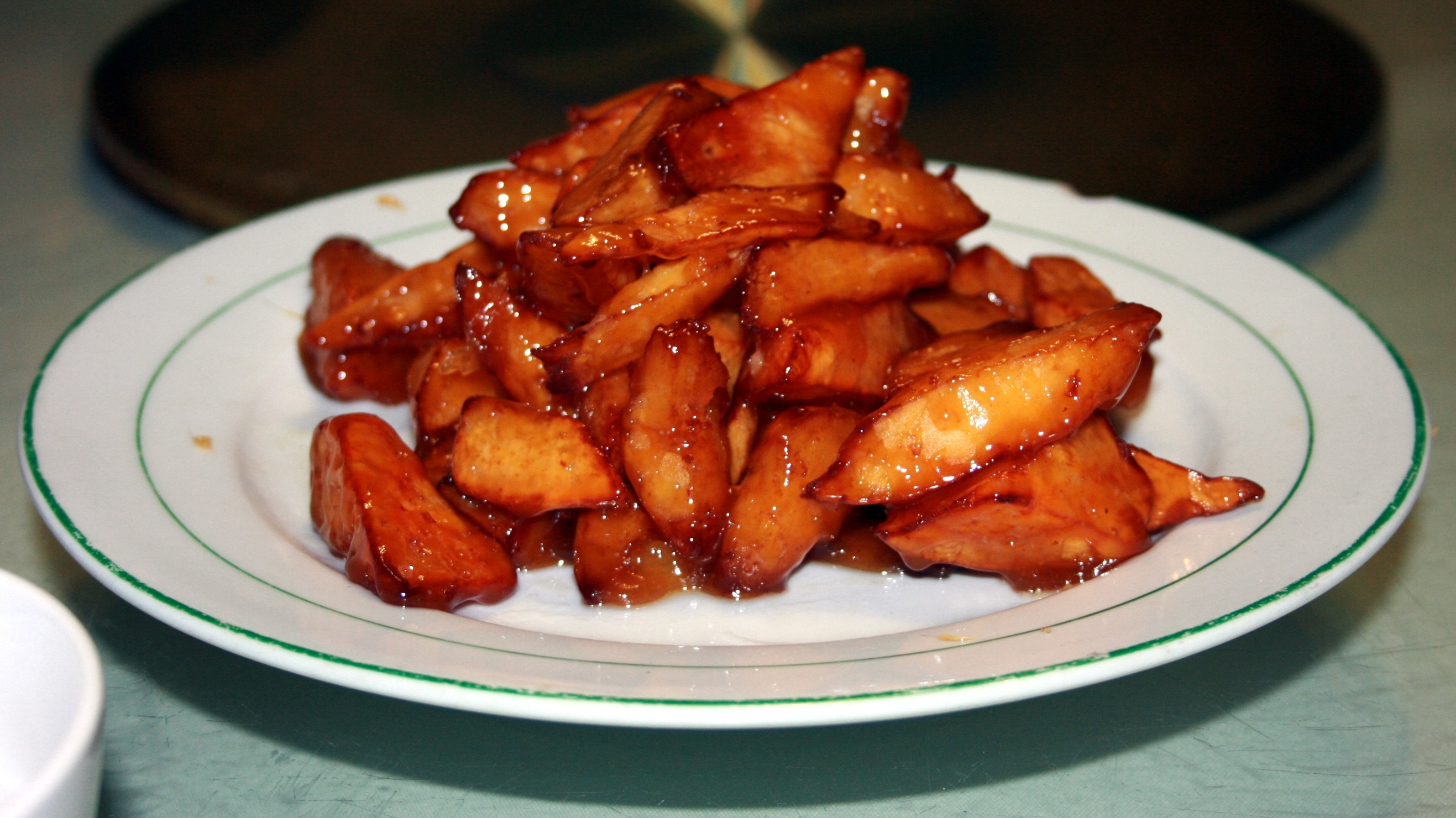
Basi digua – Shandong Province, China

== See also ==
- List of sweet potato dishes
- Candied fruit
- Dulce de batata
- Sweet potato pie

== Sources ==
- Arndt-Anderson, Heather (2011). "United States: The Pacific Northwest". In Albala, Ken (ed.). Food Cultures of the World Encyclopedia. Vol. 2. Bloomsbury Publishing. ISBN 978-0-313-37627-6.
- Eden, Trudy (2006). Cooking in America, 1590–1840. Westport, Connecticut: Greenwood Press. ISBN 0-313-33567-2.
- Fehribach, Paul (2023). Midwestern Food: A Chef's Guide to the Surprising History of a Great American Cuisine, with More Than 100 Tasty Recipes. University of Chicago Press. ISBN 978-0-226-81949-5.
- Grigson, Jane; Knox, Charlotte (1987) [1986]. Exotic Fruits and Vegetables. New York: Henry Holt and Company, Inc. ISBN 0-8050-0205-7.
- Hooker, Richard J (1981). Food and Drink in America: A History. Indianapolis, Indiana and New York: The Bobbs-Merrill Company, Inc. ISBN 0-672-52681-6.
- Opie, Frederick Douglass (2008). Hog and Hominy: Soul Food from Africa to America. New York: Columbia University Press. ISBN 978-0-231-14638-8.
- Pinkard, Susan (2009). A Revolution in Taste: The Rise of French Cuisine, 1650–1800. New York: Cambridge University Press. ISBN 978-0-521-82199-5.
- Ponseca, Nicole; Trinidad, Miguel (2018). I Am a Filipino: And This Is How We Cook. New York: Artisan. ISBN 9781579657673.
- Sen, Colleen Taylor (2004). Food Culture in India. Westport, Connecticut: Greenwood Publishing Group. ISBN 0-313-32487-5.
- Smith, Mary Stuart (1885). Virginia Cookery Book. New York: Harper and Bros.
- Smith, Andrew F (2013). Food and Drink in American History. Santa Barbara, California: ABC-CLIO. ISBN 978-1-61069-233-5.
- Stokes, Ashli Quesinberry; Atkins-Sayre, Wendy (2016). Consuming Identity: The Role of Food in Redefining the South. Jackson, Mississippi: University Press of Mississippi. ISBN 9781496809186.
- Williams-Forson, Psyche A (2006). Building Houses Out of Chicken Legs: Black Women, Food, and Power. Chapel Hill, North Carolina: The University of North Carolina Press. ISBN 978-0-8078-3022-2.
