= List of sweet potato dishes =

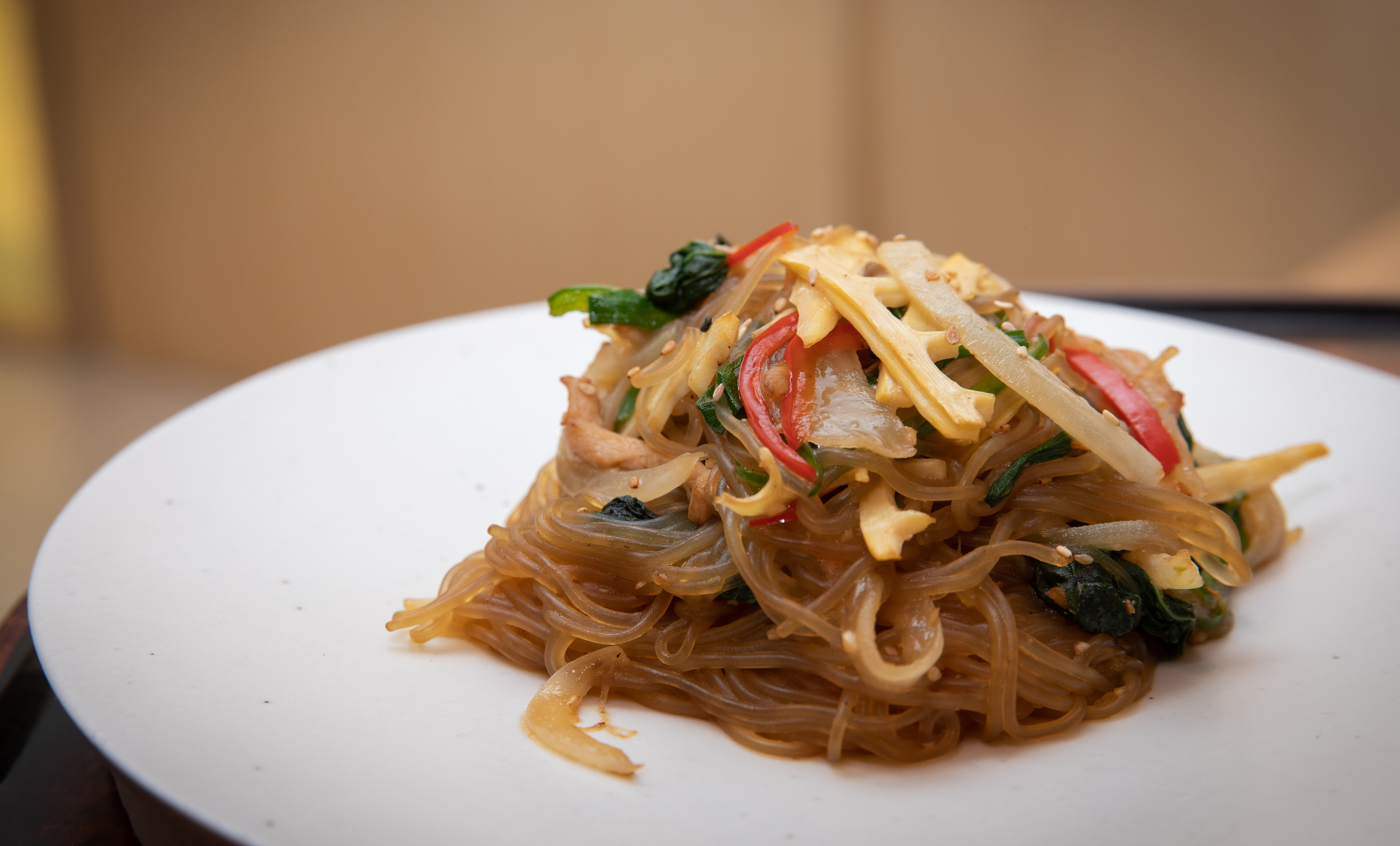
Japchae is typically prepared with dangmyeon, a type of cellophane noodle made from sweet potato starch

This is a list of notable sweet potato dishes. The sweet potato is a starchy, sweet-tasting tuberous roots used as a root vegetable. The young shoots and leaves are sometimes eaten as greens. The sweet potato is only distantly related to the common potato (Solanum tuberosum), both being in the order Solanales. Although darker sweet potatoes are often referred to as "yams" in parts of North America, the species is not a true yam, which are monocots in the order Dioscoreales.

== Sweet potato dishes ==
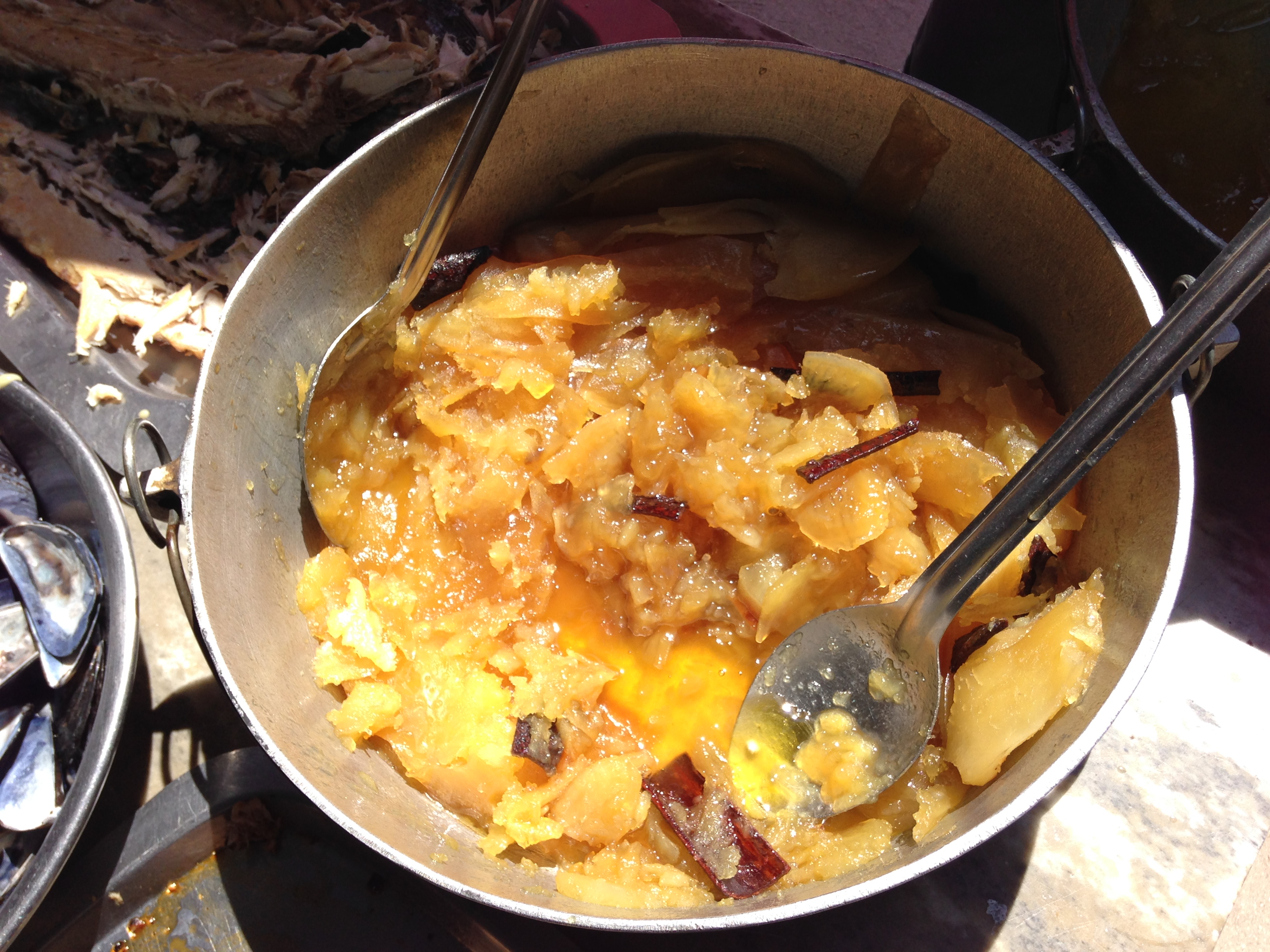
Soetpatats

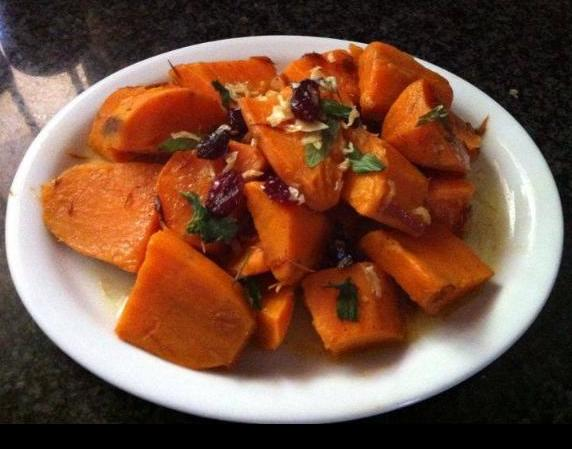
Sweet potato salad

- Camote cue – a popular snack food in the Philippines made from camote (sweet potato)
- Camote halaya – a variant of ube halaya that uses mashed sweet potato, it is sometimes known as "camote delight" or "sweet potato jam"
- Candied sweet potatoes – a preparation of sweet potato in various countries. One prominent example is the American "candied yams"
- Dulce de batata – a traditional Argentine, Paraguayan, Uruguayan and Brazilian sweet jelly dessert prepared using sweet potatoes. It resembles a marmalade because of its hard texture. In Brazil it is known as marrom glacê.
- Fried sweet potato – utilized in a variety of dishes and cuisines, a popular preparation is sweet potato fries
- Gane – a traditional regional dish from Kyushu, made primarily with fried sweet potatoes
- Hoshi-imo – generally consists of steamed, dried, sweet potatoes that are skinned and sliced, it is a snack food that is popular in Japan and similar to a number of other dried foods in Asia.
- Japchae – a savory and slightly sweet dish of stir-fried glass noodles and vegetables that is popular in Korean cuisine, it is typically prepared with dangmyeon (당면, 唐麵), a type of cellophane noodles made from sweet potato starch. The noodles are mixed with assorted vegetables, meat, mushrooms, and seasoned with soy sauce and sesame oil.
- Potato pancake – some variations of the potato pancake are made using sweet potatoes.
- Pudding and souse – a traditional dish in Barbadian cuisine consisting of pickled pork, pork blood pudding, grated and spiced sweet potatoes and pumpkin
- Purple sweet potato haupia pie – a Hawaiian dish that incorporates purple sweet potatoes and haupia, It is similar to the sweet potato pie that originated in the Southern United States. and is often prepared using Okinawan sweet potatoes which are purple in color.
- Roasted sweet potato – a popular winter street food in East Asia
- Soetpatats – an Afrikaans dish and originates from South Africa, it is commonly served as a side dish at braais (barbecues), often served alongside snoek (Thyrsites). It is often baked in a dutch oven and typically prepared using sweet potatoes, butter, brown sugar and cinnamon.
- Sweet potato pie – a traditional dessert originating in the Southern United States among the African American community, it is often served during the American holiday season, especially at Thanksgiving and Christmas in place of pumpkin pie.
- Sweet potato salad – an Arab salad prepared using sweet potato, onion, mashed garlic, raisins, olive oil and a variety of spices.
- Sweet potato soup – a Chinese dessert found in Southern China and Hong Kong
- Taro ball – a traditional Taiwanese cuisine dessert made of taro and sweet potato flour or potato flour
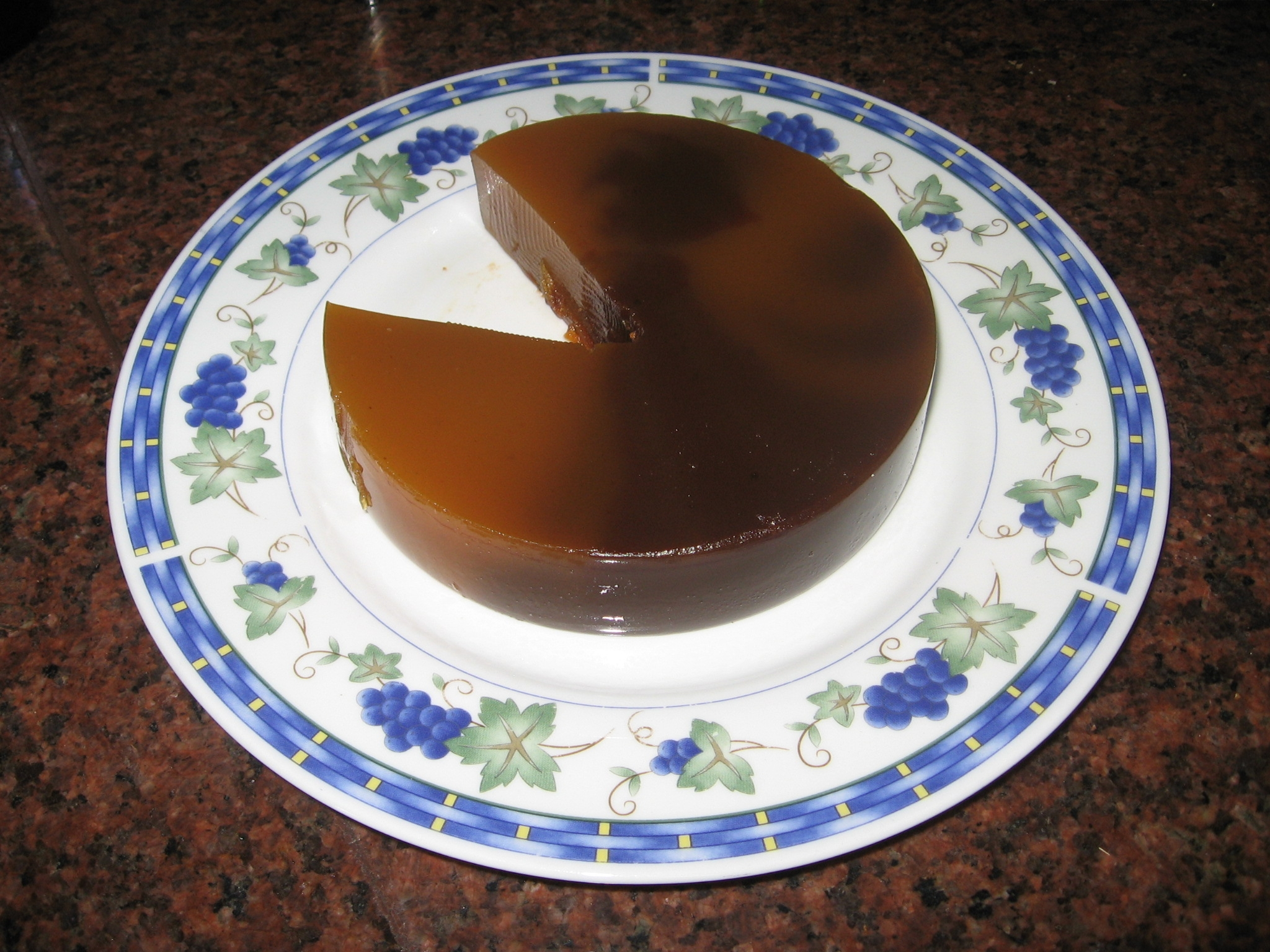
Dulce de batata with chocolate added

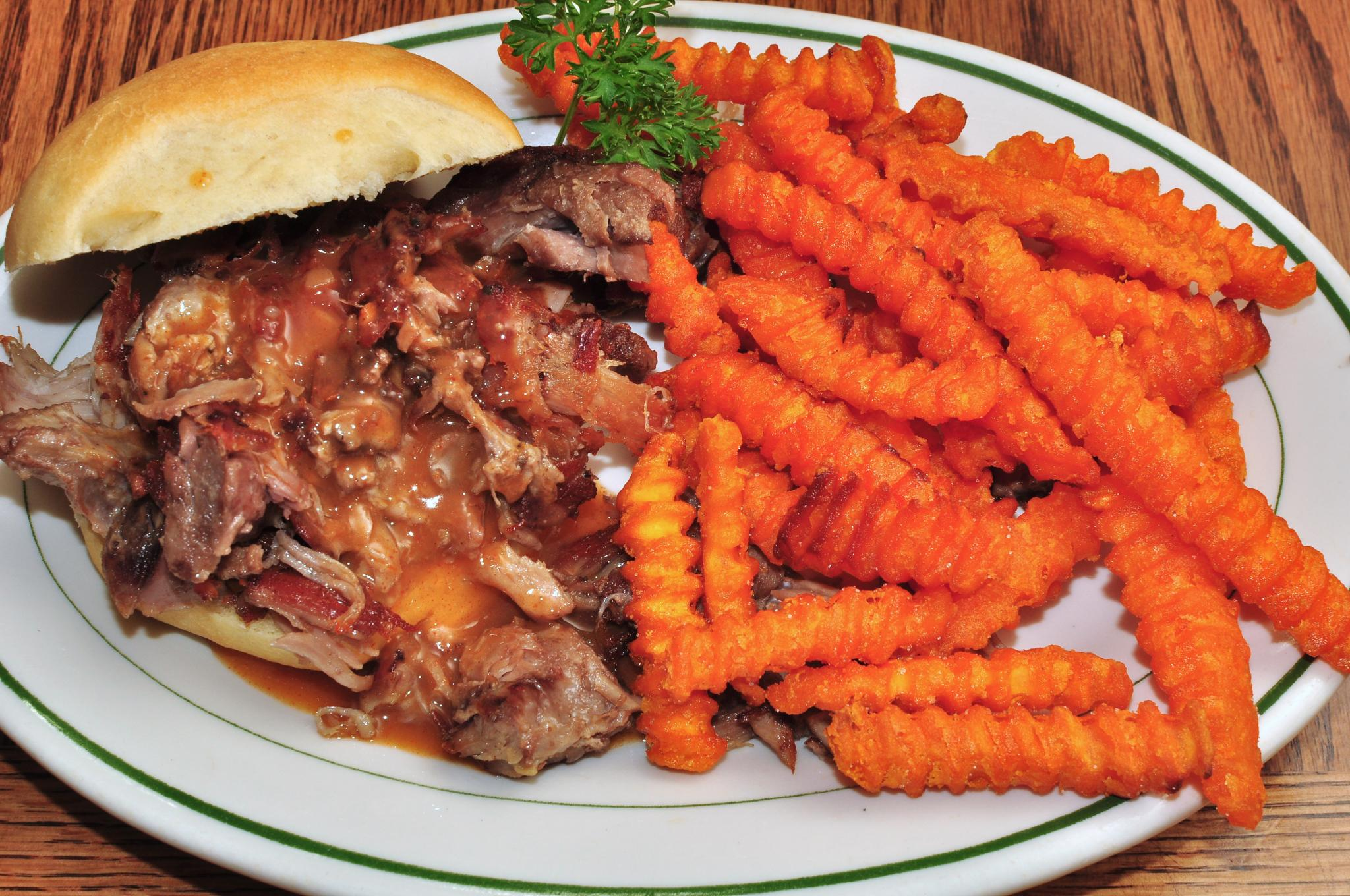
A side dish of crinkle cut fried sweet potatoes

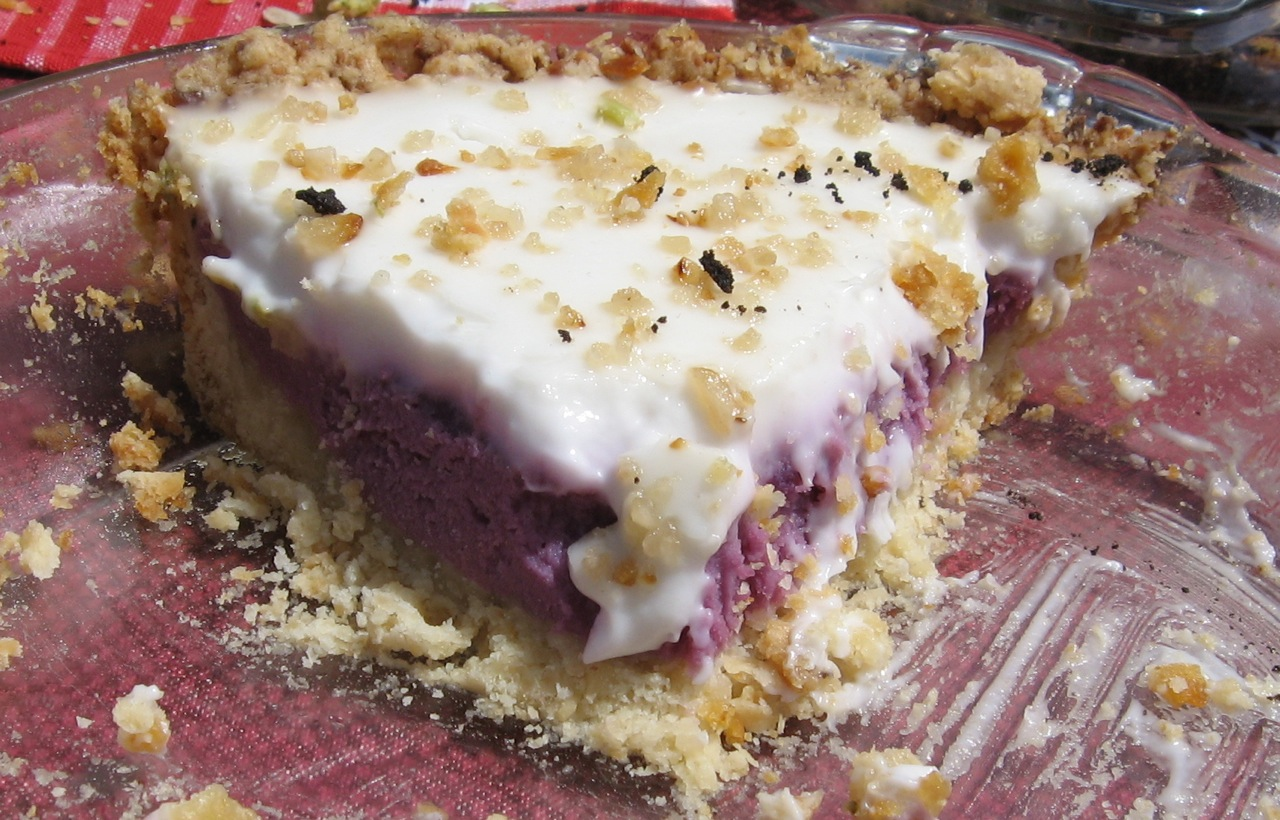
Purple sweet potato haupia pie

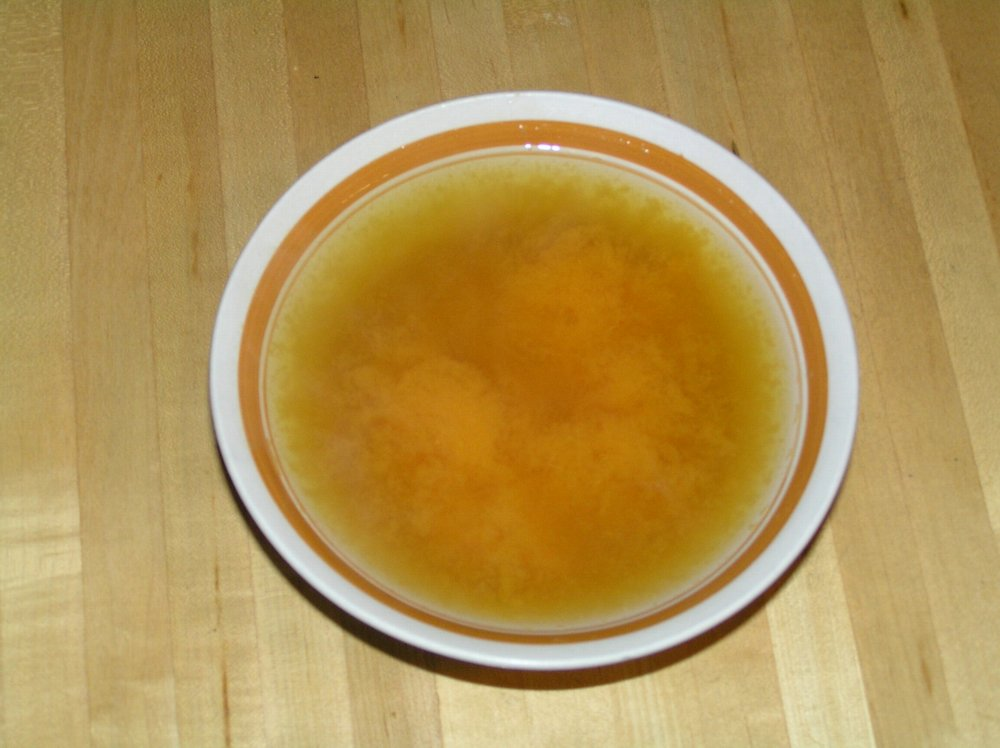
Sweet potato soup

=== Beverages ===
- Shōchū – a Japanese distilled beverage typically distilled from rice (kome), barley (mugi), sweet potatoes (satsuma-imo), buckwheat (soba), or brown sugar (kokutō), though it is sometimes produced from other ingredients such as chestnut, sesame seeds, potatoes, or even carrots.

== See also ==
- List of potato dishes
- List of sweet potato cultivars
- List of sweet potato diseases
- List of vegetable dishes
