= Sweet potato jam =

Sweet potato jam can refer to:

- Camote halaya, a traditional Filipino dessert made from mashed sweet potatoes, coconut milk, sugar, and butter
- Dulce de batata (or doce de batata), a traditional South American jelly made from sweet potatoes
