= Hoshi-imo =

Japanese sweet potato snack

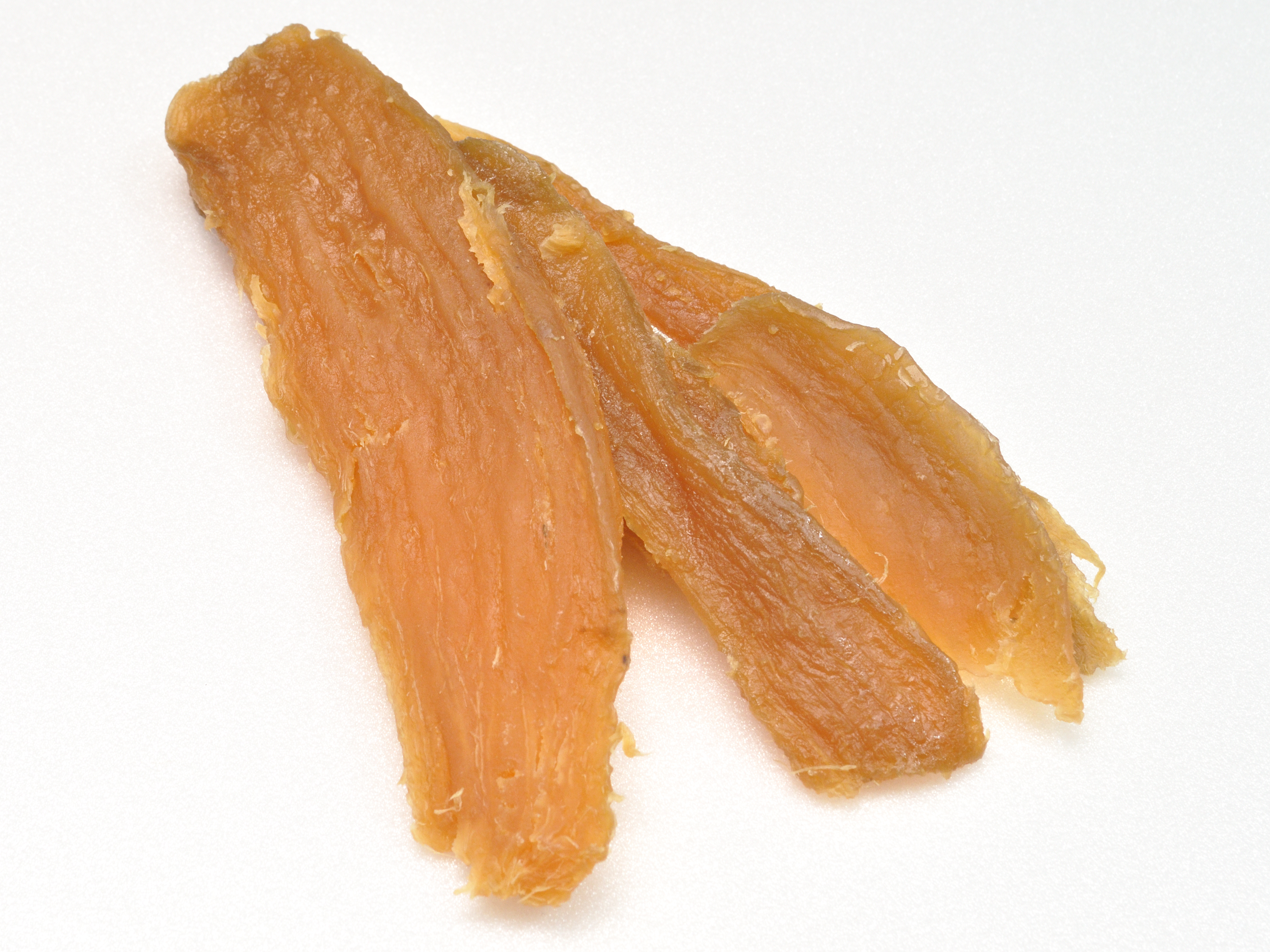
- Hoshi-imo, or dried sweet potato
- Place of origin: Japan
- Invented: 19th century
- Main ingredients: Sweet potatoes
- Food energy (per 100 g serving): 236–311 kcal (990–1,300 kJ)
Nutritional value
(per 100 g serving)
- Protein: 1-6 g
- Fat: 0-3 g
- Carbohydrate: 60-72 g
- Glycemic index: 55 (low)
- Similar dishes: whole roasted unskinned sweet potatoes (yaki-imo)

Hoshiimo (干し芋 "dried sweet potato") is a Japanese snack made of dried sweet potatoes and a specialty of Ibaraki Prefecture. The sweet potatoes are generally steamed first before peeling, slicing, and drying, with no artificial sweeteners added. In some cases, the sweet potatoes may be roasted rather than steamed. The surface may be covered with a white powder. Not to be mistaken for mold, this is a form of crystallized sugar that emerges as the sweet potatoes dry. With a chewy texture, it can be eaten raw or roasted.

== Names ==
Hoshi-imo goes by other names in Japan such as, kanso-imo (乾燥芋), mushi-kirihoshi (蒸切干), and kiriboshi kansho (切干甘藷).

== Varieties in Japan ==
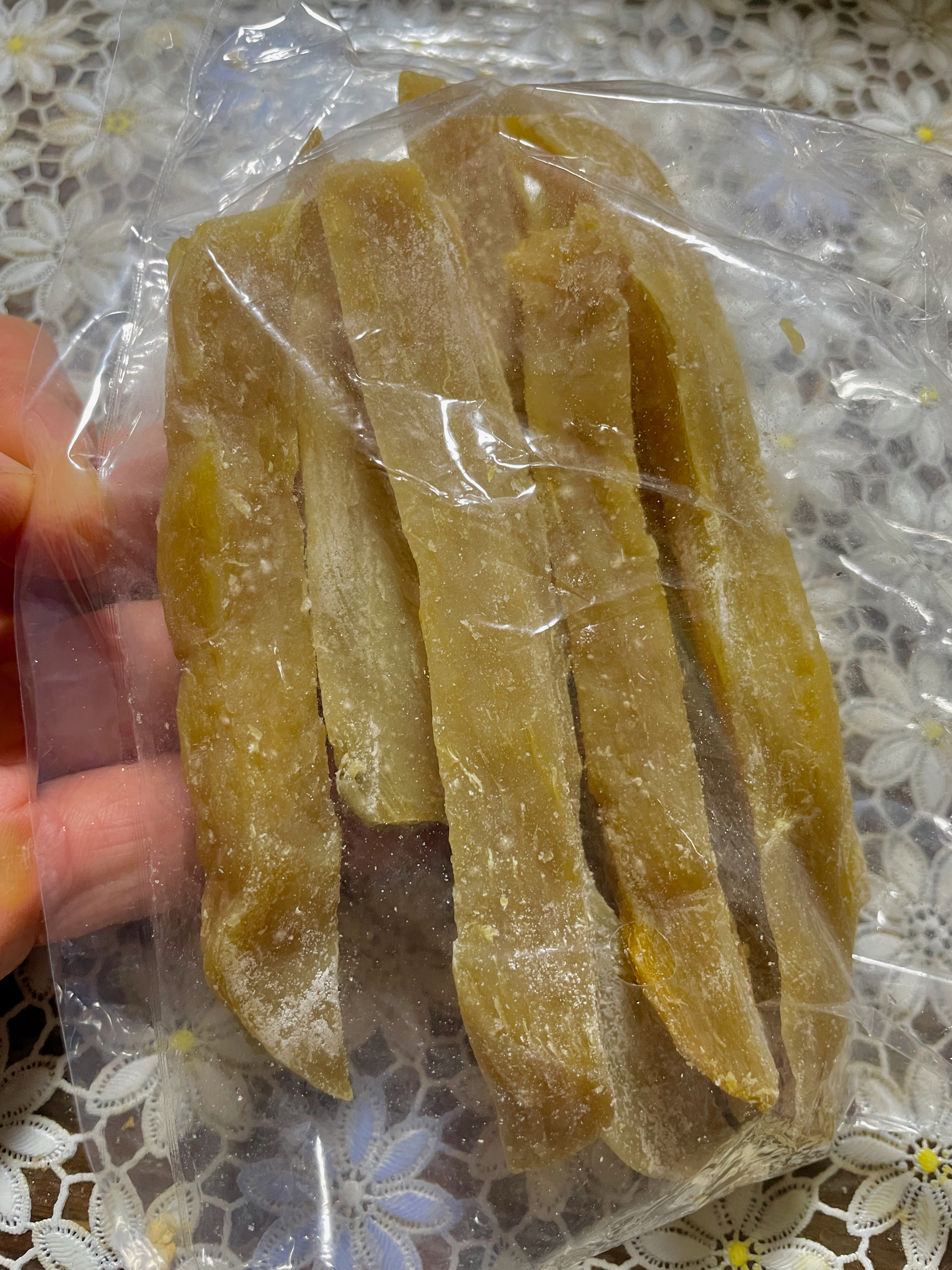
Bag of hoshi-imo

In Japan, hoshi-imo is available in many shapes, ranging from French fry-like rods to broad, flat chunks roughly 10–15 cm in length and 5 cm in width. Sometimes oblong, unsliced varieties, known as maru-boshi (丸干し) are also marketed.

Many types of sweet potato (Ipomoea batatas) are used to make this product. Common varieties include Beniharu (紅はる), Tamayutaka (玉豊), Silk Sweet (シルクスイート), and Anno-Mitsuki (安納蜜嬉) sweet potatoes. Since China produces more sweet potatoes than Japan, and the price of sweet potatoes in China is generally lower than in Japan, much of the hoshi-imo sold in Japan today is, in fact, produced in China.

== History ==
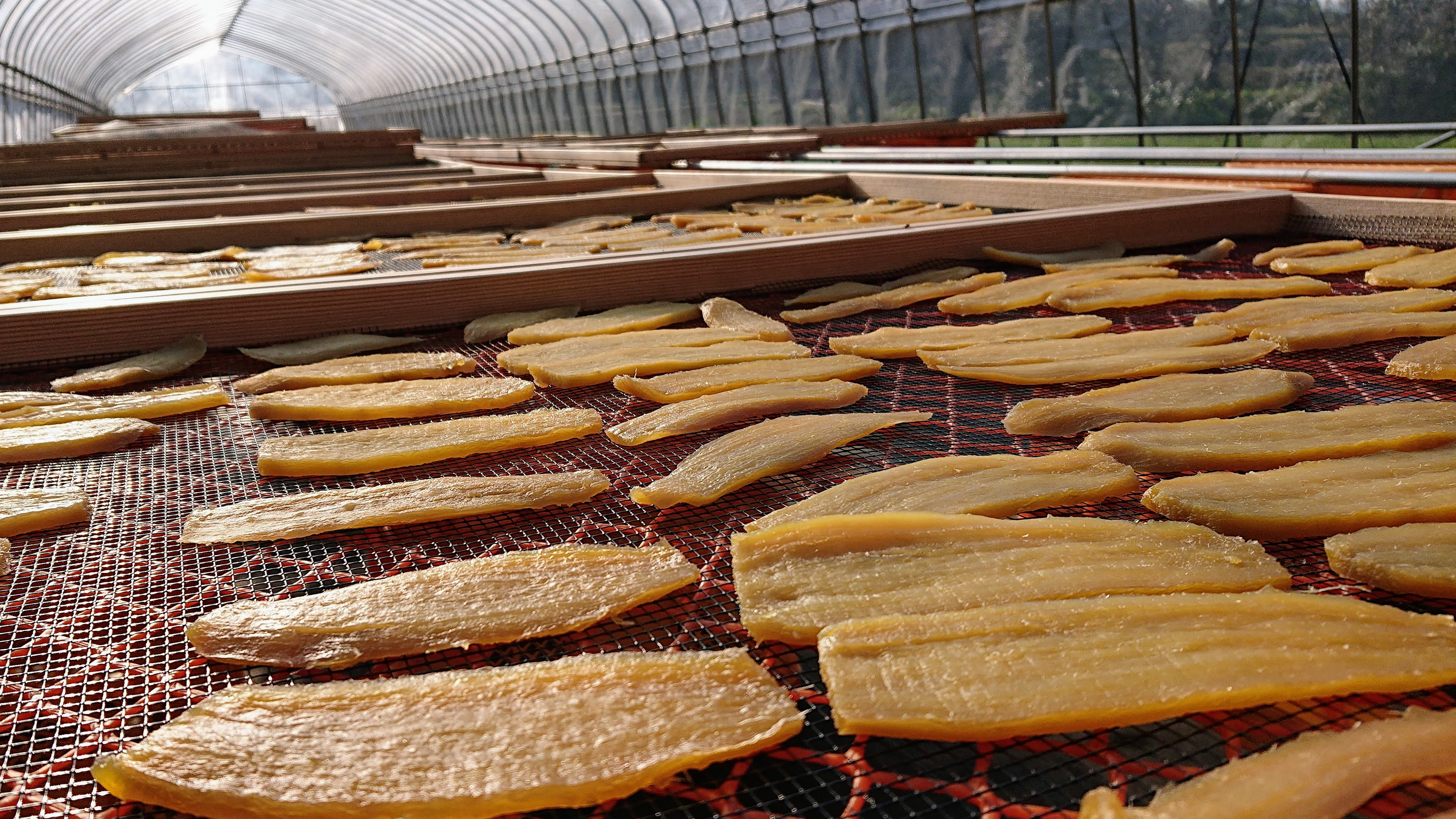
Hoshi-imo drying in Ibaraki Prefecture

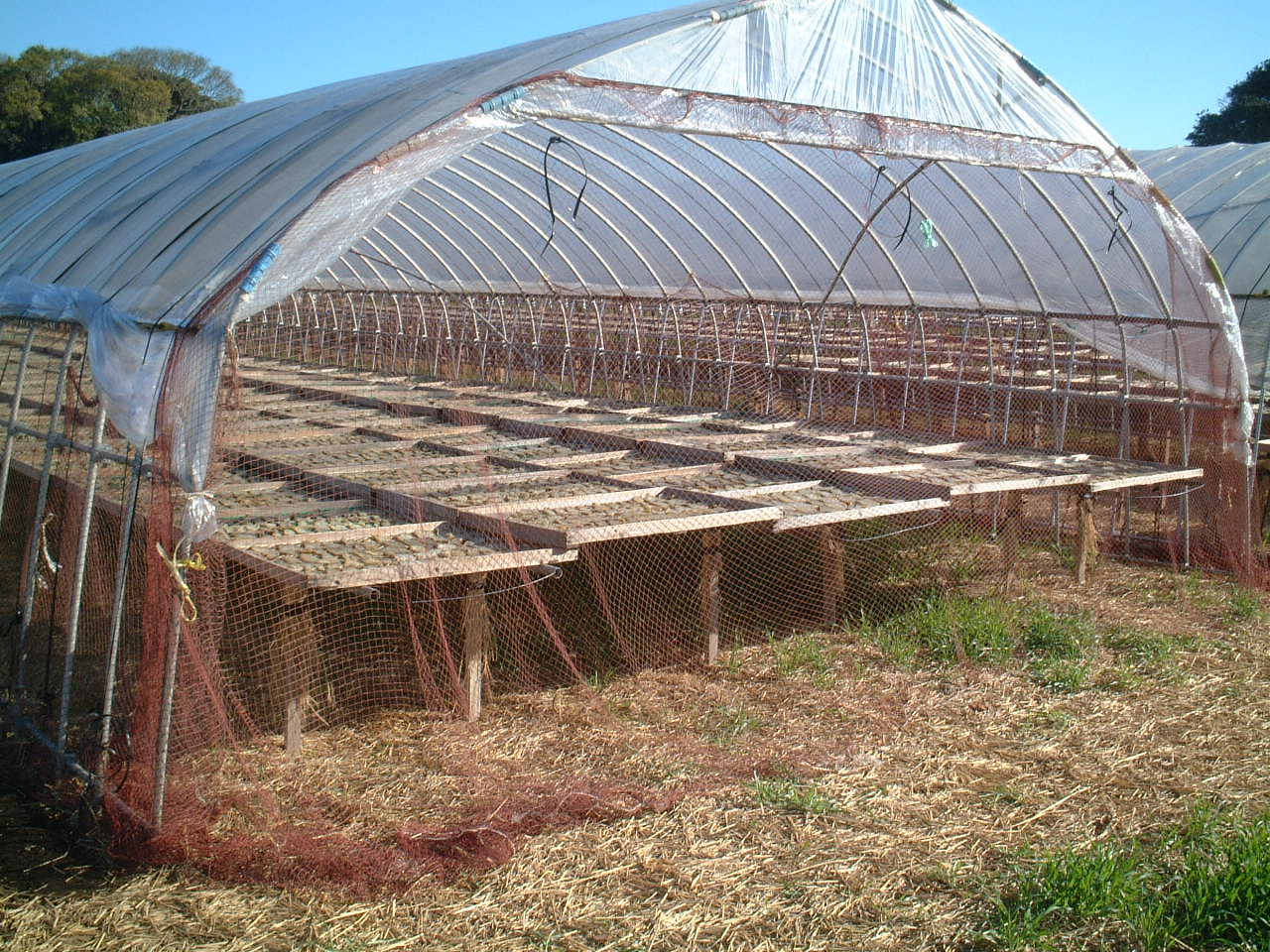
Drying tent

The snack supposedly originated in Omaezaki City in what today is Shizuoka Prefecture. Around 1824 a merchant named Shozo Kuribayashi began in manufacturing this dish on a small scale. In 1892, Rinzo Ohniwa and Jinhichi Inagaki of modified the manufacturing process to facilitate industrial production. Soon this product spread throughout Japan as a popular type of preserved food. It was also used during the Russo-Japanese War, briefly gaining the sobriquet as "soldier's potatoes." In 1908 large scale production began in Ibaraki prefecture. Two theories exist about how this product was introduced to Ibaraki prefecture. One theory holds that a rice cracker maker named Toshichi Yuasa hired a technician who modified his dried seafood processing facility to produce this agricultural product. Another theory holds that Seiji Koike and Jizan Ouchi got the backing of the governor of Ibaraki Prefecture, Masataka Mori, to start up local production with the aid of two technicians from Shizuoka.

Both public and private sectors in Ibaraki Prefecture have promoted steamed dried sweet potatoes extensively. In 2019 the Hitachinaka Chamber of Commerce and Industry was selected by the Japan Chamber of Commerce and Industry as the winner of a commerce prize for its "Dried Sweet Potato Attraction Project" that included the development of hoshiimo cakes and a book outlining the history of dried sweet potatoes. Today over 80% of the steamed dried sweet potatoes sold in Japan are from Ibaraki prefecture.

== Nutrition ==
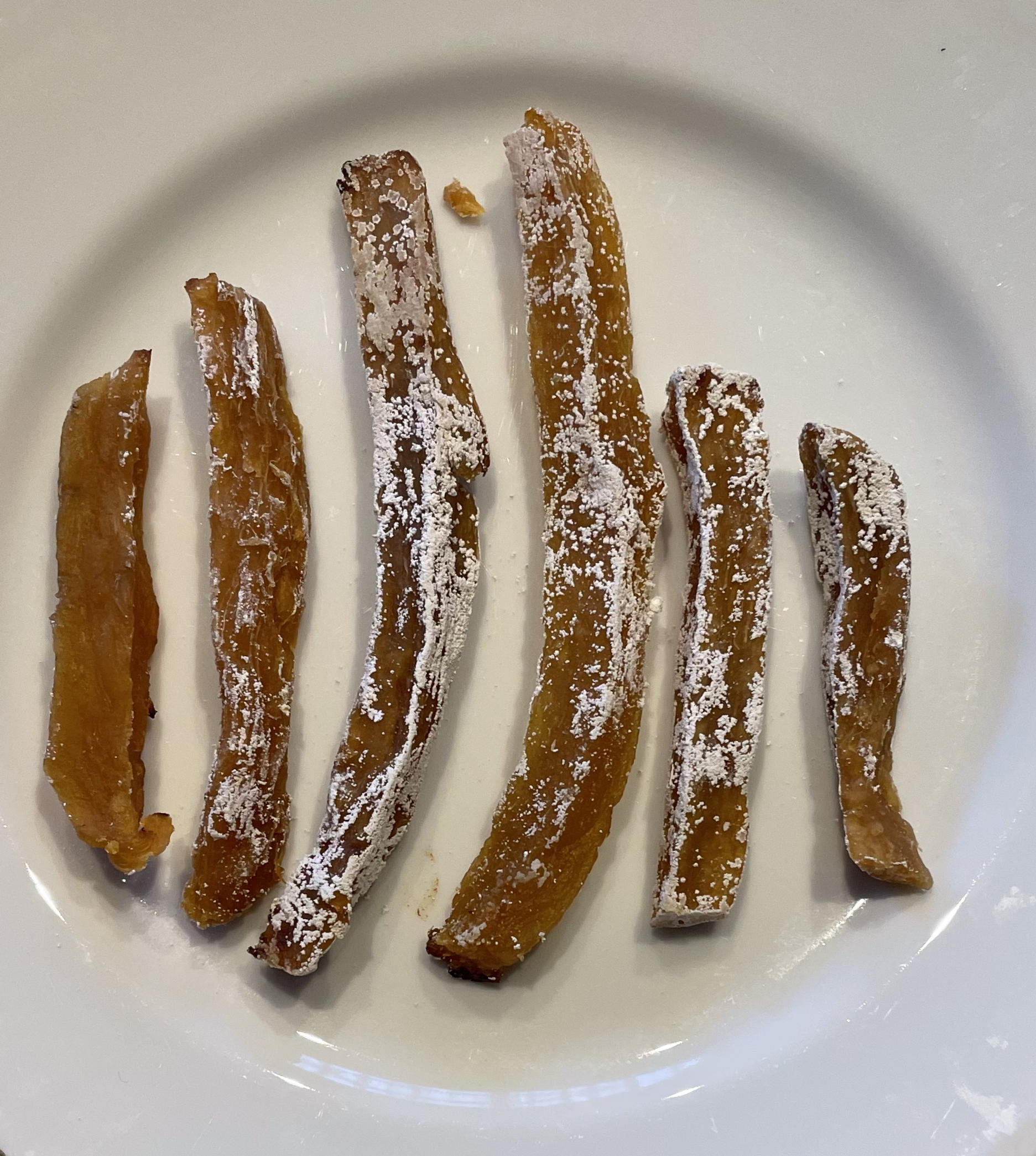
Dried strips with crystallized sugar on the surface

Hoshi-imo is particularly rich in vitamins A, B_{1}, C, and E and contains much potassium and calcium as well as dietary fiber.

== Similar dishes ==
It is similar to two Korean dishes: "goguma-malaengi" (고구마말랭이) and "mallingoguma" (말린고구마). The latter is cut into thinner slices and has a crisper texture than the former. In China, a snack very similar to hoshi-imo known as "dìguā gàn" (地瓜干) is popular and in Vietnam a product known as "khoai lang sấy dẻo" is common.

== See also ==
- List of sweet potato dishes
