= Gane (Kyushu food) =

Japanese sweet potato dish

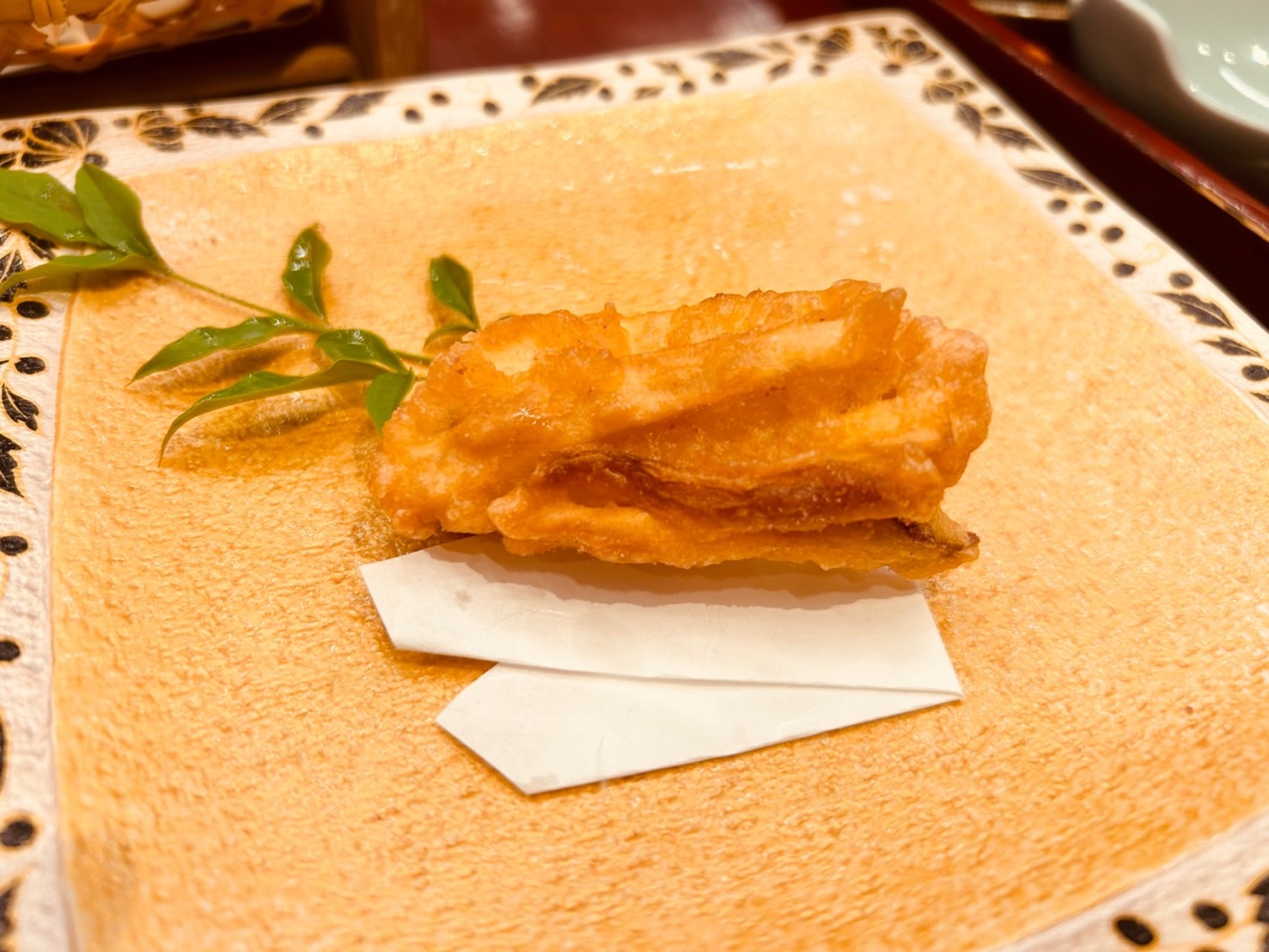
Gane

Gane (がね) is a traditional sweet potato dish eaten in the Kyushu region of Japan, particularly in Kagoshima and Kumamoto.

== Overview ==
Gane (がね) is a traditional regional dish from Kyushu, particularly in Kagoshima and surrounding areas, made primarily with sweet potatoes, a specialty crop of the region. It consists of thickly julienned sweet potatoes and other vegetables coated in batter and deep-fried. The name gane comes from the Kagoshima dialect word for "crab," as the shape of the dish resembles crab legs. It is typically seasoned with a generous amount of sugar, giving it a distinctive sweetness. The specific vegetables used and the composition of the batter vary by region and household.

In some areas, buckwheat flour is used in the batter, and brown sugar may be added for sweetness. The dish is eaten year-round in Kyushu and is enjoyed as a side dish, snack with tea, children's treat, or accompaniment to alcoholic drinks. It also appears during seasonal events and ceremonial occasions, such as New Year's celebrations and funerals.

Kagoshima, which has the highest sweet potato production in Japan, offers an ideal climate for cultivation. Although it has a warm environment, much of the land consists of porous volcanic soil from the Shirasu Plateau, which drains quickly. Additionally, the frequent typhoons pose a challenge to agriculture. Sweet potatoes, which grow underground and tolerate poor soil, became deeply rooted in the region's agricultural practices for their resilience and adaptability.

=== History ===
One theory traces the introduction of sweet potatoes to 1698, when Tanegashima Hisamoto (種子島久基), the lord of Tanegashima Island, sent an emissary to the Ryukyu Kingdom and brought them back. In 1705, Maeda Riemon (前田利右衛門), a sailor from Yamakawa, is said to have cultivated sweet potatoes in his field and distributed them to neighbors, leading to their spread throughout Kagoshima. However, this origin story remains uncertain.

Due to their high yield and suitability as a staple for the poor, sweet potatoes were once called "kōkō-imo" (孝行芋, "filial piety potatoes"). They also became closely associated with other Kagoshima specialties—Kurobuta pork, for example, is raised on feed that includes sweet potatoes, and Imo Shochu (芋焼酎), a distilled spirit made from sweet potatoes, is another iconic product of the region. It can be said that sweet potatoes are central to Kagoshima's culinary culture, and Gane is one of many traditional dishes that reflect this connection.
