= Soetpatats =

Sweet potato dish

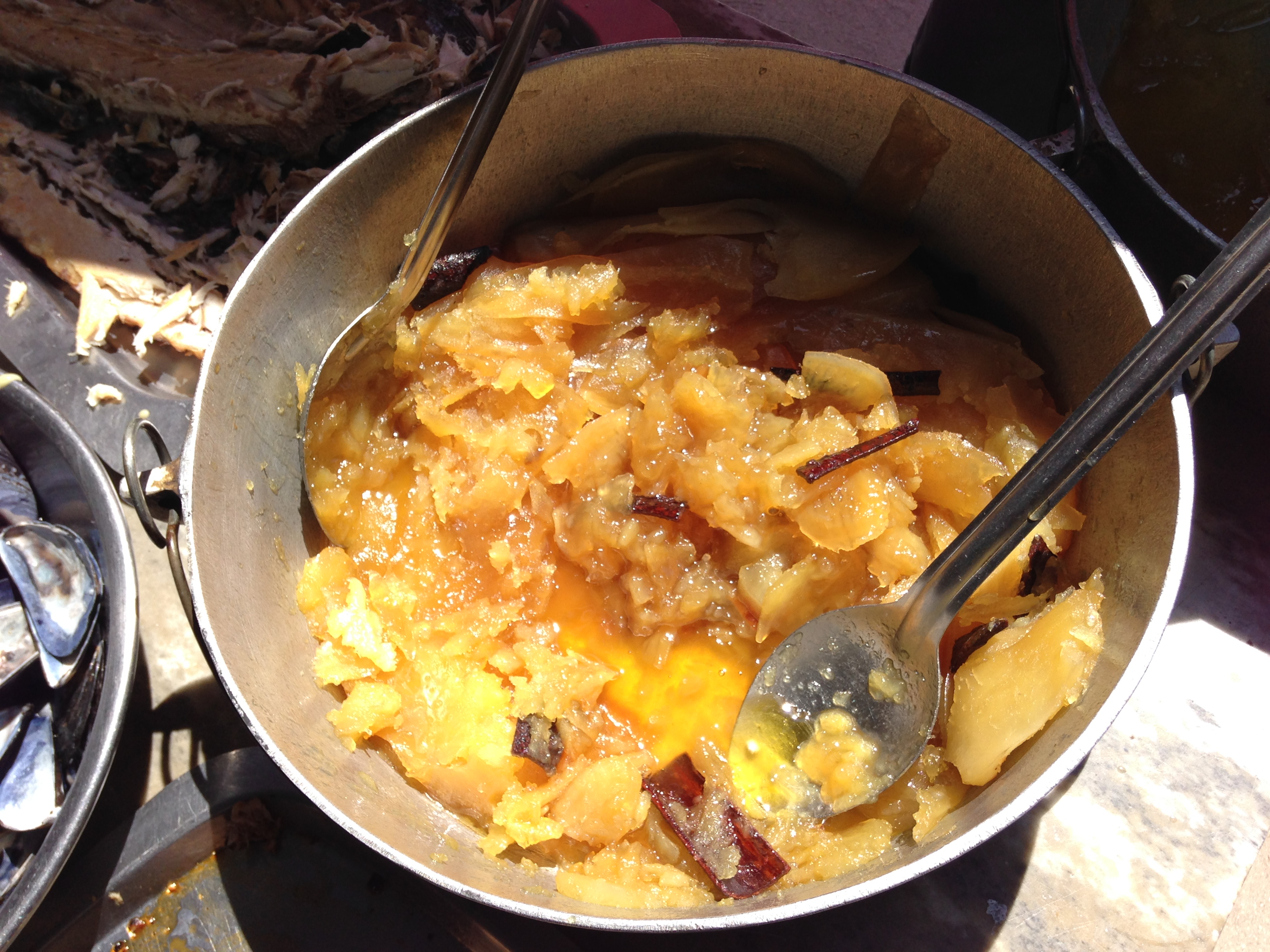
- Soetpatats being served as a side dish at a fish braai.
- Alternative names: Soet Karamel Patats (Caramelised Sweet Potatoes)
- Course: main
- Place of origin: South Africa
- Region or state: Western Cape
- Created by: unknown
- Main ingredients: sweet potato, butter, brown sugar, cinnamon
- Variations: Multiple

Soetpatats, also known as soet karamel patats (translated into English as "caramelised sweet potatoes"), is a sweet potato dish often baked in a dutch oven with butter, brown sugar, cinnamon, and in some recipes lemon juice. It is an Afrikaans dish and originates from South Africa. It is commonly served as a side dish at braais (barbecues), often served alongside snoek (Thyrsites). The dish was one of many Afrikaner foods recorded by Afrikaans poet C. Louis Leipoldt, and was noted by him as being one of his favourites.

== See also ==
- List of sweet potato dishes
