= Sweet potato salad =

Arab salad

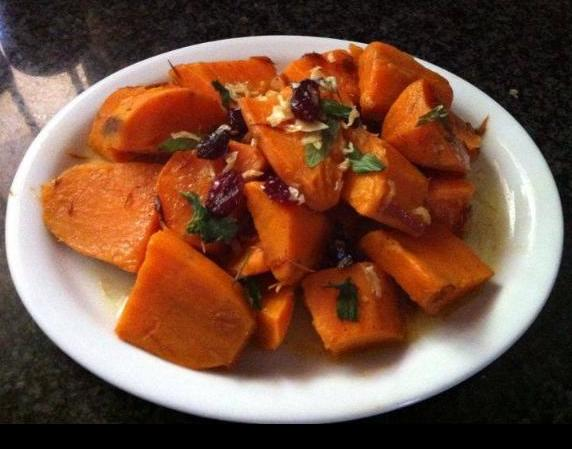
- Alternative names: سلطة البطاطا الحلوة
- Type: Salad
- Place of origin: Maghreb
- Region or state: Arab world

Sweet potato salad (Arabic: سلطة البطاطا الحلوة) is an Arab salad, made typically of sweet potato, onion, olive oil, mashed garlic, salt, ground pepper, grated ginger, black pepper, cinnamon sticks, raisins, coriander, ground sugar, and water. It is very popular in the Arab world, especially in the Maghreb as well in the Levant, specifically in Lebanon.

== See also ==
- List of Arab salads
- List of sweet potato dishes
