= Dulce de batata =

Sweet potato jelly

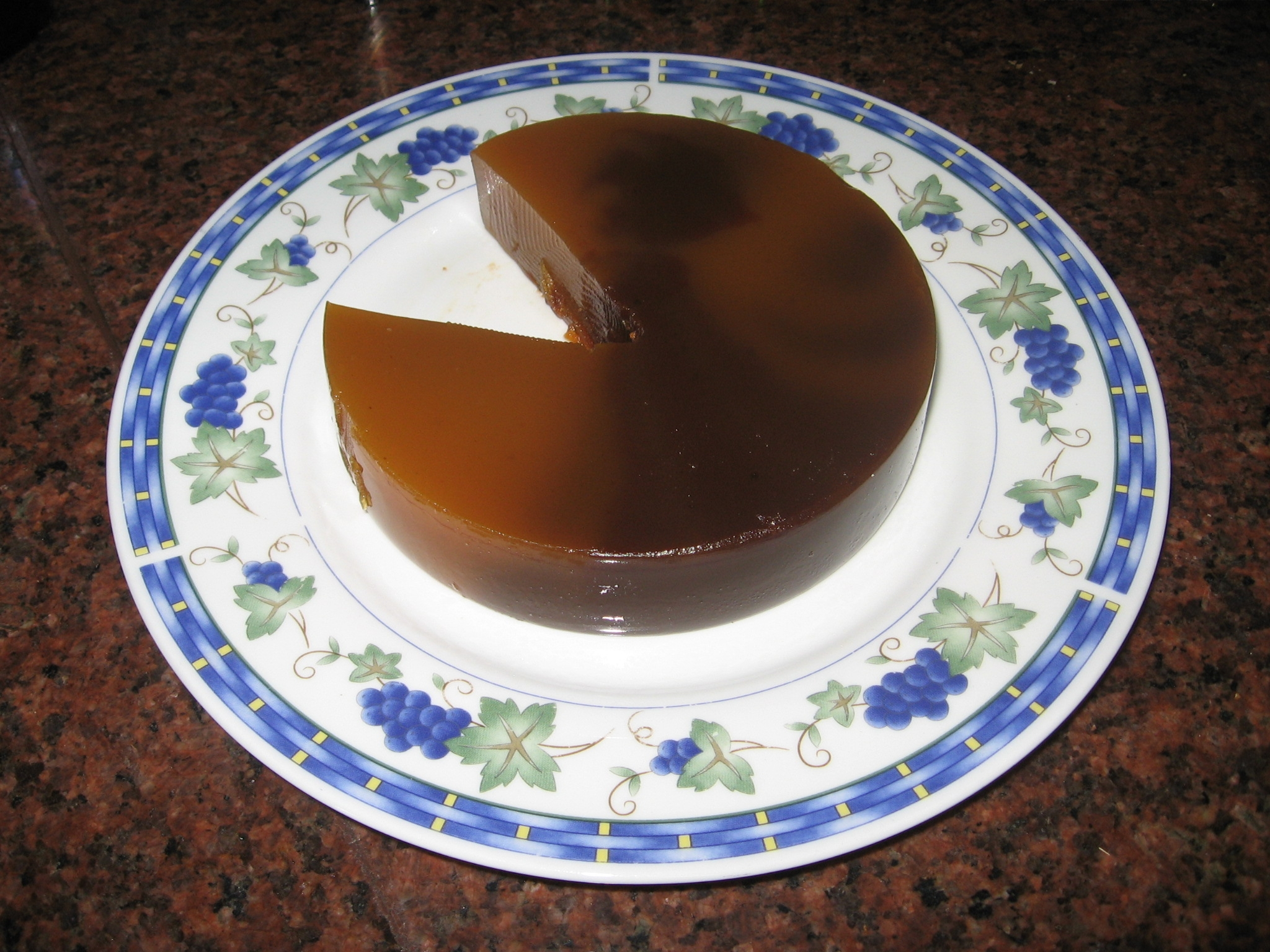
- Dulce de batata with chocolate, from a can
- Type: Dessert
- Main ingredients: Sweet potatoes

Dulce de batata (Spanish: sweet potato candy) is a traditional South American jellied dessert. Depending on the locality, it is known by a variety of names, including dulce de boniatos and, in Brazil, marrom glacê (Portuguese: candied chestnut) or doce de batata doce. Dulce de batata is consumed across many nations of the Southern Cone; it can be served plain, eaten with cheese, or combined with less traditional ingredients such as chocolate.

== History ==
Although multiple countries claim to be the origin of dulce de batatas, it is known throughout the Río de la Plata region in the countries of Argentina, Brazil, Paraguay and Uruguay.

It is commonly eaten with cheese. The traditional combination of cheese and jellied fruit (either quince or sweet potato) is known as "postre vigilante," so named because it was popularly eaten during the 1920s as a quick, inexpensive, and practical dessert by police officers in Palermo, Buenos Aires.

The Brazilian version, marrom glacê, shares its name with the candied chestnut dish of marron glacé, except with sweet potato substituted for the chestnuts, resulting in a sweeter, more regional dish.

== Preparation ==
While the traditional method of preparation is to slow-cook sweet potatoes with sugar, then use gelatin to mold it into a jelly, optional ingredients such as vanilla, chocolate, and cherries are commonly added as well. An Argentine recipe from 1924 suggests preparing a hot sugar syrup, adding orange peel, and to add the sweet potatoes last. A roughly contemporary recipe from Uruguay suggests that the sweet potatoes should be washed and then soaked for one hour in limewater before being slowly cooked, rested until the next day, and finished cooking with orange peel or cinnamon for flavor.

It is commonly served with cheese and nuts after dinner, or between meals as a snack.

== See also ==
- Candied sweet potatoes
- List of desserts
- List of sweet potato dishes
