= Camote cue =

Popular snack food in the Philippines

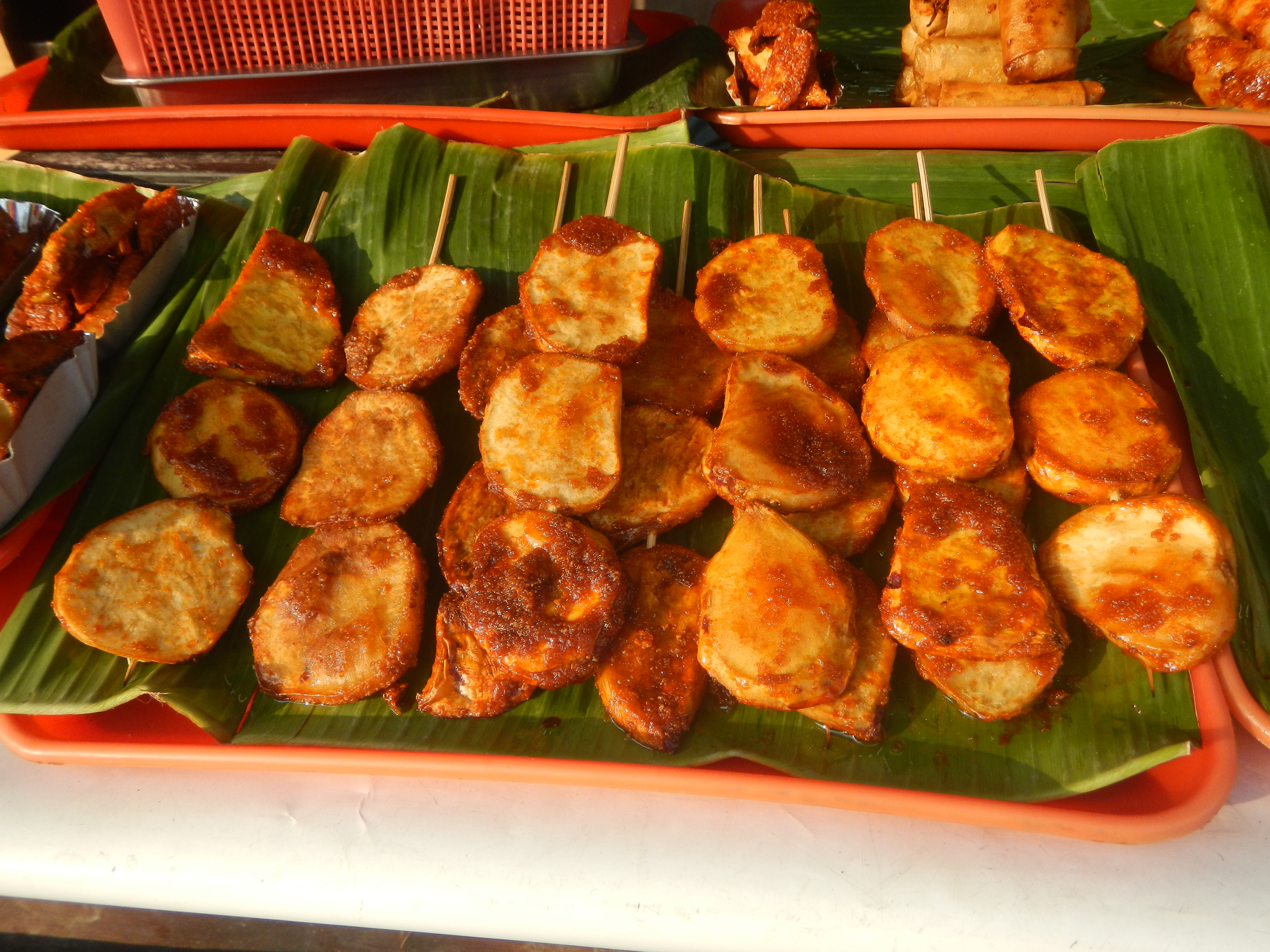
- Alternative names: Camotecue, kamote cue, camote fritters
- Region or state: Philippines
- Main ingredients: Sweet potato, brown sugar, cooking oil

Camote cue or camotecue is a popular snack food in the Philippines made from camote (sweet potato).

Slices of camote are coated with brown sugar and then fried, to cook the potatoes and to caramelize the sugar. It is one of the most common street foods in the Philippines, along with bananacue and turon.

The term is a portmanteau of "camote" and "barbecue"; the latter in Philippine English refers to meat cooked in a style similar to kebabs.

Though served skewered on bamboo sticks, it is not cooked on the stick. The skewer is purely for easier handling as it is usually sold as street food.

== See also ==
- Ginanggang
- List of sweet potato dishes
- Maruya
