= Imo Shochu =

Japanese spirit made from sweet potatoes

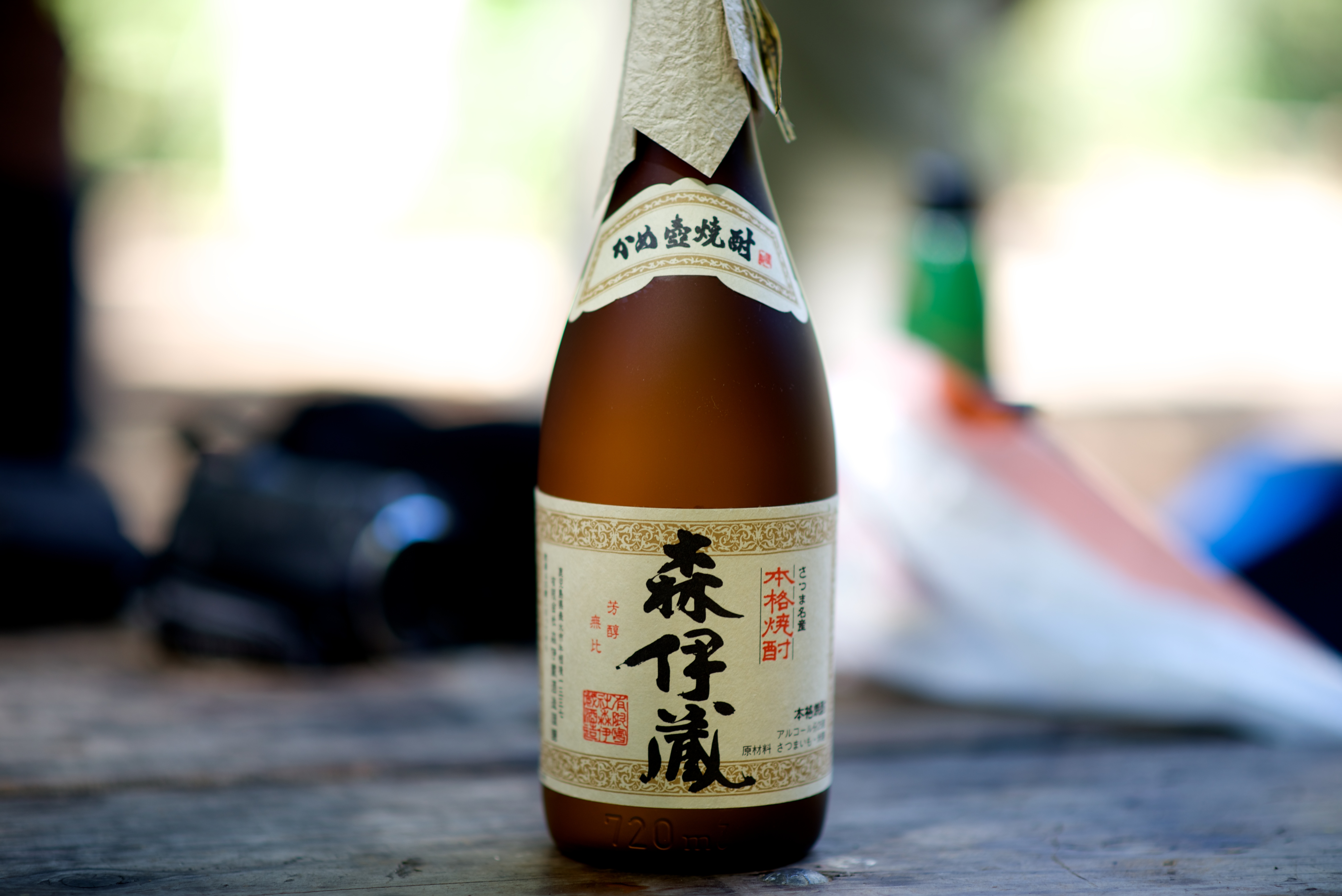
Imo Shochu (Moriizo)

Imo Shochu (芋焼酎) is a type of Japanese distilled spirit (Shōchū) made primarily from sweet potatoes, commonly produced and consumed in the Kyushu. It is also known as Kansho Shochu (甘藷焼酎).

== Overview ==
Imo Shochu (芋焼酎) is a distilled spirit made from sweet potatoes, primarily produced in the plains of Kagoshima and Miyazaki in Kyushu. It is one of the most widely consumed distilled liquors in the region. A spirit based on sweet potatoes is globally rare, making Imo Shochu particularly distinctive.

Sweet potatoes contain less starch and more moisture than grains, which makes them unsuitable for long-term storage and, by extension, less ideal as a fermentation substrate. As a result, although sweet potatoes are widely cultivated around the world, they are used as a base for alcohol production almost exclusively in shochu.

The quality of Imo Shochu depends heavily on the freshness and careful selection of raw materials. This is why most production is concentrated in the southern part of Miyazaki and in Kagoshima, the leading sweet potato-producing regions. Other production areas include Hachijō-jima, where the characteristic aroma and soft sweetness of sweet potatoes are also appreciated.

The most commonly used sweet potato variety is Kogane Sengan (黄金千貫), known for its suitability in shochu production.

Shochu made from potatoes such as regular white potatoes is referred to separately as Jagaimo Shochu (ジャガイモ焼酎) to distinguish it from Imo Shochu.

== Characteristics ==
The distinctive aroma of Imo Shochu (芋焼酎) is considered both a strength and a potential barrier, as it tends to divide preferences. The aroma is composed of several key compounds:

- Monoterpene alcohols: the primary aroma component, reminiscent of muscat or lychee
- α-Terpineol (α-テルピネオール): similar to the scent of lilac
- β-Damascenone (β-ダマセノン): a sweet, fruity note
- Guaiacol (グアイアコール): a phenolic compound with a disinfectant-like smell
- Farnesol (ファルネソール): citrus-like fragrance

Among these, α-terpineol and guaiacol are particularly unique to Imo Shochu and are not commonly found in other types of shochu. The monoterpene alcohols are formed when monoterpene glycosides, which are highly concentrated in the skin and ends of sweet potatoes, are broken down by enzymes during fermentation.

The strength and character of the aroma can vary depending on how the sweet potatoes are processed and on the activity of enzymes during fermentation. Notably, black kōji mold (黒麹菌) has a higher enzymatic activity in this context than white kōji mold (白麹菌), leading to stronger aromatic development.

Other compounds responsible for aroma are not derived from the sweet potatoes themselves but are secondary byproducts formed when the mash is heated during atmospheric distillation.

== Consumption ==
In fiscal year 2017, the taxable shipment volume of Imo Shochu (芋焼酎) in Kyushu reached 202,337 kiloliters, accounting for 53.4% of all single-distillation shochu in the region, making it the most widely consumed type. By prefecture, Miyazaki led with 117,367 kiloliters (58%), followed by Kagoshima with 80,994 kiloliters (40%), meaning these two prefectures accounted for 98% of Kyushu’s total.

Although kokutō shochu (黒糖焼酎) is produced in the Amami Islands, the rest of Kagoshima mainly produces Imo Shochu, which is registered under the geographical indication Satsuma Shochu (薩摩焼酎). Two notable traditional master brewer lineages (tōji) include the Kurose Tōji (黒瀬杜氏) from former Kasasa Town and the Ata Tōji (阿多杜氏) from former Kinpō Town. These brewers were traditionally active during the agricultural off-season from August to February, primarily in Kagoshima and Miyazaki, crafting Imo Shochu and grain-based shochu.

Preferences for alcohol content vary by region: in Kagoshima and nearby cities like Kushima and Ebino, 25% ABV Imo Shochu is favored, whereas in Miyakonojo and central Miyazaki, 20% ABV varieties are more common. The former is typically consumed with water or hot water, while the latter is often enjoyed on the rocks. When served warm, the aroma and sweetness of Imo Shochu become especially pronounced. In both Kagoshima and Miyazaki, it is also customary for the loser in a game of nanko (なんこ) to drink, reflecting local drinking culture.

According to a 2004 report on shochu consumption in Miyazaki, the Imo Shochu brand Kirishima (霧島) from Kirishima Shuzo (霧島酒造) held a dominant 62.7% share of the entire prefecture's authentic (otsurui) shochu market. However, many other brands maintain strong local followings in areas near their headquarters: Matsu no Kiri (松の霧) from Matsu no Tsuyu Shuzō (松の露酒造) has a 76% share in Nichinan, Obisugi (飫肥杉) from Inoue Shuzō (井上酒造) holds 90% in Nangō, Meigetsu (明月) from Akashi Shuzō (明石酒造) claims 78% in Ebino, and Shōro (松露) from Shōro Shuzō (松露酒造) has 50% in Kushima.

In some areas, other types of shochu also dominate: for example, Kuma Shochu (球磨焼酎) holds over 70% of the market in Nishimera, while soba shochu (蕎麦焼酎) has a similar share in towns like Gokase and Aya.

== Characteristics and Processing of Raw Materials ==
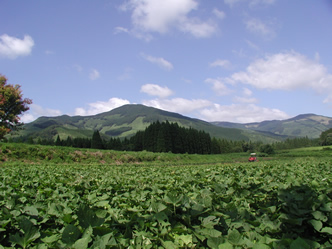
Kirishima

=== Sweet Potatoes ===
In 2017, Japan produced 807,100 tons of sweet potatoes, approximately 200,000 tons (about 25%) of which were used as raw material for Imo Shochu (芋焼酎). In Miyazaki, 56,000 tons (66% of the local harvest), and in Kagoshima, 143,000 tons (48%) were allocated to shochu production.

The flesh color of the sweet potato influences the flavor and aroma profile of the resulting shochu:

- Yellow-white varieties: Includes Kogane Sengan (黄金千貫), the most widely used type, known for its richness and sweetness.
- White varieties: Such as Joy White (ジョイホワイト), which lacks β-amylase and is less prone to saccharification, resulting in a clean, floral, citrusy aroma due to linalool.
- Purple varieties: Such as Ayamurasaki (アヤムラサキ), known for diacetyl-derived notes reminiscent of red wine or yogurt.
- Orange varieties: Such as Benihayato (ベニハヤト), with β-ionone aromas like papaya or cooked carrots.

Historically, Genji (源氏) was common in the Meiji era, and Norin No.2 (農林2号) after WWII. Since the mid-1980s, Kogane Sengan became the dominant variety due to its flavor and sweetness. Later, to improve storage properties and pest resistance, and to diversify shochu characteristics, new varieties were developed, such as Joy White, Tokimasari (ときまさり), Murasaki Akari (ムラサキアカリ), and Suzukogane (スズコガネ). Currently, Koganemasari (コガネマサリ) is spreading in Miyazaki and Satsumamasari (サツママサリ) in Kagoshima.

Processing begins with mechanical washing, cutting off both ends, and removing diseased sections. Peeling may be done to adjust aroma. Large potatoes are cut for even heating. They are steamed for 60 minutes using steam kettles, which gelatinizes starch and kills surface microbes. Insufficient steaming results in a raw potato smell in the final product. After steaming, potatoes are cooled by forced air and crushed. Coarseness is adjusted by β-amylase content: coarse (~1 cm) for high-enzyme varieties, finer for others.

=== Rice ===
For cost efficiency, inexpensive rice types have traditionally been used for kōji production. Crushed imported rice was common until 1971, after which aged rice (kokokumai) was used. Since 1985, alternative-use rice and broken indica rice from Thailand have been adopted, especially after the 1993 domestic rice shortage.

Crushed rice is highly absorbent and requires short soaking times. Indica rice, which absorbs poorly, may undergo double steaming. Both are adjusted to reach 36–37% moisture. In standard Imo Shochu, rice kōji makes up about one-sixth of the ingredients by weight but contributes roughly 40% of the starch, heavily influencing aroma and flavor.

=== Kōji Mold and Yeast ===
White kōji mold (白麹菌) is most commonly used, with black kōji mold (黒麹菌) and yellow kōji mold (黄麹菌) used to add distinctive character. Both white and black kōji molds produce citric acid, which inhibits spoilage and supports enzyme activity in acidic conditions. Since sweet potatoes are steamed prior to fermentation, the required saccharification capacity is less than for barley or rice shochu. However, kōji is essential for providing amino acids, vitamins, and enzymes that drive fermentation and flavor development.

Given the high temperatures typical of production areas such as Miyazaki and Kagoshima, yeast strains must be heat-tolerant and acid-resistant. Common strains include Kagoshima Yeast (鹿児島酵母), developed by the Kagoshima Shochu Makers Association, and Miyazaki Yeast (宮崎酵母), developed by the Miyazaki Prefectural Food Research Center. Each includes several subtypes tailored to regional needs.
