= Sweet potato pie =

Traditional dessert in the southern United States

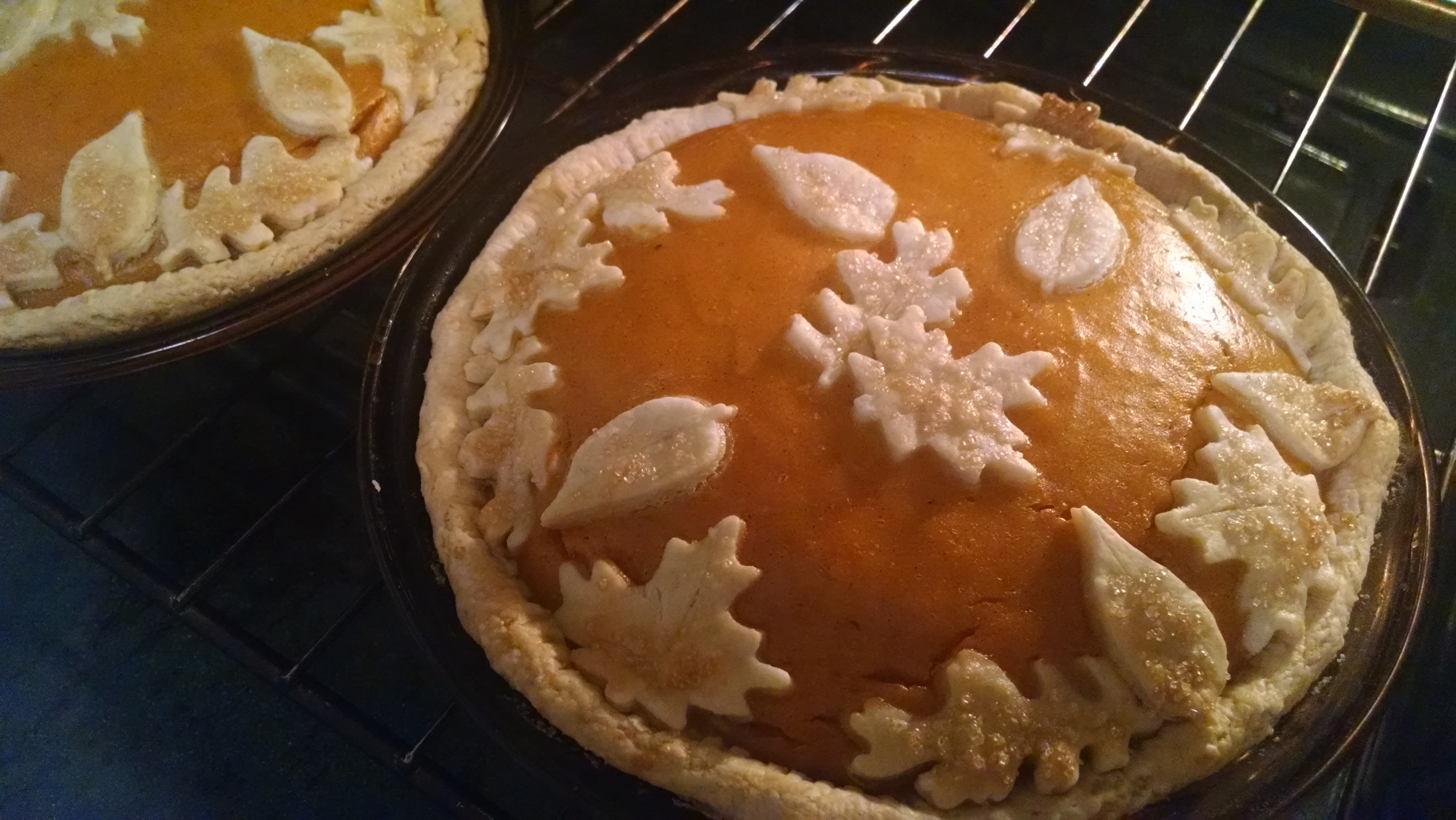
- Sweet potato pies with decorative tops
- Type: Pie
- Course: Dessert
- Place of origin: United States
- Region or state: Southern United States
- Main ingredients: Pie shell, sweet potatoes, milk, sugar, eggs, spices

Sweet potato pie is a traditional dessert pie originating in the Southern United States. It is often served during the American holiday season, especially at Thanksgiving and Christmas, in place of pumpkin pie, which is more traditional in other regions of the United States.

It is made in an open pie shell without a top crust. The filling consists of mashed sweet potatoes, evaporated milk, eggs, sugar, and spices such as cinnamon, ginger, and nutmeg. The baked vegetal custard filling may vary from light and silky to dense, depending on the recipe's ratio of sweet potato, milk and eggs.

== History ==
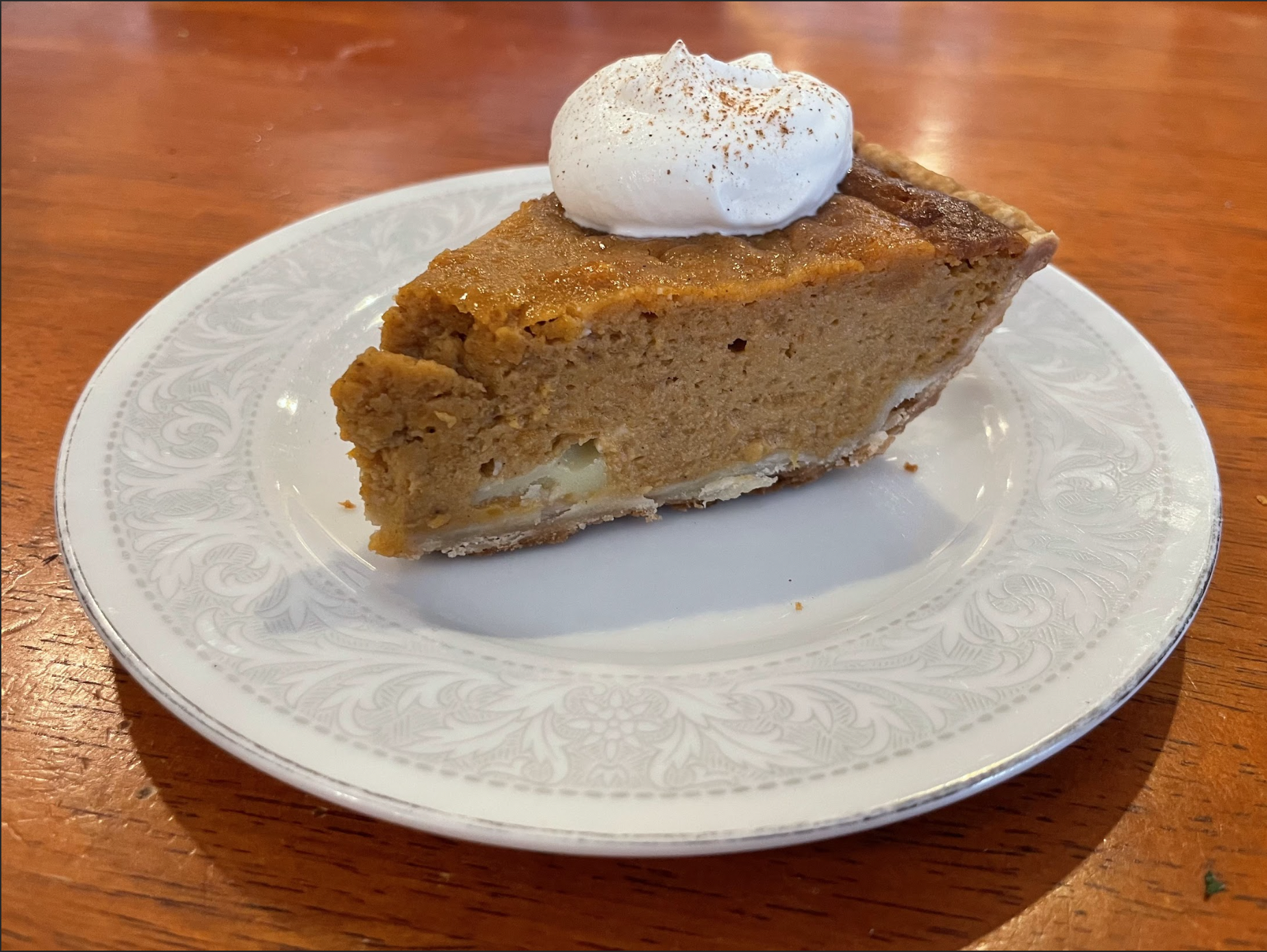
A slice of sweet potato pie with whipped cream

Though creamy vegetable pie recipes date back to Medieval Europe, sweet potato pie appears in the southern United States from the early colonial days. The use of sweet potatoes in Southern and African-American cuisine traces back to Native American cuisine. The sweet potato, which is native to the Americas, was likely used by enslaved Africans as an alternative to the yam found in their homeland. Sweet potato pie applies European pie making customs to the preparation of sweet potatoes. Recipes for sweet potato pie first appeared in printed cookbooks in the 18th century, where it was included with savory vegetable dishes. By the 19th century, sweet potato pie was more commonly classified as a dessert. American Heritage (magazine) declared sweet potato pie the nation's "most underrated pie" elaborating, "That something as lowly and simple as this native plant could be transformed into such a glorious feast is a perfect characterization of the American ideal."

One variation is the Hawaiian sweet potato haupia pie.

== See also ==
- List of custard desserts
- Pie in American cuisine
- List of pies, tarts and flans
- List of sweet potato dishes
- List of regional dishes of the United States
