= Craddock (surname) =

Origin
- Meaning: amiable from Caratacus, who led a Welsh revolt against the Romans in 51
- Region of origin: Britain

Other names
- Variant forms: Cradock, Cradocke, Cradduck, Cradok, Craddoe, Caradog

Craddock is a surname of Welsh origin (the name Caradog means "beloved, amiable"). Notable people with the surname include:

- Bantz J. Craddock, U.S. general
- Barbara Craddock, U.S. dancer and choreographer
- Billy "Crash" Craddock, U.S. country singer
- Brad Craddock, American footballer
- Charles Egbert Craddock, pen name of Mary N. Murfree (1850–1922), a U.S. fiction writer
- Charlotte Craddock, English field hockey player
- Darren Craddock, English footballer
- DeWayne Craddock, perpetrator of the 2019 Virginia Beach shooting
- Fred Craddock, Christian minister
- Harry Craddock, English bartender, author of The Savoy Cocktail Book
- Ian Craddock, British engineer
- Jody Craddock, English footballer
- John D. Craddock, U.S. Representative from Kentucky, USA
- Lawson Craddock, American cyclist
- Linda Craddock (born 1952), Canadian visual artist
- Matthew Craddock, first governor of the Massachusetts Bay Company
- Moe Craddock, instrumental in the incorporation of Glenn Heights, Texas
- Robert Craddock, American soccer player
- Tom Craddock, English footballer
- Vincent Eugene Craddock (1935–1971), better known as Gene Vincent, an American musician and member of the Rock and Roll and Rockabilly halls of fame
- William J. Craddock, U.S. author

== See also ==
- Caradec
- Cradock
- Craddock
