= Works of Fanny Cradock =

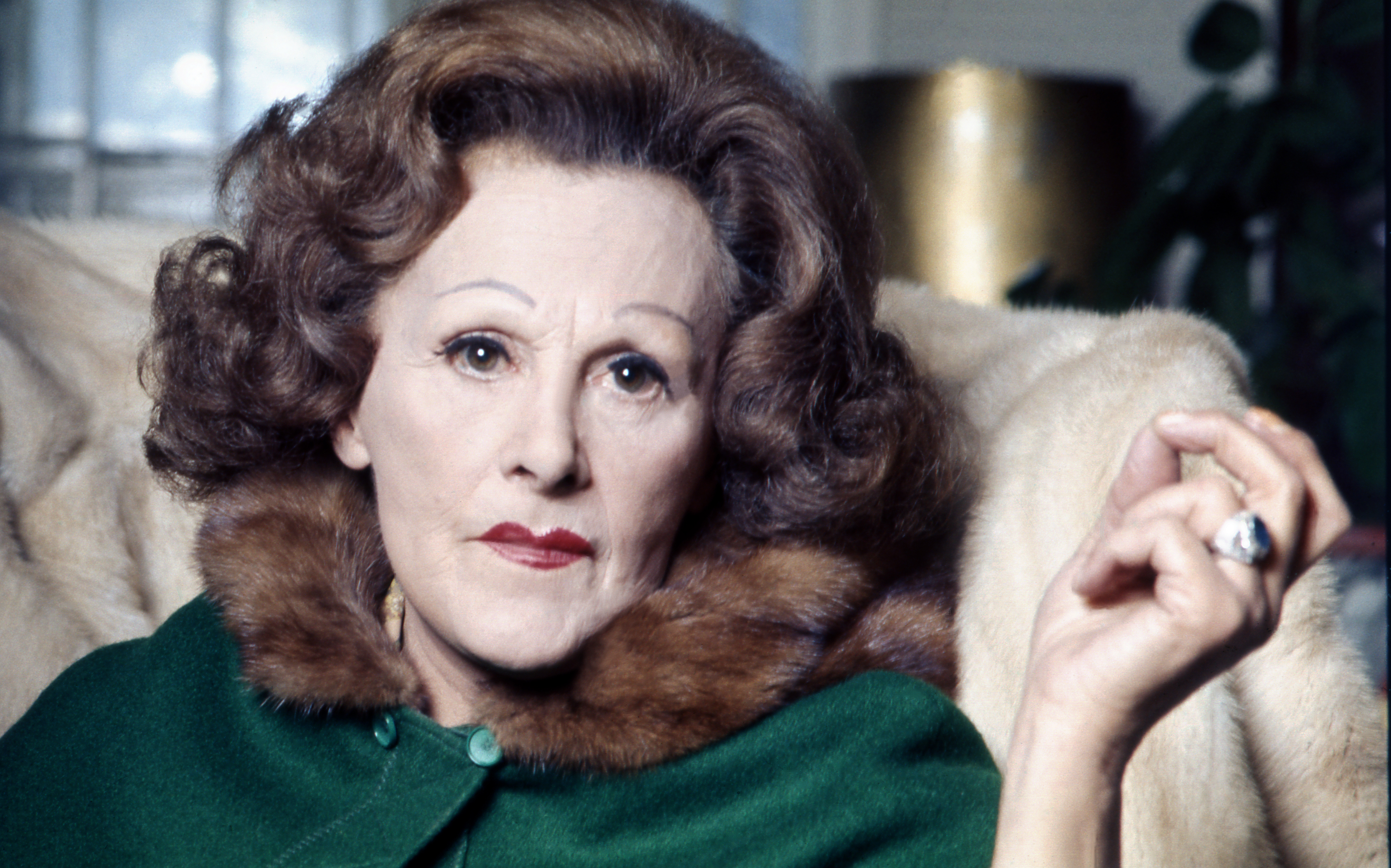
Cradock in 1976

Phyllis Nan Sortain "Primrose" Pechey (1909–1994), better known as Fanny Cradock, was an English writer, restaurant critic and television cook.

From 1942 Cradock, writing under the name Frances Dale, published a series of romantic novels; she also used the pseudonym as her by-line when she was the editor of the Sunday Graphic, a position she held for four years. In 1948 she, with her partner Major Johnnie Cradock, joined The Daily Telegraph, writing a food and drink column under the nom de plume "Bon Viveur". The columns were published in book form, and the Cradocks produced several works detailing travels around European eateries. From 1955 Cradock began appearing on television either on her own, or with Johnnie. According to her biographer Paul Levy, his character was portrayed as "the subservient sidekick, good only for handing Fanny her frying pan and knowing which wine to serve". According to Eddie Dyja, writing for the British Film Institute, Fanny's onscreen character was, "bossy, [with] no-nonsense delivery, and [an] unusual penchant for glamour".

From 1975 Cradock published a series of ten historical novels set at the fictional "Castle Rising". According to the author's foreword to The Lormes of Castle Rising (1975), when Cradock began writing the book in 1966, she was unaware of the existence of a real Castle Rising in Norfolk. The novels, while fiction, take some inspiration from Cradock's own genealogy; for example, the crest of the Lormes features the same astrolabe as the crest of her Norman ancestor Gilbert de Peche.

== Television work ==
Television appearances of Cradock
Programme	Date	Channel	Role	Notes	Ref.
Kitchen Magic	17 February 1955	BBC	Participant		
Television Tea Party	26 September 1955	BBC	Participant		
Fanny's Kitchen	5 October 1955 – 28 December 1956	ITV	Presenter	Series 1; 13 episodes	
The Cradocks Are Frying Tonight	4 November 1955	BBC	Presenter		
The Cradocks Are Frying Tonight	4 November 1955	BBC	Presenter	An evening dress version of the afternoon programme	
Challenge in the Kitchen	10 January 1956	BBC	Participant		
Chez Bon Viveur	30 April – 23 July 1956	ITV	Presenter	13 episodes	
Bon Viveur: Gala Christmas Dinner	11 December 1956	BBC	Presenter	Live broadcast from the Royal Albert Hall	
Fanny's Kitchen	10 January – 4 April 1957	ITV	Presenter	Series 2; 13 episodes	
Mainly for Women	11 September 1958	BBC	Participant		
Lucky Dip: The Junior Newspaper Series	10 February – 10 May 1959	ITV	Presenter	Series 1; 13 episodes	
The Cradocks	25 September – 18 December 1959	ITV	Presenter	Series 1	
Lucky Dip: The Junior Newspaper Series	5 January – 29 March 1960	ITV	Presenter	Series 2; 13 episodes	
Late Extra	13 April – 22 June 1960	ITV	Presenter	11 episodes	
Fanny's Kitchen	17 February 1961 – 12 May 1961	ITV	Presenter	Series 3; 13 episodes	
For Deaf Children	20 November 1961	BBC	Participant		
Fanny's Kitchen	22 February – 17 May 1962	ITV	Presenter	Series 4; 13 episodes	
Tuesday Rendezvous	10 April 1962, 28 August 1962 and 6 August 1963	ITV	Participant		
Home at One-Thirty	17 April 1962	BBC	Participant		
Home at One-Thirty	5 June 1962	BBC	Participant		
The Cradocks	25 September – 2 October 1962	ITV	Presenter	Series 2; 4 episodes	
Living Today	25 September 1962 – 7 May 1963	BBC	Participant	In 14 episodes	
Beginning to Cook	11 January – 15 February 1963	BBC	Presenter	6 episodes	
Kitchen Party	14 October – 25 November 1963	BBC	Presenter	6 episodes	
Learning to Cook	28 December 1963 – 18 January 1964	BBC	Presenter	6 episodes	
Home Cooking	25 April – 27 June 1965	BBC	Presenter	10 programmes	
Kitchen Party	4 – 18 August 1965	BBC	Presenter	3 programmes	
Adventurous Cooking with Fanny Cradock	17 April – 19 June 1966	BBC	Presenter	10 programmes	
Outlook for Tuesday: Home Cooking	26 July – 27 September 1966	BBC	Presenter	10 programmes	
Juke Box Jury	17 September 1966	BBC	Participant		
Christmas Cooking	1 – 15 December 1966	BBC	Presenter	3 programmes	
Problem Cooking	2 – 30 March 1967	BBC	Presenter	5 programmes	
Ten Classic Dishes	16 January – 19 March 1968	BBC	Presenter	10 programmes	
Fanny Cradock: Colourful Cookery	1 October – 31 December 1968	BBC	Presenter	13 episodes	
Giving A Dinner Party	4 July – 26 September 1969	BBC	Presenter	13 episodes	
Fanny Cradock Invites...	22 July – 14 October 1970	BBC	Presenter	13 episodes	
Score with the Scaffold	28 August 1970	BBC	Participant		
The Generation Game	30 October 1971	BBC	Participant		
Call My Bluff	17 and 24 January 1972	BBC	Participant	2 episodes	
Nationwide: Fanny Cradock Cooks Nationwide Into Europe	9 March – 31 May 1972	BBC	Participant	7 episodes	
Password	1 April and 20 August 1974	BBC	Participant	2 episodes	
Fanny Cradock Cooks for Christmas	15 – 19 December 1975	BBC	Presenter	5 episodes	
The Big Time "Gwen Troake's Banquet"	11 November 1976	BBC	Participant		
Pebble Mill at One	11 December 1981	BBC	Participant		
Windmill	29 December 1985	BBC	Participant		
The Last Resort with Jonathan Ross	3 April 1987	Channel 4	Participant		

== Novels ==
Publication	Writing as	Year	Publisher	Pages	OCLC
Scorpion's Suicide	Frances Dale	1942	Hurst and Blackett	232	OCLC 315897342
Women Must Wait	Frances Dale	1944	Hurst and Blackett	184	OCLC 558678454
The Rags of Time	Frances Dale	1944	Hurst and Blackett	180	OCLC 752521557
The Land is in Good Heart	Frances Dale	1945	Hurst and Blackett	180	OCLC 752521549
My Seed – Thy Harvest	Frances Dale	1946	Hurst and Blackett	271	OCLC 10420389
O Daughter of Babylon	Frances Dale	1947	Hurst and Blackett	320	OCLC 558678384
The Echo in the Cup	Frances Dale	1949	Hurst and Blackett	239	OCLC 843074279
Gateway to Remembrance	Phyllis Cradock	1949	Andrew Dakers	361	OCLC 37220320
The Eternal Echo	Phyllis Cradock	1950	Andrew Dakers	276	OCLC 560216248
The Shadow of Heaven	Frances Dale	1950	Hurst and Blackett	221	OCLC 752521561
The Dark Reflection	Frances Dale	1950	Hurst and Blackett	208	OCLC 752521525
The Lormes of Castle Rising	Fanny Cradock	1975	W. H. Allen & Co.	340	OCLC 1530007
Shadows Over Castle Rising	Fanny Cradock	1976	W. H. Allen & Co.	351	OCLC 2811552
War Comes to Castle Rising	Fanny Cradock	1977	W. H. Allen & Co.	337	OCLC 3914865
Wind of Change at Castle Rising	Fanny Cradock	1978	W. H. Allen & Co.	260	OCLC 4932043
Uneasy Peace at Castle Rising	Fanny Cradock	1979	W. H. Allen & Co.	228	OCLC 6568075
Thunder Over Castle Rising	Fanny Cradock	1980	W. H. Allen & Co.	227	OCLC 7782209
Gathering Clouds at Castle Rising	Fanny Cradock	1981	W. H. Allen & Co.	238	OCLC 8328514
Fateful Years at Castle Rising	Fanny Cradock	1982	W. H. Allen & Co.	288	OCLC 18205250
Defence of Castle Rising	Fanny Cradock	1984	W. H. Allen & Co.	237	OCLC 18205232
Loneliness of Castle Rising	Fanny Cradock	1986	W. H. Allen & Co.	220	OCLC 30472769
The Windsor Secret	Fanny Cradock	1986	W. H. Allen & Co.	270	OCLC 84119076

== Cookery books ==
Publication	Writing as	Year	Publisher	Pages	Notes	OCLC
The Practical Cook	Frances Dale	1949	Lehmann	306	Illustrations by Nigel Mould	OCLC 752521552
Daily Express Enjoyable Cookery	Frances Dale	1951	London Express Newspaper	248		OCLC 30179647
The Ambitious Cook	Frances Dale	1952	Lehman	416	Illustrations by Evadné Rowan; photographs by Percy Hennell	OCLC 25463281
New dishes From The Daily Telegraph	Bon Viveur	1952	H. A. & W. L. Pitkin	128		OCLC 1043075461
An A.B.C. of Wine Drinking	Bon Viveur	1954	Frederick Muller	96	Co-written with Johnnie Cradock	OCLC 883985729
Cooking with Bon Viveur	Bon Viveur	1955	Museum Press	127		OCLC 15079183
Bon Viveur Recipes	Fanny and Johnnie Cradock	1956	The Daily Mail	104	aka The Daily Mail Cookery Book	OCLC 800582836
Bon Viveur Request Cook Book	Bon Viveur	1958	Museum Press	127		OCLC 557697234
Mr Therm's Encyclopaedia of Vegetable Cookery Volume 1: Cabbages and Things	Bon Viveur	1959	Gas Council	160		OCLC 502237321
Mr Therm's Encyclopaedia of Vegetable Cookery Volume 2: Veg and Vim	Bon Viveur	1959	Gas Council	159		OCLC 939155776
Cooking with Can and Pack	Fanny and Johnnie Cradock	1962	Museum Press	128		OCLC 315843567
The Daily Telegraph Cook's Book	Bon Viveur	1964	The Daily Telegraph	368	Edited by Alison Leach; illustrated by William S. McCall	OCLC 752979578
Fun with Cookery	Fanny and Johnnie Cradock	1965	Edmund Ward	63	Illustrations by Gay Galsworthy; edited by Alison Leach	OCLC 59001168
Daily Telegraph Sociable Cook's Book	Bon Viveur	1967	The Daily Telegraph	400	Illustrations by William Farrow and Frank Missen	OCLC 752979580
Coping with Christmas	Fanny and Johnnie Cradock	1968	Fontana	304	Illustrations by Joan Jefferson Farjeon	OCLC 30279678
The Cook Hostess' Book	Fanny and Johnnie Cradock	1970	Collins	303	Illustrations by Val Biro	OCLC 59777475
Modest but Delicious: an Economical Cookbook for Today	Bon Viveur	1973	Arlington Books	85		OCLC 35579993
Common Market Cookery: France	Fanny Cradock	1973	BBC Books	111	Based on recipes broadcast on the BBC's Nationwide programme	OCLC 886806
Common Market Cookery: Italy	Fanny Cradock	1974	BBC Books	107	Based on recipes broadcast on the BBC's Nationwide programme	OCLC 1103649
365 Puddings	Bon Viveur	1975	The Daily Telegraph	187		OCLC 2048326
The Sherlock Holmes Cookbook	Fanny Cradock	1976	W. H. Allen & Co	254	Illustrations by Val Biro; includes recipes by Agnes Bertha Marshall	OCLC 462255855
365 Soups	Bon Viveur	1977	The Daily Telegraph			OCLC 655016139
Fanny & Johnnie Cradock's Freezer Book	Fanny and Johnnie Cradock	1978	W. H. Allen & Co	293		OCLC 4982826
Cooking Is Fun: A Children's Book	Fanny Cradock	1978	W. H. Allen & Co	134	Illustrations by Kate Simunek	OCLC 5076517
A Cook's Essential Alphabet	Fanny and Johnnie Cradock	1979	W. H. Allen & Co	117		OCLC 59213938
A Lifetime In The Kitchen Volume One: For Beginner Cooks	Fanny and Johnnie Cradock	1985	W. H. Allen & Co	336		OCLC 1012855634
A Lifetime In The Kitchen Volume Two: Family Cooking	Fanny and Johnnie Cradock	1985	W. H. Allen & Co	428		OCLC 19456067
A Lifetime In The Kitchen Volume Three: The Ambitious Cook	Fanny and Johnnie Cradock	1985	W. H. Allen & Co	455		OCLC 864425847

== Part works, etc ==
Publication	Writing as	Year	Publisher	Notes	OCLC
Happy Cooking Children	Bon Viveur	1959	Putnam	Four booklet series, comprising: 1: Beginning to Cook (64 pages); 2: Children's Outdoor Cookery (60 pages); 3: The Young Chef (55 pages); 4: Children's Party Cookery (54 pages)	OCLC 316082853
Fanny & Johnnie Cradock Cookery Programme: A Complete Cookery Programme	Fanny Cradock	1970–1972	Purnell	Published in 80 weekly instalments	OCLC 939225597

== Children's fiction ==
Publication	Writing as	Year	Publisher	Pages	Illustrator	OCLC
When Michael was Three	Francis Dale	1945	Hutchinson's Books for Young People	87	Ernest Noble	OCLC 315897367
When Michael was Six	Francis Dale	1946	Hutchinson's Books for Young People	102	Ernest Noble	OCLC 315897360
Always. The Enchanted Land	Francis Dale	1947	Hutchinson's Books for Young People	70	Nigel Mould	OCLC 1061889036
Naughty Red Lion, Beware!	Susan Leigh	1947	Hodder & Stoughton	112		OCLC 561617745
The Dryad and the Toad	Francis Dale	1948	Macdonald	64	Nigel Mould	OCLC 315897280
The Story of Joseph and Pharaoh	Francis Dale	1950	Hodder & Stoughton	52	Val Biro	OCLC 30159992
Brigadier Gooseyplum Goes to War	Francis Dale	1950	Hodder & Stoughton	85	Aileen Forbes-Boyd	OCLC 1061961475
The Gooseyplums of Duckpond-in-the-Dip	Francis Dale	1950	Hodder & Stoughton	96	Aileen Forbes-Boyd	OCLC 30159857
The Gooseyplums by the Sea	Francis Dale	1950	Hodder & Stoughton	79	Aileen Forbes-Boyd	OCLC 1062031922
Fish Knight and Sea Maiden: A Children's Romance	Francis Dale	1952	Hutchinson's Books for Young People	88	Nigel Mould	OCLC 30202119

== Travel books ==
Publication	Writing as	Year	Publisher	Pages	Notes	OCLC or Ref.
Bon Voyage - How to Enjoy your Holiday in Europe with a Car	Frances Dale	1950	John Lehman	182	Illustrations by Val Biro	OCLC 4761977
In Quest of Pleasure	Bon Viveur	1951	H. A. & W. L. Pitkin	29	Edited with slight adaptations and additions by Wendy Tiquet.	OCLC 1043173951
Eating in England's Inns	Bon Viveur	1951	H. A. & W. L. Pitkin	28		OCLC 25468550
In Search of a Holiday Hotel	Bon Viveur	1951	H. A. & W. L. Pitkin			
Eating Out in London	Bon Viveur	1951	H. A. & W. L. Pitkin			OCLC 59575619
Around Britain with Bon Viveur	Bon Viveur	1952	John Lehman	208		OCLC 877353677
Holiday in the Austrian Tyrol	Bon Viveur	1953	Frederick Muller	94		OCLC 9476302
Holiday in Barcelona and the Balearics	Bon Viveur	1954	H. A. & W. L. Pitkin	110		OCLC 253391309
Holiday in Holland	Bon Viveur	1954	Frederick Muller			OCLC 651911104
Bon Viveur's London	Bon Viveur	1954	Andrew Dakers			OCLC 59783876
Bon Viveur in London	Bon Viveur	1954	H. A. & W. L. Pitkin	186		OCLC 155857448
Holiday in Sweden	Bon Viveur	1955	Frederick Muller	93		OCLC 1078514087
Holiday in Belgium	Bon Viveur	1955	Frederick Muller	125		OCLC 30198026
Bon Viveur's London and the British Isles	Bon Viveur	1955	Andrew Dakers	256		OCLC 3032328
Holiday in Denmark	Bon Viveur	1955	Frederick Muller	125		OCLC 467557740
Holiday in the Touraine	Bon Viveur	1956	Frederick Muller	119		OCLC 4572148
Wining and Dining in France with Bon Viveur	Bon Viveur	1959	Putman	225		OCLC 499726994
Holiday on the French Riveria	Bon Viveur	1960	Frederick Muller	103		OCLC 877493216
Bon Viveur Guide to Holidays in Europe	Bon Viveur	1964	Andrew Dakers	498	Edited by Alison Leach	OCLC 18675582

== Autobiography ==
Two works, both published under the name Fanny Cradock.

Publication	Year	Publisher	Pages	OCLC
Something's Burning	1960	Putnam	277	OCLC 760273090
Time to Remember – A Cook for All Seasons	1981	Webb & Bower	160	OCLC 906412217

== Cookery books, as contributor ==
Publication	Author/Editor	Year	Publisher	Pages	Notes	OCLC
Definitely Different: The Daily Telegraph Recipe Book	Unnamed	1954	The Daily Telegraph	160	Contributor as Bon Viveur; also includes recipes by Robin Adair, Gretel Beer, Claire Butler, Elizabeth David, Frank Gerrard, Marguerite Patten, Madame Prunier, Egon Ronay and J. M. Scott	OCLC 1043290792
Come For A Meal: A Woman's Hour Cookery Book	Nesta Hollis	1966	BBC Books	47	Contributor only	OCLC 25469797
The Book of Foil Cookery	Ann Body	1967	Spectator Publications	63	Contains "special recipes by Fanny & Johnnie Cradock"	OCLC 221940579
The Art of Cookery Made Plain and Easy	Hannah Glasse	1971	S. R. Publishers	419	Introduction by Cradock	OCLC 561206256
The Royal Cookery Book	Jules Gouffé	1973	EP Publishing	599	Translated from the original French by Alphonse Gouffé; introduction by Cradock	OCLC 928177307
Wine for Today	Johnnie Cradock	1975	Frederick Muller	198	Introduction by Cradock	OCLC 1976961

== Cookery booklets ==
Publication	Writing as	Year	Publisher	Pages	Notes	OCLC, ISBN or Ref.
Inside Information: the Experts' Advice from The Daily Telegraph Food and Cookery Brains Trust	Bon Viveur	1955	The Daily Telegraph	31		OCLC 1043088529
Natural and Pure Olive Oil – Book of recipes	Bon Viveur	1963	International Olive Oil Council		Based on a seven-minute television advertisement	
Home cooking with Fanny Cradock	Fanny Cradock	1965	BBC Books	33	Illustrations by Rosalind Dease	OCLC 650373880
Adventurous Cooking with Fanny Cradock	Fanny Cradock	1965	BBC Books		TV series: April–June 1965	OCLC 778918996
Everyday Cookery: a Recipe Supplement to Woman's Hour talks	Fanny Cradock	1965	BBC Books	11	Written with Freda Cowell	OCLC 745567022
Problem Cooking with Fanny Cradock	Fanny Cradock	1967	BBC Books	26	TV series: 1967	OCLC 13052909
Eight Special Menus with Their Accompanying Wines for the Busy Cook-Hostess	Fanny and Johnnie Cradock	1967	Mendham Bros/Gas Council	31		OCLC 30282107
Ten Classic Dishes	Fanny Cradock	1968	BBC Books	32	TV series: January–March 1968	ISBN 9780563073352
Colourful Cookery	Fanny Cradock	1968	BBC Books	32	TV series: October–December 1968	OCLC 13053140
Giving a Dinner Party	Fanny Cradock	1969	BBC Books	16	TV series: July–October 1969	OCLC 1112517915
Fanny Cradock Invites	Fanny Cradock	1970	BBC Books	32	TV series: July–October 1970	OCLC 13053127
Fanny Cradock's Nationwide Cook Book	Fanny Cradock	1972	BBC Books	30		OCLC 877188475
Lessons for a Cook: A series of articles reprinted from The Daily Telegraph in which they appeared month-by-month	Bon Viveur	1974	The Daily Telegraph	32	Illustrations by Troy Hill-Jackson	OCLC 877756682
Fanny Cradock's Christmas Cooking	Fanny Cradock	1975	Wolfe Publishing	48	TV series: November–December 1975	ISBN 9780723407072
Pasta Cookery	Bon Viveur	1975	The Daily Telegraph	12		OCLC 16304632

== References and sources ==
=== Sources ===
==== Books ====
- Cradock, Fanny (1976). The Lormes of Castle Rising (2nd ed.). New York: E.P. Dutton & Co. pp. 15–16. ISBN 978-0-8415-0437-0.
- Ellis, Clive (2007). Fabulous Fanny Cradock: TV's outrageous queen of cuisine. Stroud, Glous: Sutton. ISBN 978-0-7509-4546-2.
- Geddes, Kevin (2019). Keep Calm and Fanny On! The Many Careers of Fanny Cradock. Coventry, West Midlands: Fantom Publishing. ISBN 978-1-7819-6339-5.

==== Journals, newspapers and magazines ====
- Geddes, Kevin (November 2017). "Above All, Garnish and Presentation: An Evaluation of Fanny Cradock's Contribution to Home Cooking in Britain". International Journal of Consumer Studies. 41 (6): 745–753. doi:10.1111/ijcs.12387.
- Levy, Paul (2015). "Cradock, Phyllis Nan Sortain [Fanny] (1909–1994)". Oxford Dictionary of National Biography (online ed.). Oxford University Press. doi:10.1093/ref:odnb/54851. (Subscription, Wikipedia Library access or UK public library membership required.)

==== Websites ====
- "Cradock, Fanny (1909–1994) Credits". Screenonline. British Film Institute. Archived from the original on 2016-08-02.
- Dyja, Eddie. "Cradock, Fanny (1909–1994)". Screenonline. British Film Institute. Archived from the original on 2016-08-02.
- "Fanny Cradock". British Film Institute. Archived from the original on June 3, 2018.
- "Television". Fanny Cradock.
