= Cradick =

Cradick may refer to:

- Charles Cradick (1896–1954), American attorney
- Julian Cradick (born 1947), English former cricketer
- Peter David Cradick (1959–2013), professionally known as Kidd Kraddick, American radio host and television personality
- Cradick Corner, Indiana, United States, an unincorporated community

== See also ==
- Craddick (disambiguation)
- Cradock (disambiguation)
- Craddock (disambiguation)
