= Craddock =

Craddock may refer to:

== People ==
- Craddock (surname), a Welsh surname and a list of people with it
- Craddock Dufty (1900–1955), New Zealand rugby league player

== Places ==
- Craddock, Alberta, Canada, a former unincorporated community
- Craddock, Missouri, United States, an unincorporated community
- Craddock, West Virginia, United States, an unincorporated community
- Craddock Massif, a mountain massif in the Sentinel Range, Ellsworth Mountains, Antarctica
  - Mount Craddock, forming the south extremity of Craddock Massif
- Craddock Moor stone circle, a stone circle in Cornwall, England, United Kingdom

== Other uses ==
- Mrs Craddock, a 1902 novel by William Somerset Maugham

== See also ==
- Craddockville, Virginia, United States, an unincorporated community
- Cradock (disambiguation)
- Craddick (disambiguation)
- Cradick (disambiguation)
- Caradog (disambiguation)
