= Caradog =

Caradog, Caradoc, Caradawg, or Cradawg, Latinised as Caratacus and anglicised as Craddock, is a given name for men in the Welsh language. It may refer to:

== People ==
- Caradog ap Bran, son of Bran the Blessed in Welsh mythology
- Caratacus, 1st-century British chieftain at the time of the Roman conquest
- Caradocus, mythical British king of the 4th century
- Caradoc, suitor of Saint Winifred
- Caradog ap Meirion, 8th-century king of Gwynedd
- Caradoc, figure from history and the Matter of Britain
- Caradoc of Llancarfan, 12th-century author of a Life of Gildas
- Caradog ap Gruffudd, 11th-century Prince of Gwent
- Saint Caradoc, 12th-century Welsh hermit
- Griffith Rhys Jones (Caradog), conductor of the Côr Mawr of some 460 voices (the South Wales Choral Union), which twice won first prize at Crystal Palace choral competitions in London in the 1870s
- Caradoc Rees, Welsh lawyer and politician
- Caradog Roberts, 19th-century Welsh composer
- Caradoc Evans, 20th-century Welsh author and playwright
- Caradog Prichard, 20th-century Welsh poet and novelist
- Caradog Jones, Welsh mountaineer

== Other uses ==
- Caradoc, Ontario, a Canadian township now part of Strathroy-Caradoc
- Caer Caradoc, a hill in the English county of Shropshire
- Caer Caradoc (Chapel Lawn), an Iron Age hill fort in Shropshire
- Caradoc Series, a geological subdivision of the Ordovician System
- HMS Caradoc, two ships of the Royal Navy
- An antagonist named for Griffith Rhys Jones in Susan Cooper's novel The Grey King

== See also ==
- Caradec
- Ceretic (disambiguation)
- Cerdic of Wessex
- Craddock (disambiguation)
- Cradock (disambiguation)
