= Craddick =

Craddick is a surname. Notable people with the surname include:

- Tom Craddick (born 1943), member of the Texas House of Representatives
- Christi Craddick (born 1970), member of the Texas Railroad Commission and daughter of Tom Craddick

== See also ==
- Cradick (disambiguation)
- Craddock (disambiguation)
- Cradock (disambiguation)
