= Cradock =

Cradock may refer to:

== People ==
- Christopher Cradock (1862–1914), admiral in the Royal Navy
- Edward Cradock (fl. 1571), English theologian and alchemist
- Eric Cradock (d. 1985), Canadian stockbroker and sports entrepreneur
- Fanny Cradock (1909–1994), British writer, restaurant critic and television cook
- Frederick Cradock, George Cross recipient, for heroism in his attempts to save a workmate from boiling steam in 1943 in Suffolk
- H. C. Cradock, born Augusta Whiteford in 1863, an English children's book writer
- John Cradock (alias Craddock) (c.1708–1778), English churchman, Church of Ireland Archbishop of Dublin from 1772
- John Francis Cradock, 1st Baron Howden GCB (1759–1839), British peer, politician and soldier
- Johnnie Cradock (1904–1987), British cook, writer, broadcaster and Army Major
- John Francis Cradock (later Caradoc) (1762–1839), 1st Baron Howden, army officer
- John Hobart Cradock (later Caradoc) (1799–1873), 2nd Baron Howden, diplomat
- Johnnie Cradock (1904–1987), British cook, writer, broadcaster and Army Major
- Marmaduke Cradock (1660–1716, also Luke Cradock), English painter of birds and animals
- Matthew Cradock, first governor of the Massachusetts Bay Company
- Percy Cradock (1923–2010), British diplomat
- Steve Cradock (b. 1969), guitarist for the British rock group Ocean Colour Scene
- Stuart Cradock (b. 1949), English cricketer.
- Walter Cradock (c. 1606–1659), Welsh Anglican clergyman
- William Cradock (Archdeacon of Lewes) (fl. 1512–1516), English pre-Reformation priest
- William Cradock (Dean of St Patrick's) (1741–1793), English Anglican priest, Archdeacon of Kilmore

== Places ==
- Cradock, Eastern Cape, a town in South Africa
- Cradock, South Australia
- Cradock Channel, connecting the Hauraki Gulf with the Pacific Ocean
- Cradock Historic District, located at Portsmouth, Virginia, named after Christopher Cradock

== See also ==
- Caradog (disambiguation)
- Craddock (disambiguation)
