= Hors d'oeuvre =

Small dish served before main meal

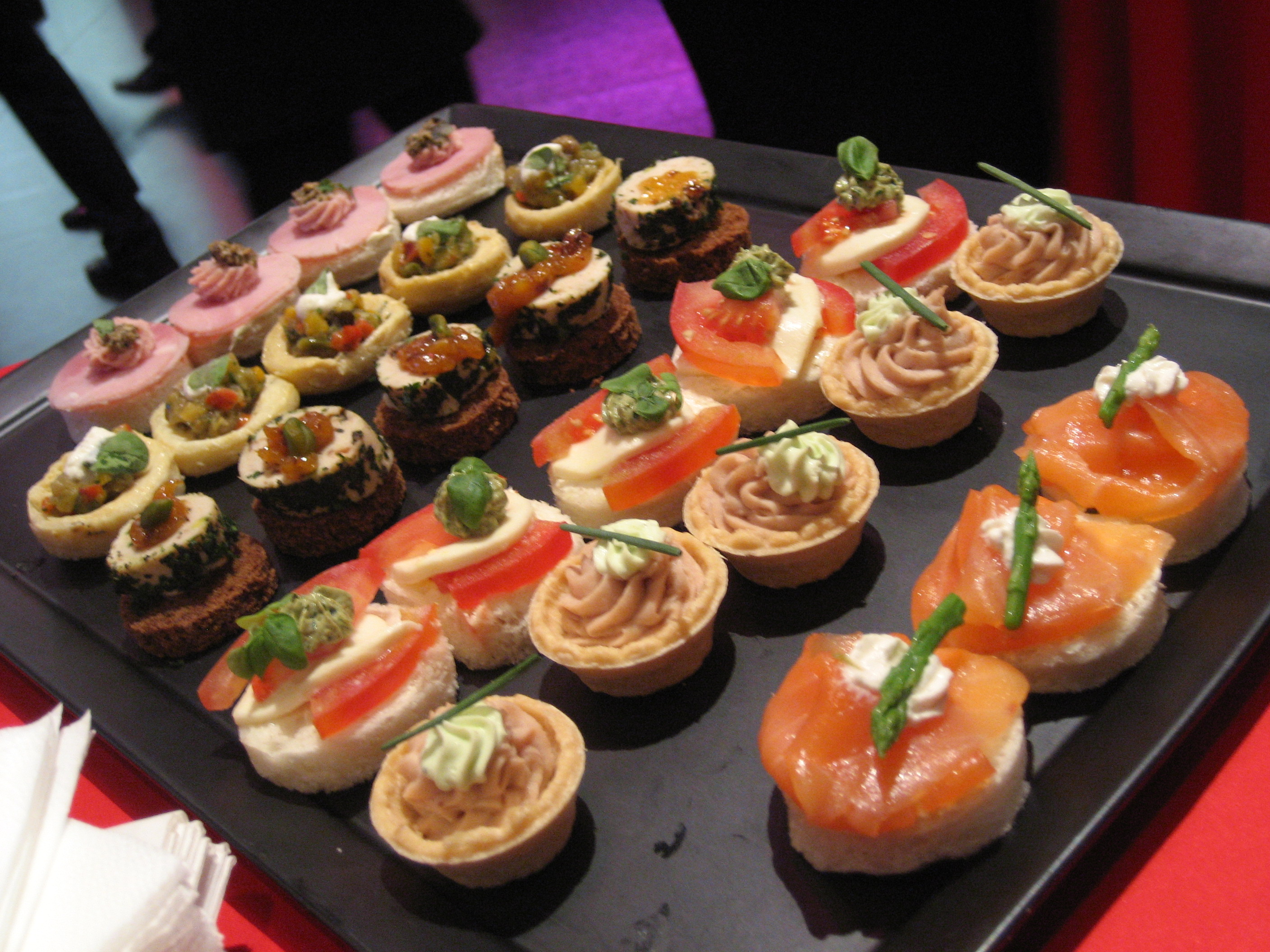
A tray of canapés, a form of hors d'oeuvres, at a cocktail party

An hors d'oeuvre (/ɔːr ˈdɜːrv(rə)/ or DURV(-rə); French: hors-d'œuvre [ɔʁ dœvʁ(ə)]), entrée, appetiser, appetizer or starter is a small dish served before a meal in European cuisine. Some hors d'oeuvres are served cold, others hot. Hors d'oeuvres may be served at the dinner table as a part of the meal, or they may be served before seating, such as at a reception or cocktail party. Formerly, hors d'oeuvres were also served between courses.

Typically smaller than a main dish, an hors d'oeuvre is often designed to be eaten by hand. Hors d'oeuvre are typically served at parties as a small "snack" before a main course.

== Etymology ==
Hors d'œuvre in French literally means 'outside the work', that is "not part of the ordinary set of courses in a meal". In practice, it is a dish which stands on its own as a snack or supports the main course. The French spelling is the same for singular and plural usage. In English, the typographic ligature ⟨œ⟩ is usually replaced by the digraph ⟨oe⟩ and two plural forms are acceptable: "hors d'oeuvre" (same as singular) or "hors d'oeuvres" (pronounced /ɔːr ˈdɜːrvz/).

== Origins ==
A small number of food historians believe that the tradition may have begun in Russia, where small snacks of fish, caviar and meats were common after long travels. The tradition may have reached Italy, Greece and the Balkan nations through Russia or Persia. Many national customs are related, including the Swedish smörgåsbord, Russian zakuski, Middle Eastern mezze, and Italian antipasto. During the Roman Period the meal practice was to have two main courses which were supplemented before the meal with small amounts of fish, vegetables, cheeses, olives and even stuffed dormice. These would be served at the start of the meal known as either gustatio or promulsis. The Greeks called the appetiser course propoma. As early as 500 AD, the Babylonian Talmud (Yoma 83^{b}) recounts the practice of feeding sweet desserts to a person before the main course of a meal in order to revive his strength and increase his appetite (Aramaic: מגרר גריר).

=== French service ===
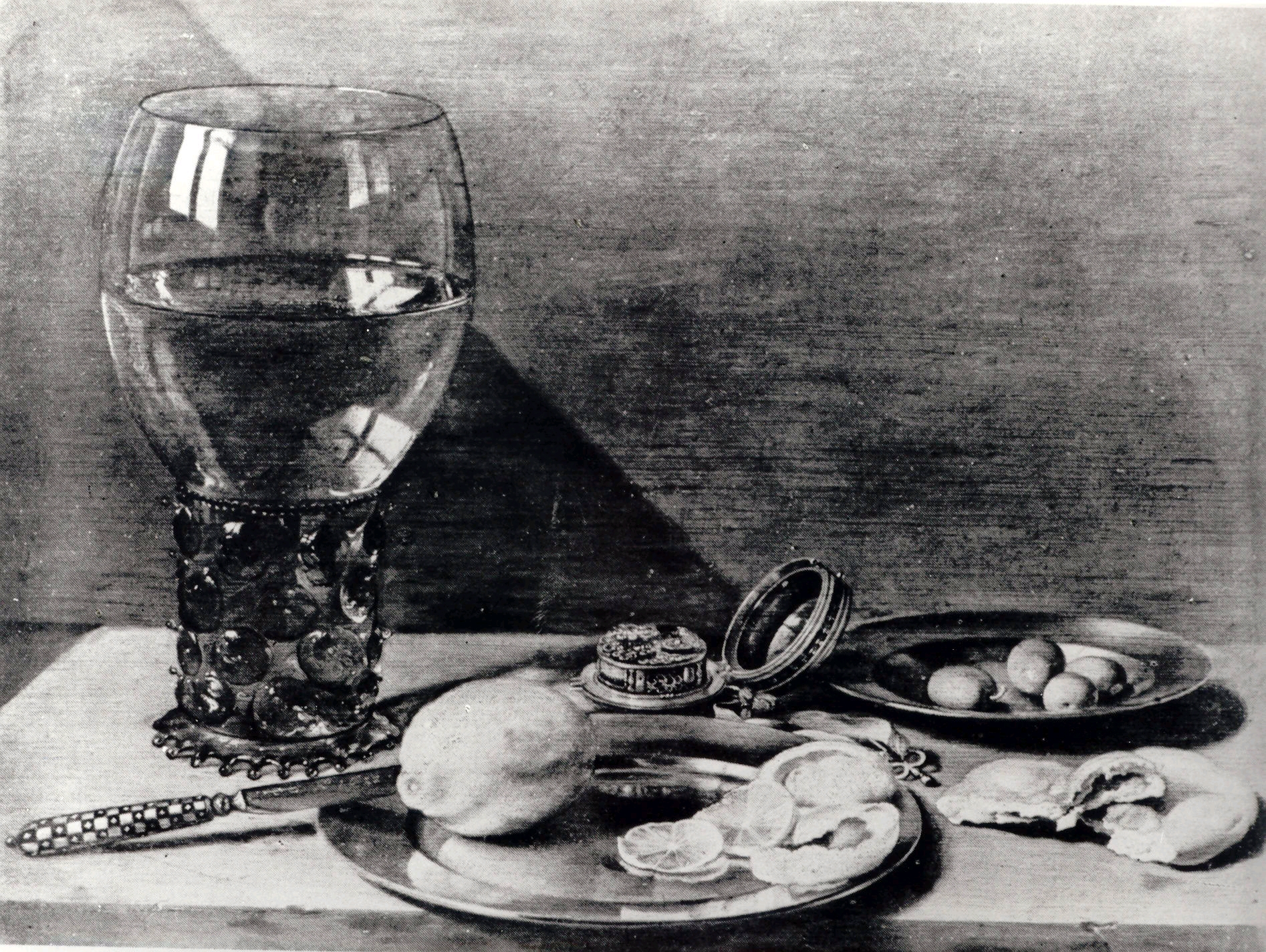
Hors-d'oeuvres (1623) by Pieter Claesz

During the Middle Ages formal French meals were served with entremets between the serving of plates. These secondary dishes could be either actual food dishes, or elaborate displays and even dramatic or musical presentations. In the 14th century, recipes for entremets were mostly made with meat, fish, pork and vegetables. By the 15th century the elaborate display and performances were served up between courses, and could be edible or displays of subjects relevant to the host, created in butter sculpture or other types of crafted work. With the introduction in the 17th century of service à la française, where all the dishes are laid out at once in very rigid symmetrical fashion, entremets began to change in meaning but were still mainly savoury. Along with this came elaborate silver and ceramic table displays as well as pièces montées. The entremets were placed between the other dishes within the main work of the meal.

At about this time in the 17th century, smaller dishes began to be served by being placed outside the main work of symmetrically placed dishes. These were known as hors d'oeuvre. Hors d'oeuvres were originally served as a canapé of small toasted bread with a savoury topping before a meal. The first mention of the food item was by François Massialot in 1691, mentioned in his book: Le cuisinier roial et bourgeois (The Royal and Bourgeois Cook) and explained as "Certain dishes served in addition to those one might expect in the normal composition of the feast". In the French publication Les plaisirs de la table, Edouard Nignon stated that hors d'oeuvres originated in Asia. He went on to state that the French considered hors-d'oeuvres to be superfluous to a well cooked meal. Service à la française continued in Europe until the early 19th century. After the 19th century the entremet would become almost exclusively a sweet dish or dessert with the British custom of the "savoury" being the only remaining tradition of the savoury entremet.

The style of formal dining changed drastically in the 19th century, becoming successive courses served one after the other over a period of time. Some traditional hors d'oeuvres would remain on the table throughout the meal. These included olives, nuts, celery and radishes. The changing, contemporary hors d'oeuvres, sometimes called "dainty dishes", became more complicated in preparation. Pastries, with meat and cream sauces among other elaborate items, had become a course served after the soup.

=== English savouries ===
As a result of French influence on the English language, "hors d'oeuvre" has become a commonly used term in English to refer to small dishes served before meals. The custom of the savoury course is of British origin and comes towards the end of the meal, before dessert or sweets or even after the dessert, in contrast to the hors d'oeuvre, which is served before the meal. The British favoured the savoury course as a palate cleanser before drinking after the meal, which made the hors d'oeuvre before the meal unnecessary. The savoury is generally small, well spiced and often served hot, requiring cooking just before serving. In the Victorian and Edwardian periods, savouries included such toppings as fried oysters wrapped in bacon, and Scotch woodcock, which was a savoury made of scrambled eggs, ground black pepper and Gentleman's Relish on buttered toast, served hot. In France, cheese was often part of the savoury course or added with simple fruit as a dessert. A typical Edwardian dinner might consist of up to four courses that include two soups, two types of fish, two meats, ending with several savouries then sweets.

=== American appetisers and cocktail hors d'oeuvres ===
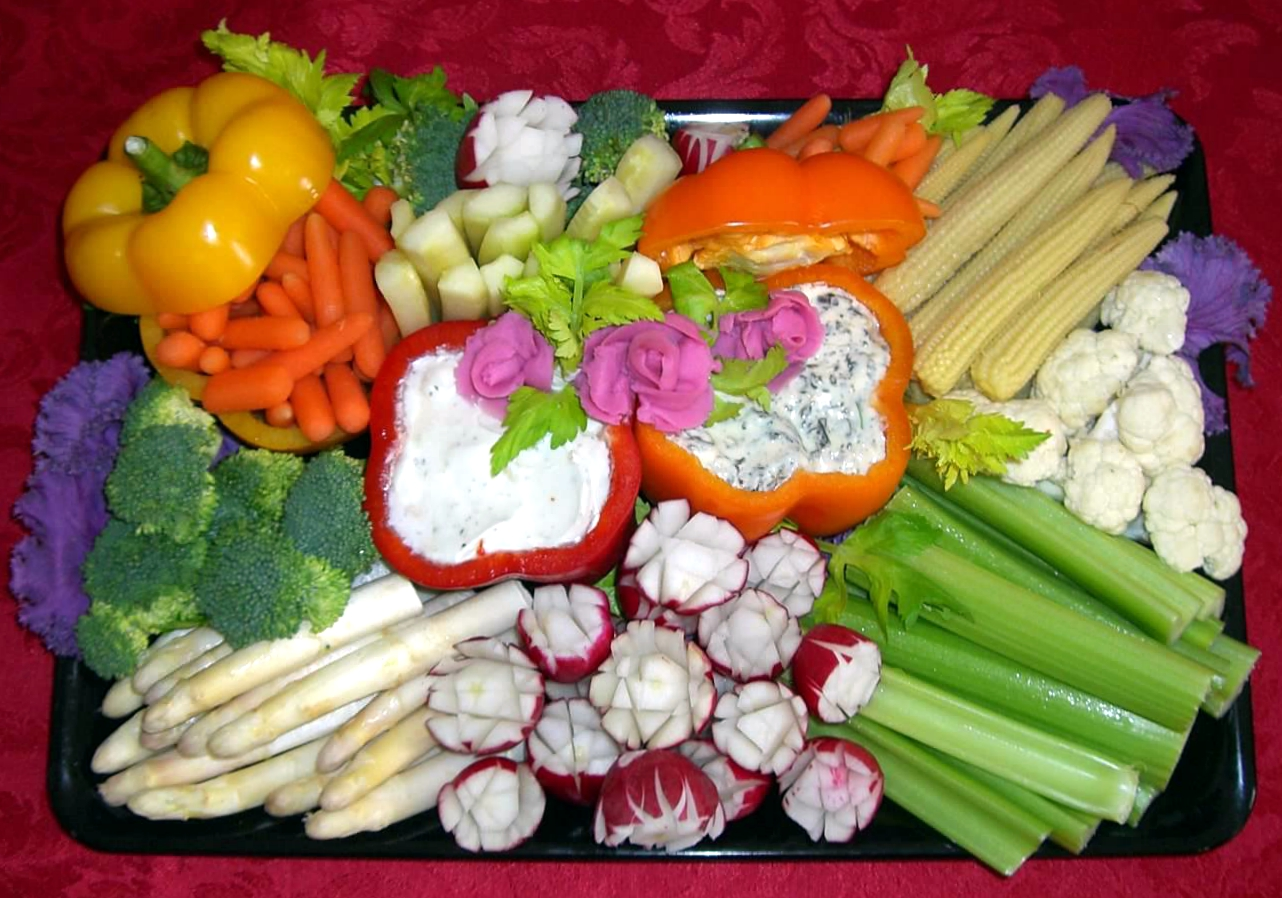
Various crudités served at a cocktail party

The term appetiser (American English: appetizer) is a synonym for hors d'oeuvre. It was first used in the United States and England simultaneously in 1860. Americans also use the term to define the first of three courses in a meal, an optional one generally set on the table before guests were seated. Drinks before dinner became a custom towards the end of the 19th century. As this new fashion caught on, the British took inspiration from the French to begin serving hors d'oeuvres before dinner. A cocktail party is considered a small gathering with mixed drinks and light snacks. Hors d'oeuvres may be served as the only food offering at cocktail parties and receptions, where no dinner is served afterward. After the end of prohibition in the United States, the cocktail party gained acceptance. Prior to the First World War, American dinner guests would be expected to enter the dining room immediately where drinks would be served at the table with appetisers. This changed by the 1920s, when hors d'oeuvres were served prior to a non-alcoholic cocktail; however, after the repeal of Prohibition in the United States, cocktail parties became popular with many different hors d'oeuvres meant as something to help counter the stronger drinks. It is the cocktail party that helped transfer the hors d'oeuvres from the formal dining table to the mobility of the serving tray. These appetisers passed around the cocktail party may also be referred to as canapés.

== Preparation ==
In restaurants or large estates, hors d'oeuvres are prepared in a garde manger which is a cool room. Hors d'oeuvres are often prepared in advance. Some types may be refrigerated or frozen and then precooked and then reheated in an oven or microwave oven as necessary before serving.

== Use ==
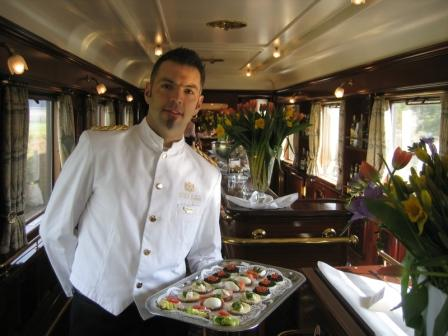
Steward in a vintage 1920s railcar serving canapés on a tray as part of butler style service

If there is an extended period between when guests arrive and when the meal is eaten, for example during a cocktail hour, these might serve the purpose of sustaining guests during the wait, in the same way that apéritifs are served as a drink before meals.

It is also an unwritten rule that the dishes served as hors d'oeuvres do not give any clue to the main meal. They are served with the main meal menu in view either in hot, room temperature or cold forms; when served hot they are brought out after all the guests arrive so that everyone gets to taste the dishes.

Hors d'oeuvres before a meal may be rotated by waiters or passed. Stationary hors d'oeuvres served at the table on a tray may be referred to as table hors d'oeuvres or as buffet-style. Passed hors d'oeuvres provided by servers are part of butler-style service. or butlered hors d'oeuvres.

== Examples ==
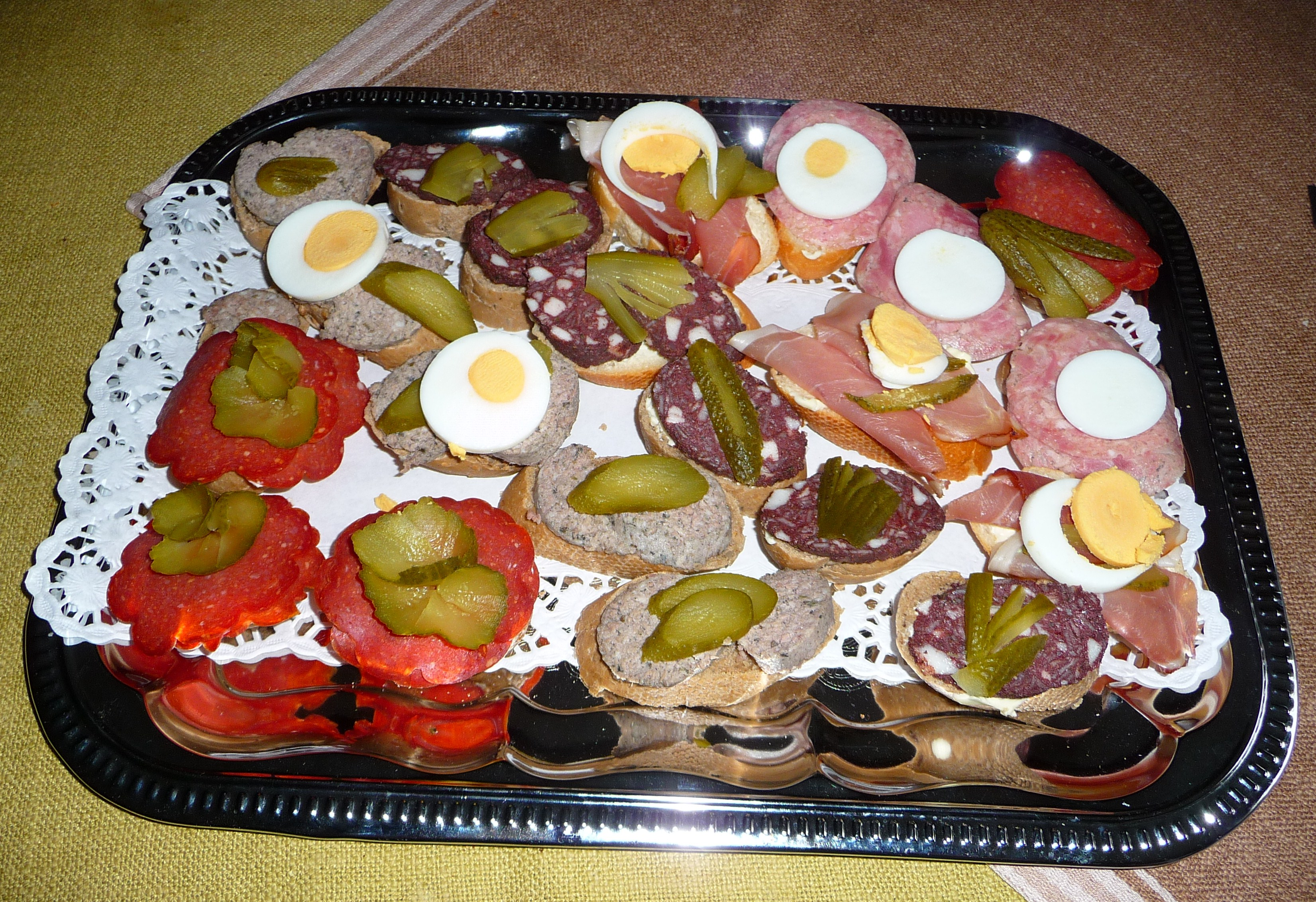
A tray of hors d'oeuvres

Though any food served before the main course is technically an hors d'oeuvre, the phrase is generally limited to individual items, such as cheese or fruit. A glazed fig topped with mascarpone and wrapped with prosciutto is an hors d'oeuvre, and plain figs served on a platter may also be served as hors d'oeuvres. It could be pickled beets or anchovy eggs as topping over tomatoes as part of the initial "drinks" session such as of alcoholic or non-alcoholic beverages. They are also served in the forms of dips, spreads, pastries, olives or nuts with or without a base of egg, cheese, meats, vegetables, seafood or breads. Single cold items served are smoked salmon, avocado pear, caviar, pâté, shellfish cocktails and melon with garnishes and decorations. Seasoned hot dishes served are of vegetables, meat, fish, egg, pasta, cheese, soufflés, tartlets, puff pastry or choux pastry.

- Bruschetta (Italian pronunciation: [bruˈsketta])
- Canapés
- Caviar
- Charcuterie
- Deviled eggs
- Dumplings
- Gherkin
- Pigs in a blanket
- Smoked egg
- Spanakopita
- Tongue toast
Hors d'oeuvres

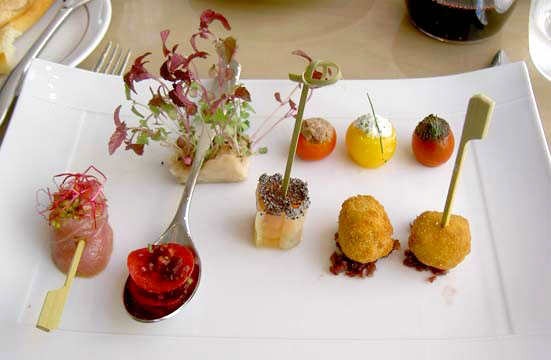
Appetisers in a restaurant

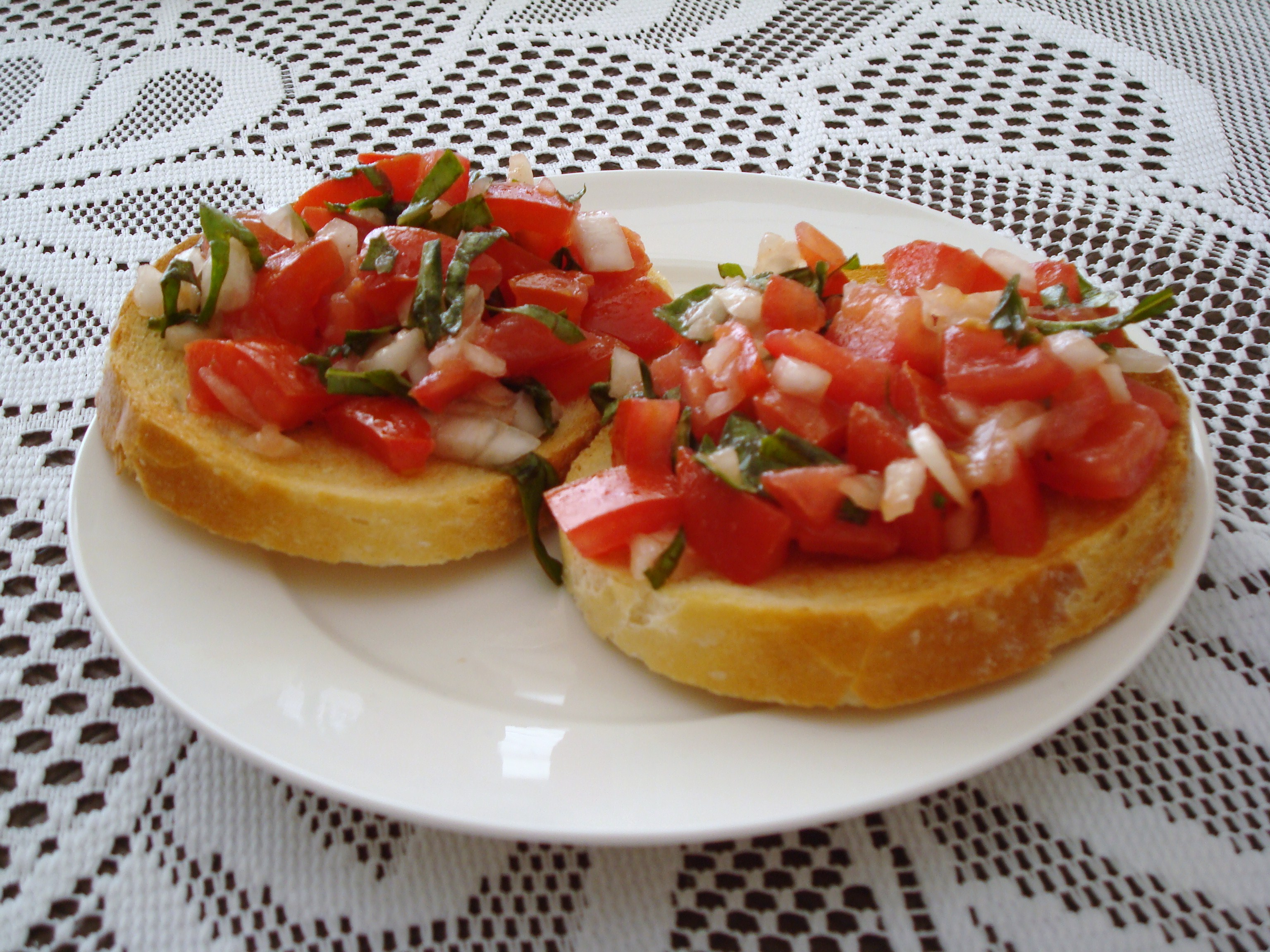
Tomato bruschetta

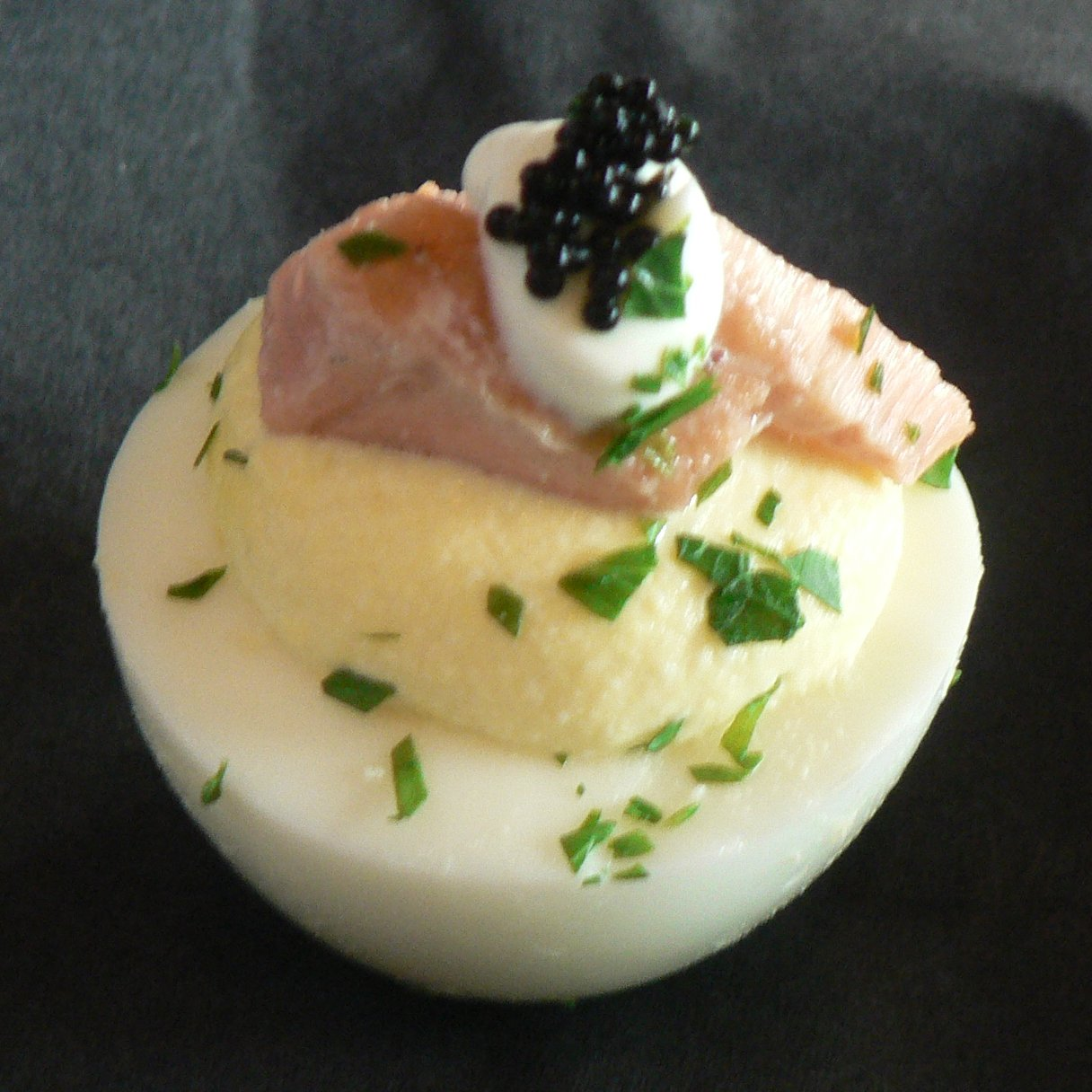
Deviled eggs, a cold hors d'oeuvre

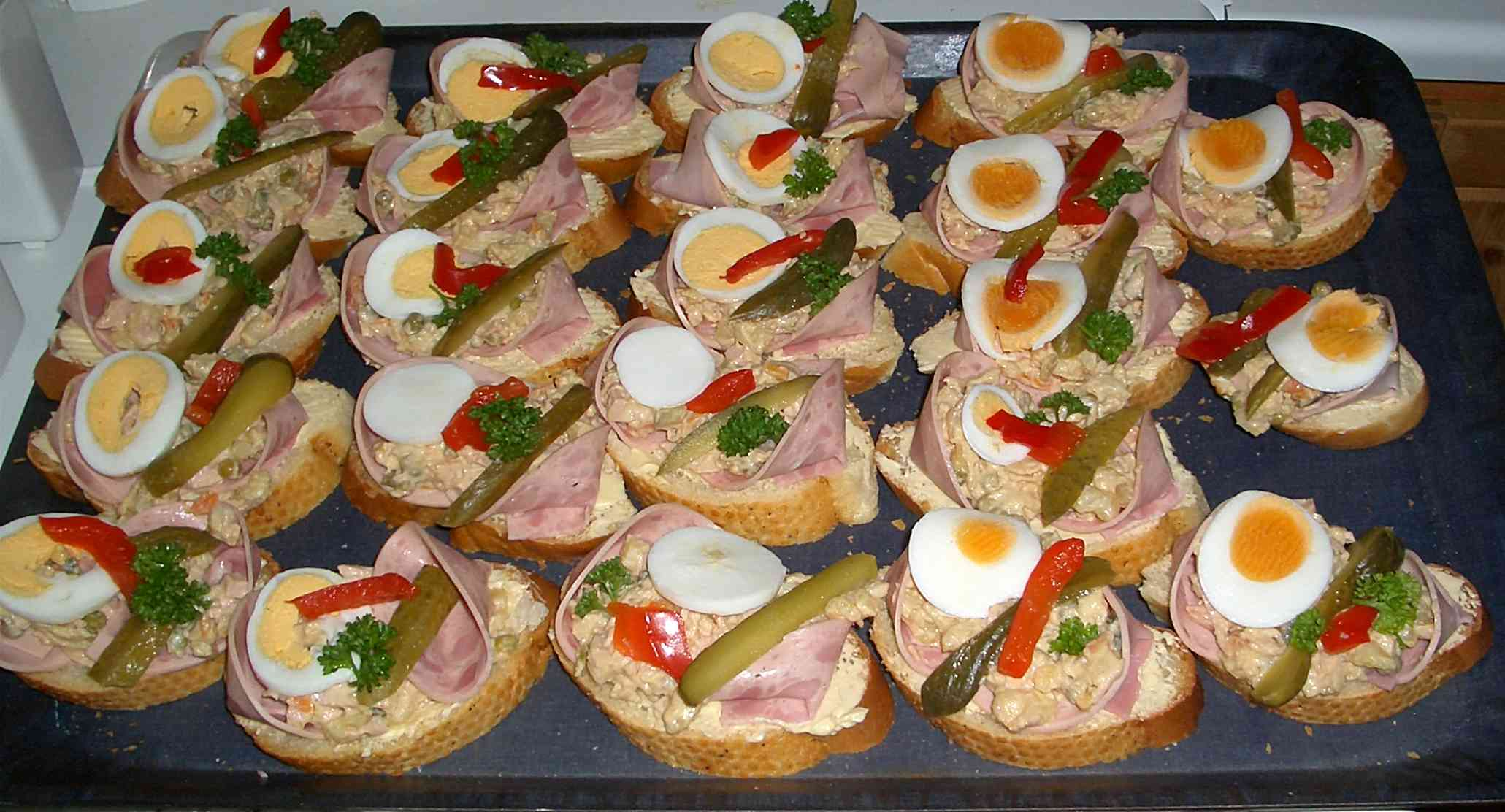
Obložené chlebíčky, a Czech and Slovak appetiser or snack

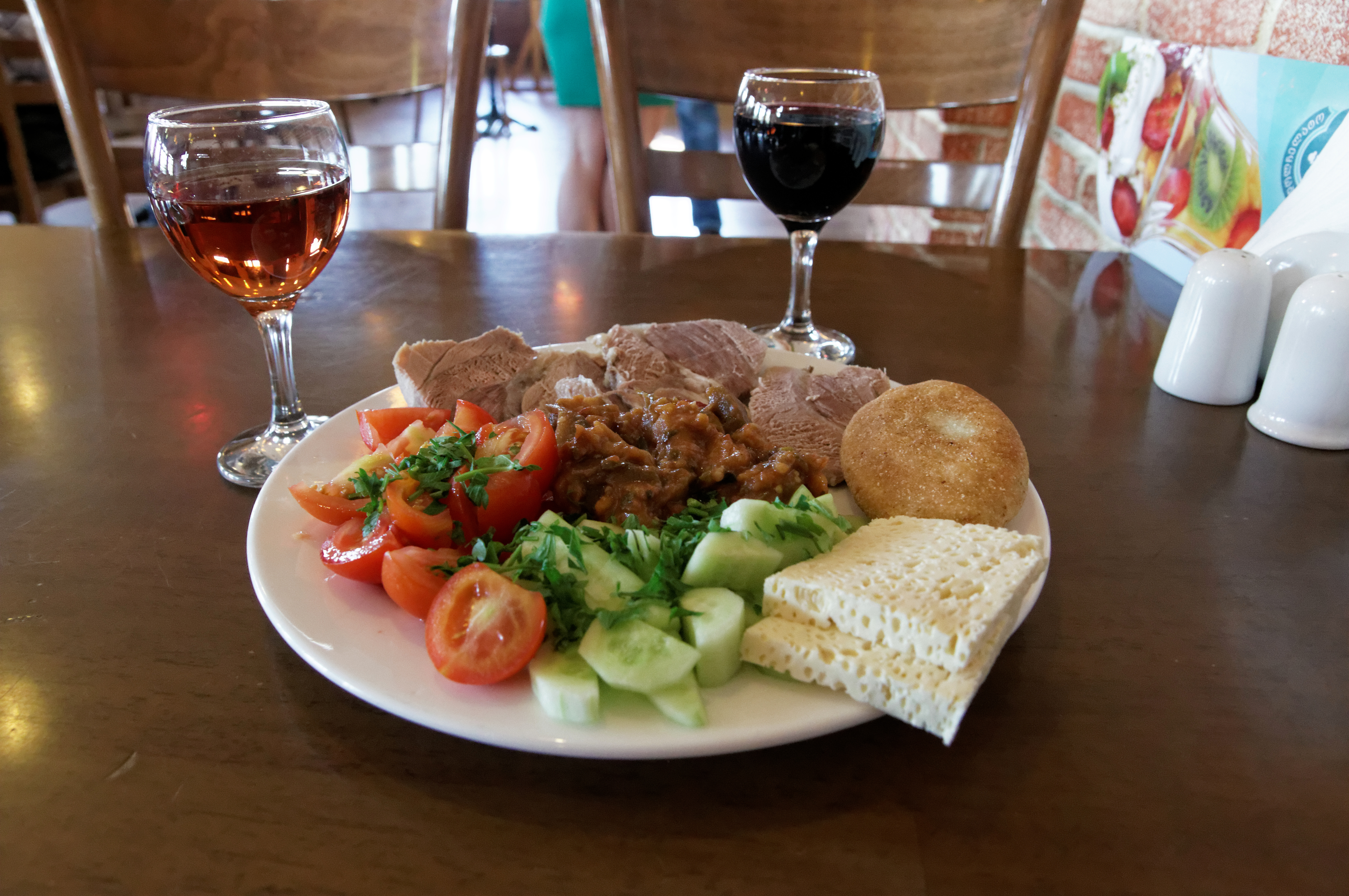
Hors-d'oeuvre, Georgia

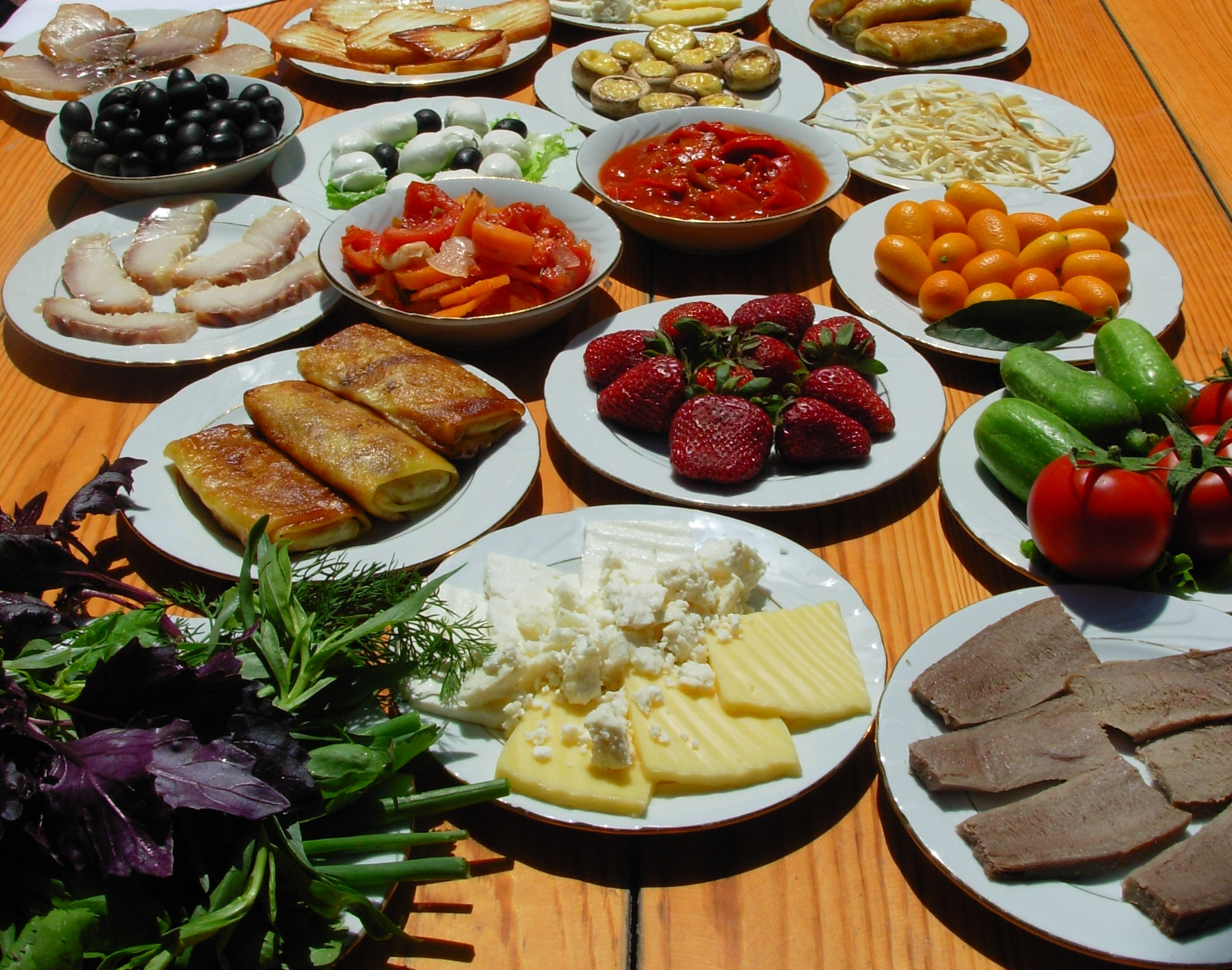
Hors d'oeuvres in Azerbaijani cuisine

== By culture and language ==
=== In the Americas ===
In Mexico, botanas refers to the vegetarian varieties commonly served in small portions in wine bars. In many Central American countries, hors d'oeuvres are known as bocas (lit. 'mouthfuls'). Pasapalos (lit. 'drink passer') is Venezuelan Spanish for an hors d'oeuvre.

=== In Asia ===
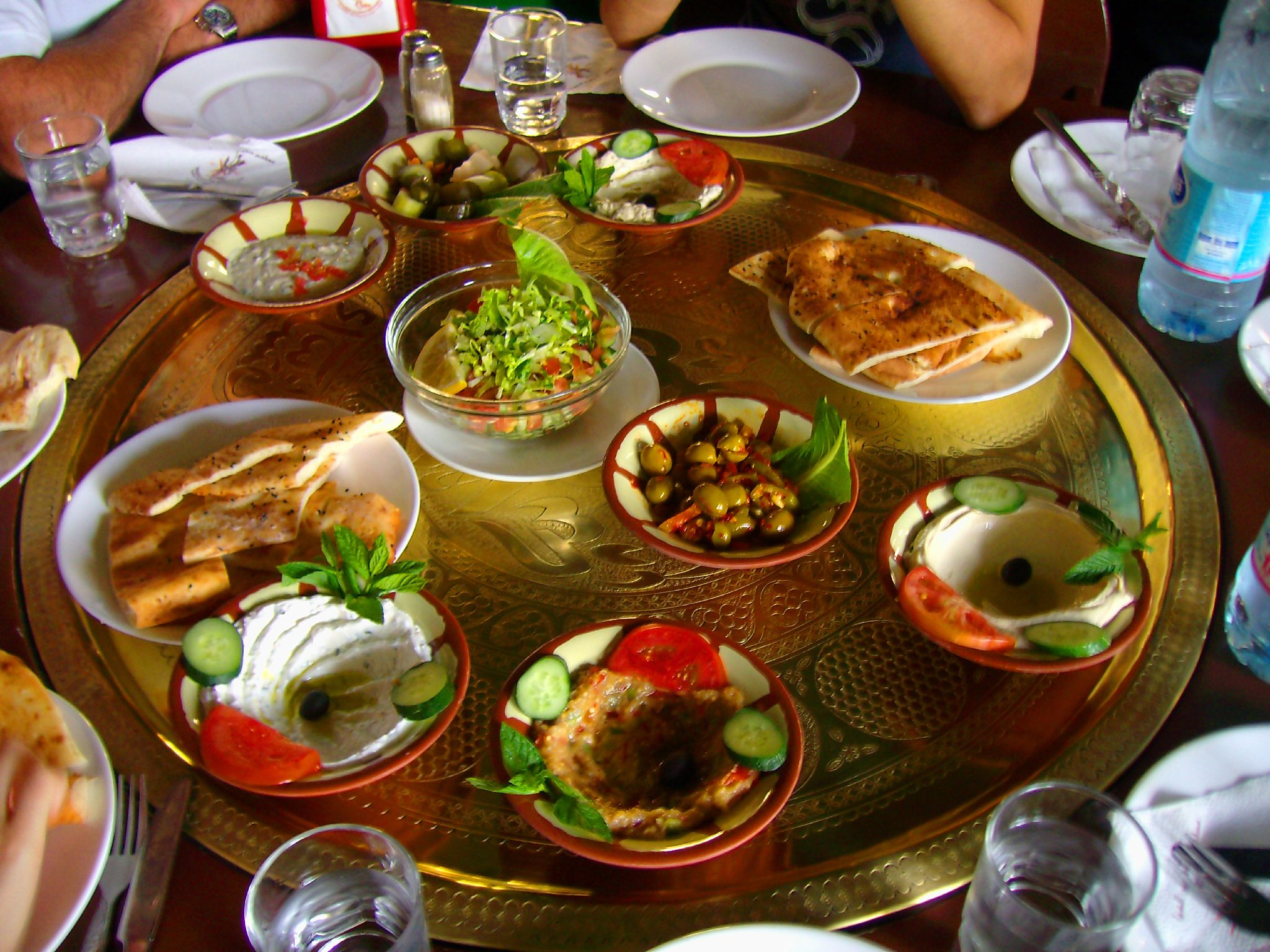
Meze in Jordanian cuisine

In Arabic, moqabbelat (مقبلات, "things which make one accept what is to come". From root قبل lit. "to accept") is the term for an hors d'oeuvre. In India, it is known as chaat, which is served throughout the day. Dahi puri is another snack from India which is especially popular from the city of Mumbai in the state of Maharashtra and in the Ahmedabad city of Gujarat state. Chaat is the snack food consumed separately and not part of main course meals.

Zensai (前菜, lit. before dish) is Japanese for an hors d'oeuvre; commonly for western dishes, ōdoburu (オードブル), which is a direct transcription of hors d'oeuvre, is used. In Korea, banchan (반찬) is a small serving of vegetables, cereals or meats. Additional Korean terms for hors d'oeuvres include jeonchae (전채), meaning "before dish" or epitaijeo (에피타이저), meaning "appetiser". In Vietnamese Đồ nguội khai vị ("cold plate first course") is the name for an hors d'oeuvre. In Mandarin, lěng pán 冷盘 ("cold plate") or qián cài 前菜 ("before dish") are terms used for hors d'oeuvres, which are served in steamer baskets or on small plates. Meze is a selection of small dishes served in Mediterranean cuisine, Middle Eastern cuisine, and Balkan cuisine. Mezedakia is a term for small mezes. Pembuka (lit. 'opening') is Indonesian for an hors d'oeuvre. Yemekaltı is Turkish for an hors d'oeuvre. Caviar served in Iran is the traditional roe from wild sturgeon in the Caspian and Black Seas.

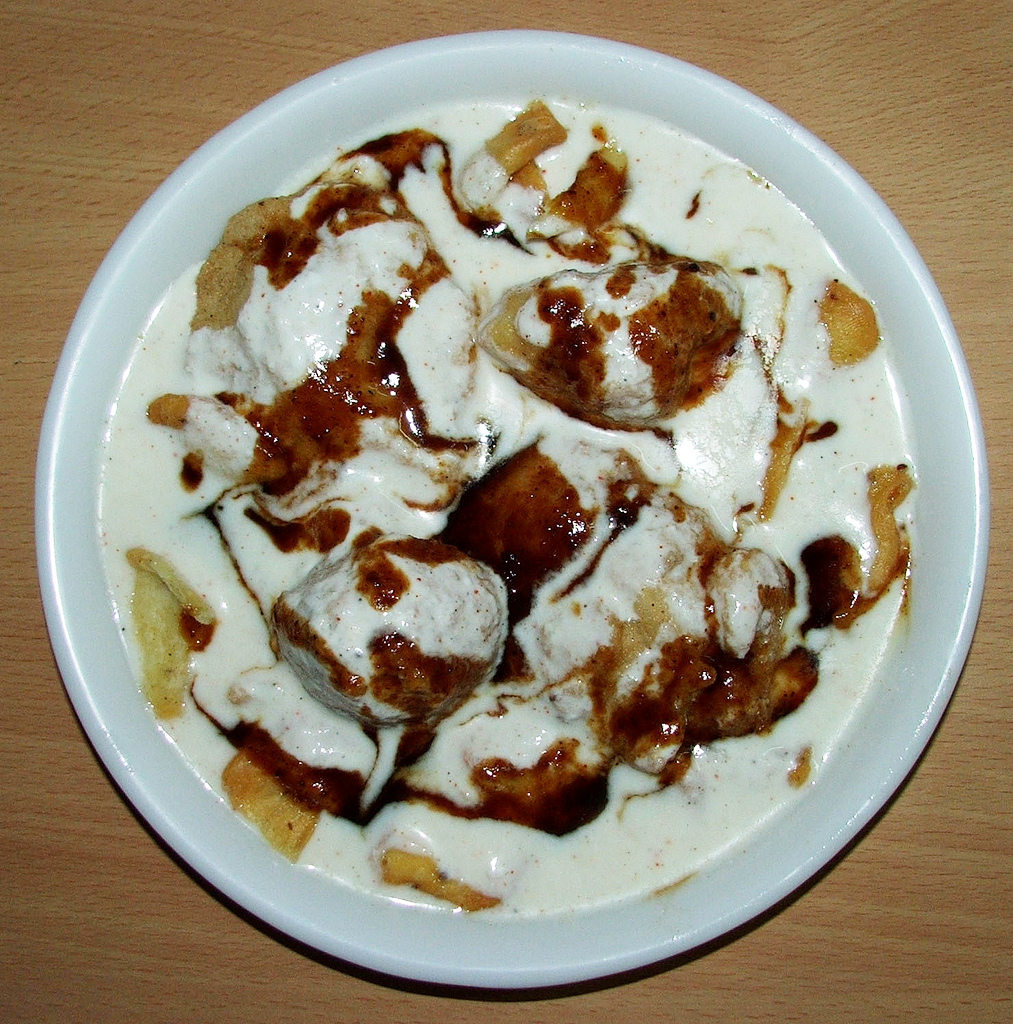
Chaat, a starter in Indian cuisine

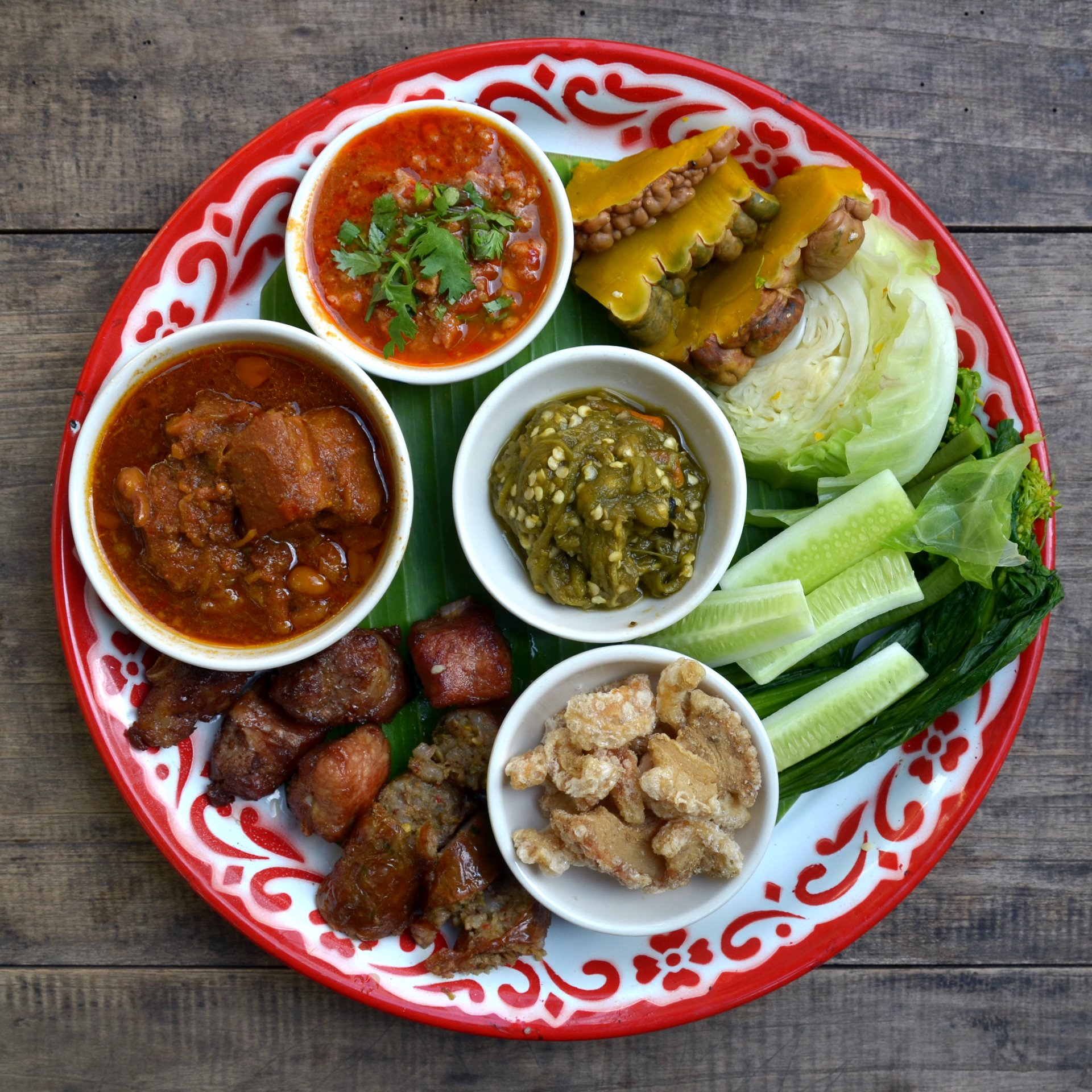
A sampling of starters in Northern Thai cuisine (Lanna cuisine)

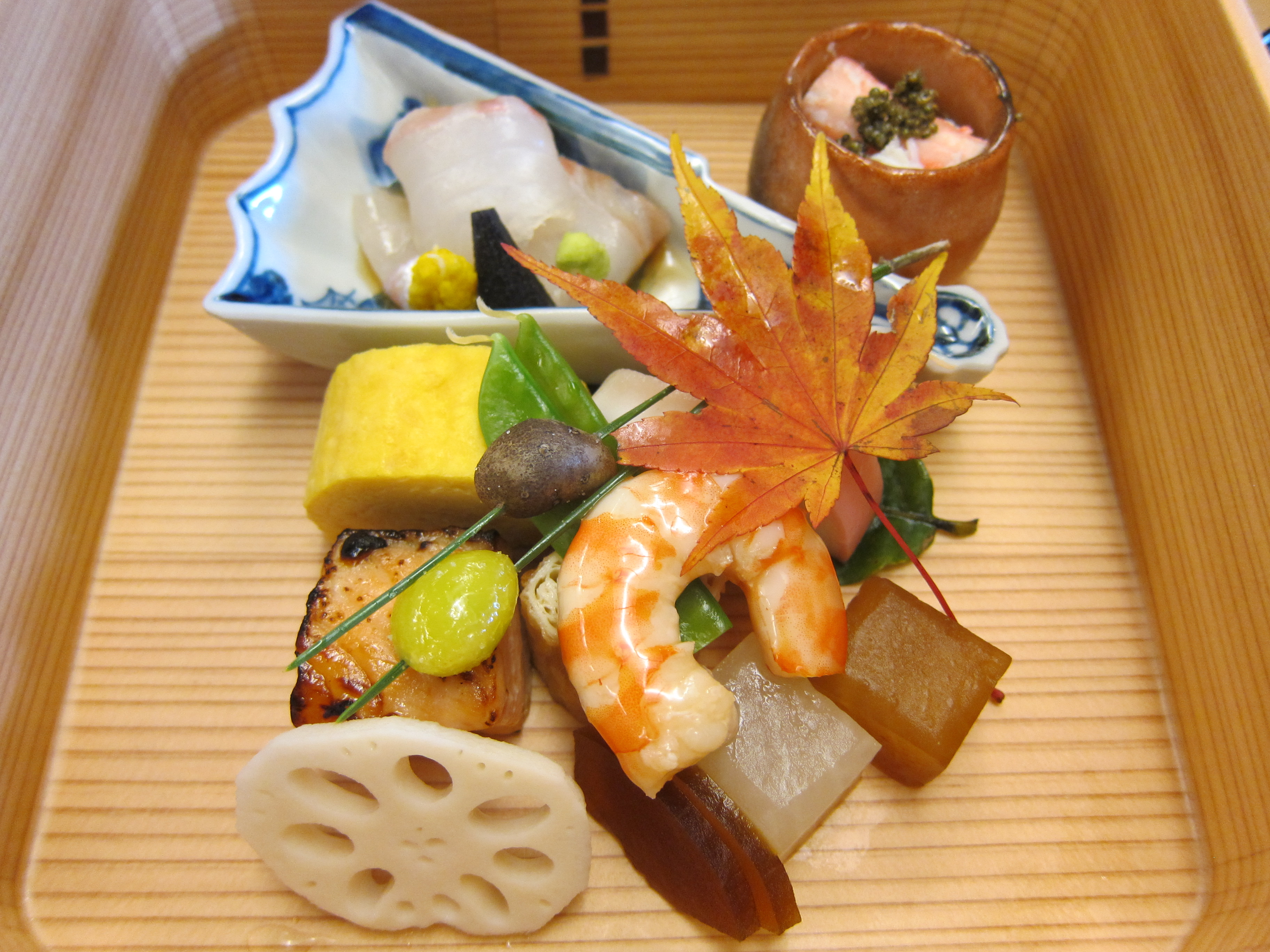
Zensai in Japanese cuisine

=== In Europe ===
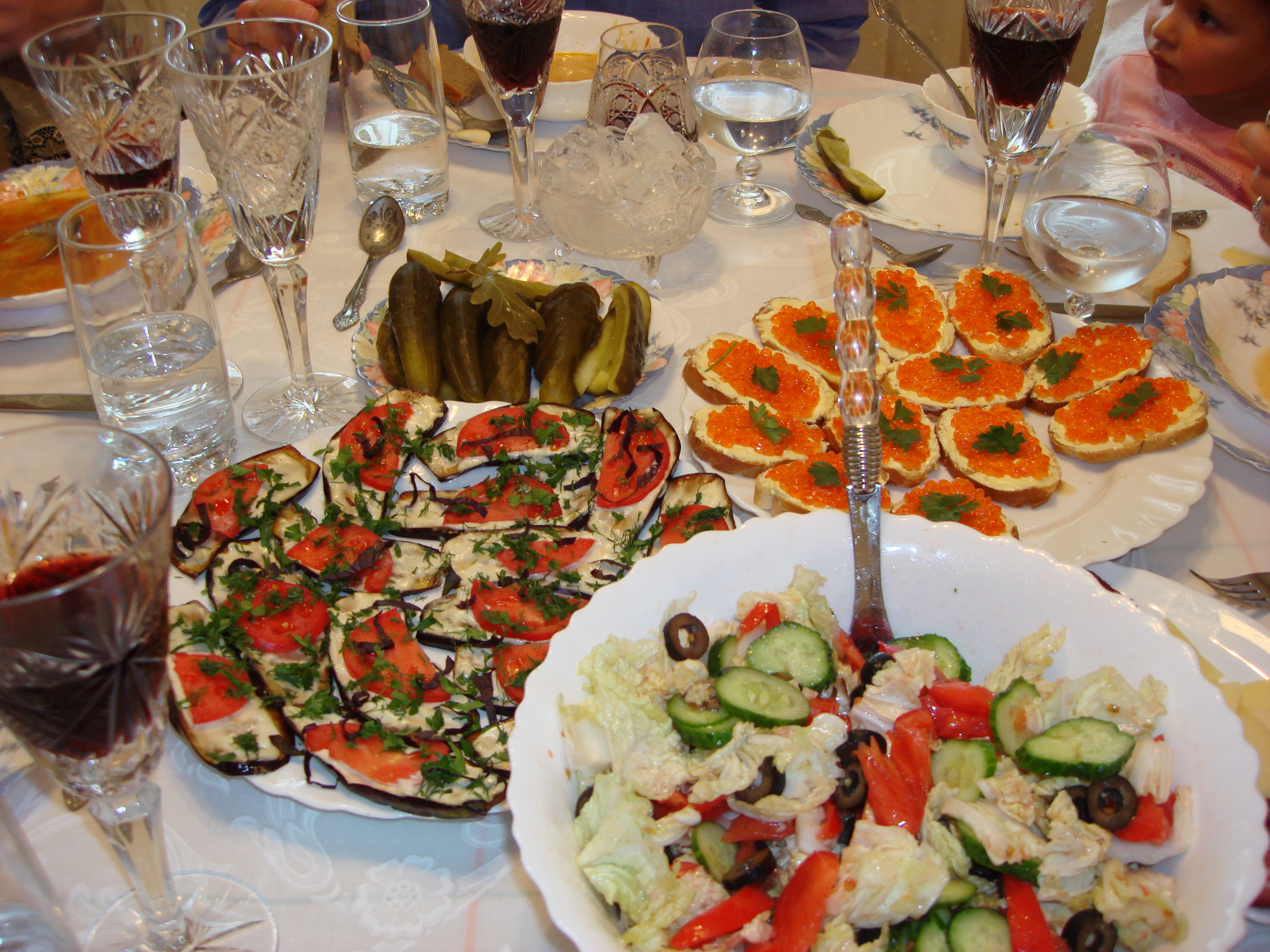
Zakuski in Russian cuisine

In England, devils on horseback is a hot hors d'oeuvre in different recipes, but in general they are a variation on angels on horseback, made by replacing oysters with dried fruit. The majority of recipes contain a pitted date (though prunes are sometimes used). Starter is a common colloquial term for an hors d'oeuvre in the UK, Ireland, and India. Crudités from France are a blend of salads of raw vegetables and the serving has a minimum of three vegetables of striking colors. Zakuski are hors d'oeuvres in Russian cuisine and other post-Soviet cuisines, now served at the table with vodka before the main course. Salads, cured meat and fish, pickled vegetables, small savory pastries, bread and caviar are frequently included. In Tsarist Russia, wealthy homes and restaurants often offered zakuski at a buffet. Zakuski often outweigh the main course, so foreigners are warned that they are not the entire meal. In Italian antipasto, meaning "before the meal" and may consist of small portions of cured meats, fresh or preserved fish, fresh, marinated or pickled vegetables, olives, cheese, and bread; other similar hors d'oeuvres can be found in the rest of Southern Europe under different names (entrada in Portuguese, entrante or entremés in Spanish). Voorgerecht in Dutch means the dish ('gerecht') before ('voor') the main course. Fattoush is a bread salad in Levantine cuisine made from toasted or fried pieces of pita bread (khubz 'arabi) combined with mixed greens and other vegetables. It belongs to the family of dishes known as fattat (plural) or fatta, which use stale flatbread as a base.

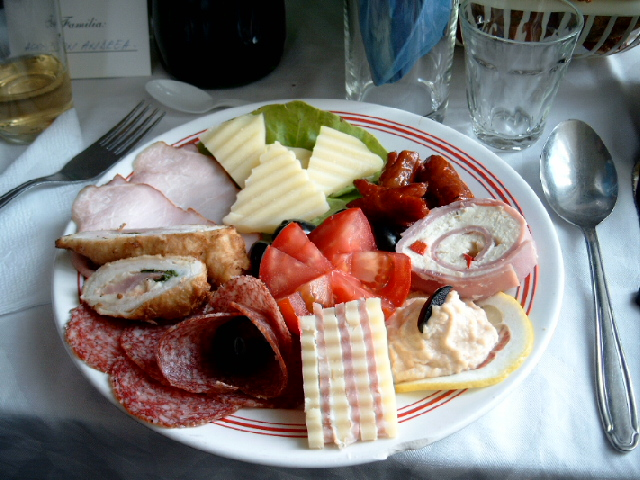
Various hors d'oeuvres at a banquet of Romanian cuisine

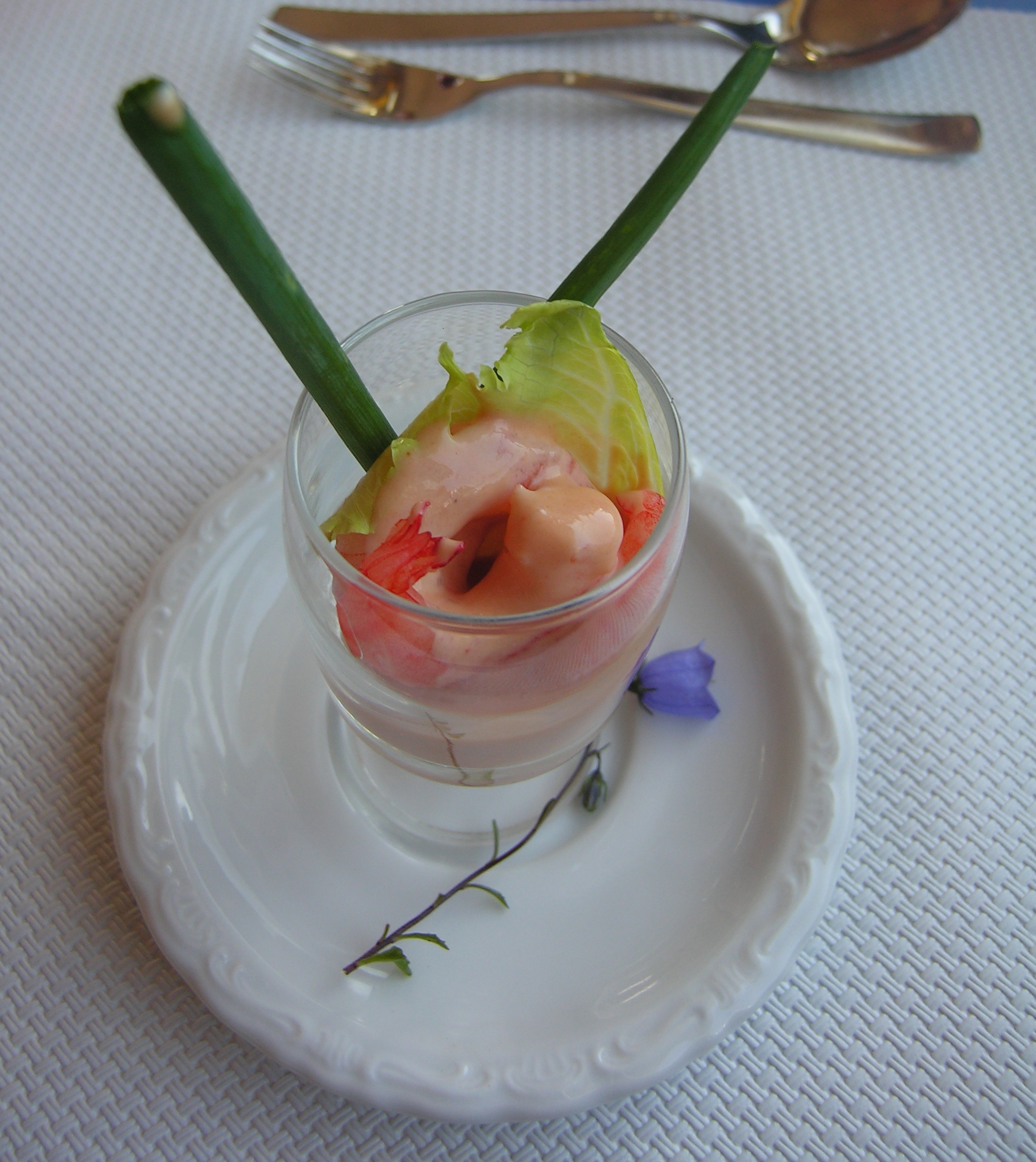
An appetiser served at a restaurant serving Swiss cuisine

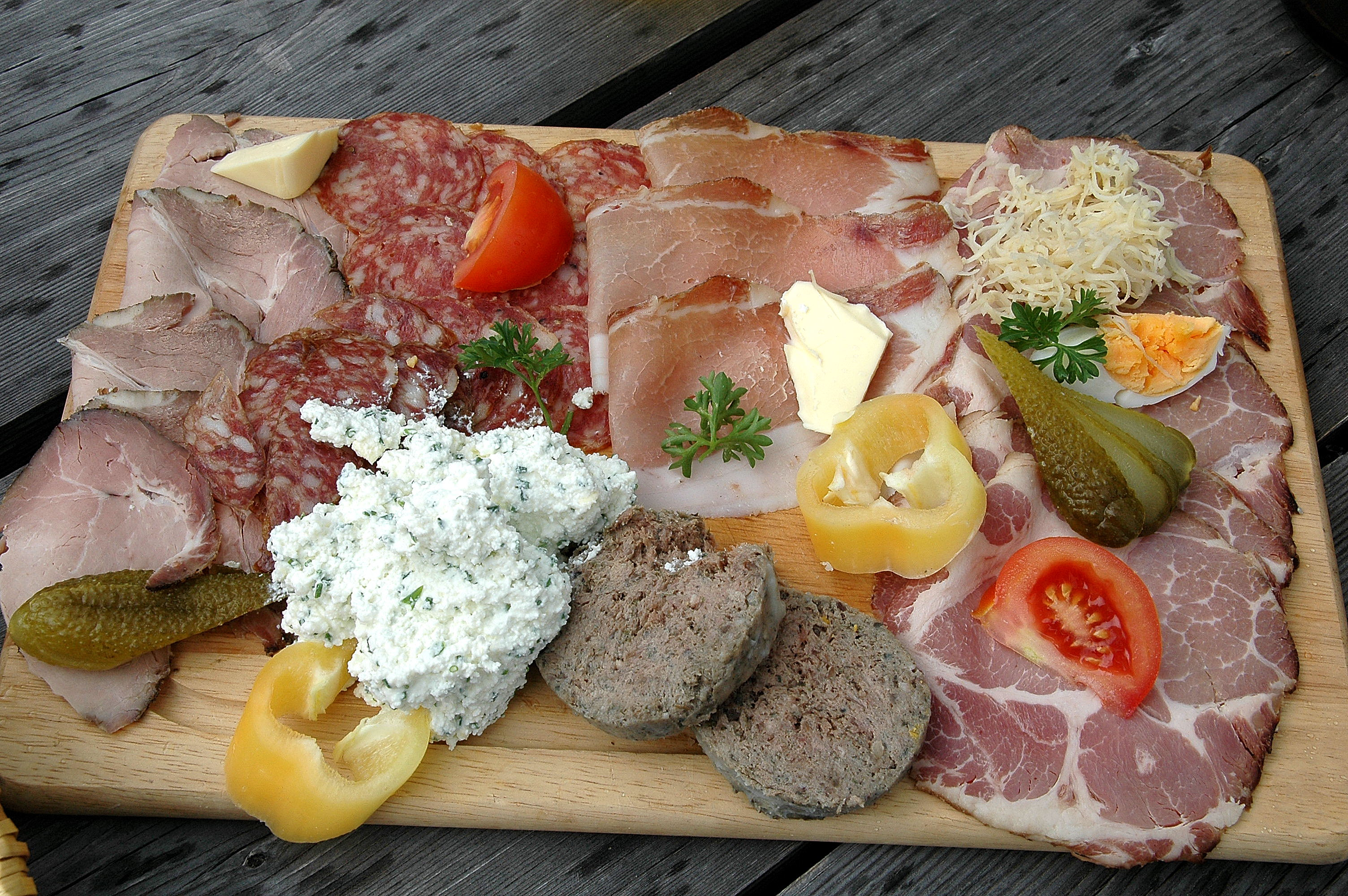
Typical Carinthian or Styrian "Brettljause", composed of different kinds of cold meat, horseradish, hard-boiled egg, meat paste, Liptauer, vegetables, butter and curd cheese

=== In the United States ===
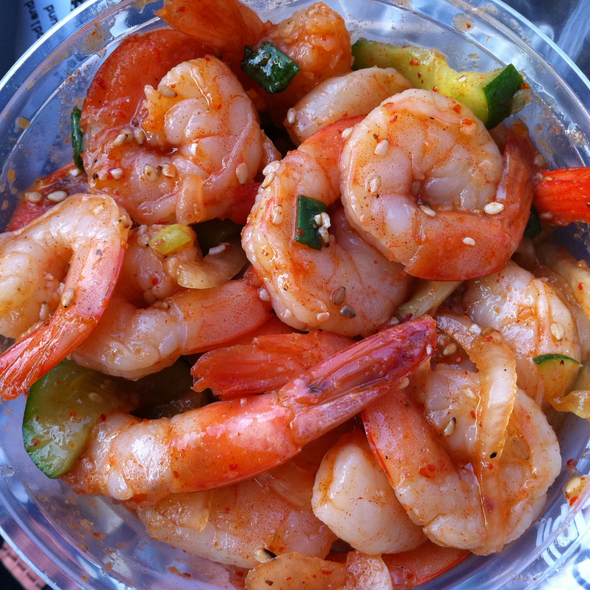
Poke is a raw fish salad served as an appetiser in the cuisine of Hawaii.

In the United States the custom appears to have come from California, where a foreign saloon owner may have put out trays of simple hors d'oeuvres to serve his customers. This tradition soon became the 5-cent beer and free lunch in early America before prohibition ended the custom.

In the U.S., 'appetizers', referring to anything served before a meal, is the most common term for hors d'oeuvres. Light snacks served outside of the context of a meal are called hors d'oeuvres (with the English-language pluralisation).

==== Hawaii ====
In the Hawaiian language hors d'oeuvres and appetisers are called pūpū. Hawaiian culinary influences are very diverse due to the multiple ethnicities living in the islands. This diversity, along with the Americanisation of entertaining in the mid 20th century led to the Hawaiian Cocktail and the pūpū (hors-d'oeuvre) served at the beginning of luaus. This invention of a faux Polynesian experience is heavily influenced by Don the Beachcomber, who is credited for the creation of the pūpū platter and the drink named the Zombie for his Hollywood restaurant. At Don's the food was traditional Cantonese cuisine served with a fancy presentation. The first pūpū platters were eggrolls, chicken wings, spare ribs as well as other Chinese-American foods. Eventually Trader Vic would create the Mai Tai in his restaurants in the San Francisco Bay Area and the Tiki bar would become an American cocktail tradition.

=== In Oceania ===
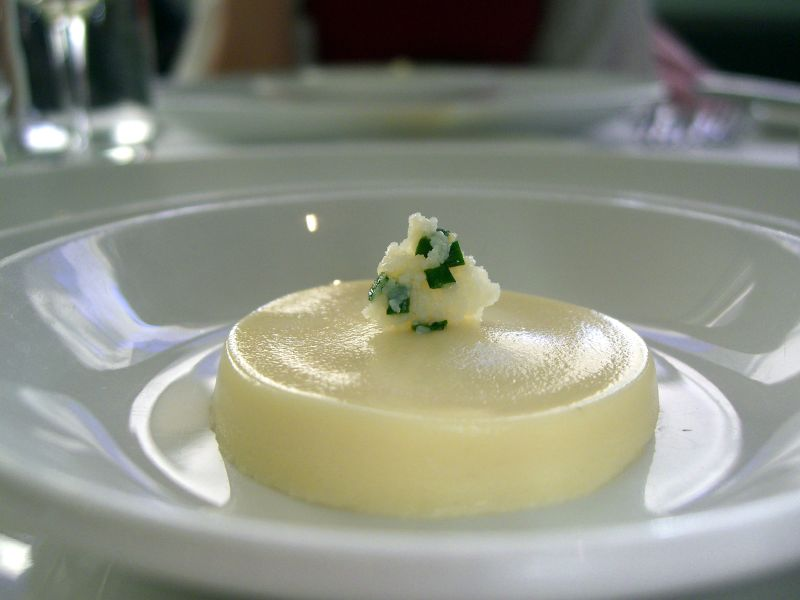
Amuse-bouche

Hors d'oeuvres, also called amuse-bouches, served around bars in Australia are oysters and alsace foie gras. Appetisers in New Zealand are lamb skewer or blue cod sliders. In New Zealand the Māori call their snacks Kai Timotimo. Kiribati appetisers served include pastes made from chickpeas and eggplant, meat dishes with spices and wheat. Samoan foil chicken and roast pork, tidbits of meat in a smoky, spicy sauce are appetisers in Samoa. In Tonga, puu-puus or appetisers served are Waikiki shrimp and grilled pineapple with dipping sauce.

=== In other countries ===
Appetisers served in Kenya are raw and fresh vegetables and assorted dips with decorations. Before modern-day hors d'oeuvre were introduced from Europe into South Africa, starters served consisted of eastern fish sambals and cooked bone marrow served with bread.

== See also ==
- List of hors d'oeuvre
- Barquette
- Cicchetti
- Crostini
- Dim sum
- Entrée
- Finger food
- Gujeolpan
- List of foods
- Picada
- Pinchito
- Pincho
- Side dish
- Small plates
- Sushi
- Tapas

== Bibliography ==
- Cracknell, H. L.; Kaufmann, R. J. (1999). "Chapter 6: Hors-d'oeuvre". Practical Professional Cookery. Cengage Learning. pp. 87–108. ISBN 978-1-86152-873-5.
- Davidson, Alan (21 September 2006). The Oxford Companion to Food. Oxford University Press. ISBN 978-0-19-280681-9.
- Dunham, J. R. (April 2004). Two Women in Africa: The Ultimate Adventure. iUniverse. ISBN 978-0-595-31232-0.
- Foskett, David; Paskins, Patricia; Rippington, Neil; Thorpe, Steve (29 August 2014). Practical Cookery for the Level 3 NVQ and VRQ Diploma, 6th edition. Hodder Education. ISBN 978-1-4718-0671-1.
- Louis, Regis St; D'Arcy, Jayne; Gilbert, Sarah; Harding, Paul; Le Nevez, Catherine; Maxwell, Virginia; Pozzan, Olivia; Watson, Penny (1 May 2012). Lonely Planet East Coast Australia 4. Lonely Planet. ISBN 978-1-74220-660-8.
- Romero, Pedro (2007). Night+Day Mexico City. ASDavis Media Group. ISBN 978-0-9776245-6-0.
- Rombauer, Irma S.; Becker, Marion Rombauer; Becker, Ethan; Guarnaschelli, Maria (5 November 1997). JOC All New Rev. – 1997. Simon and Schuster. ISBN 978-0-684-81870-2.
- Smith, Dennis Edwin (2003). From Symposium to Eucharist: The Banquet in the Early Christian World. Fortress Press. ISBN 978-1-4514-0653-5.
- Willan, Anne (23 March 2012). The Country Cooking of France. Chronicle Books. ISBN 978-1-4521-0767-7.
- Wright, Clifford A. (1 January 2003). Little Foods of the Mediterranean: 500 Fabulous Recipes for Antipasti, Tapas, Hors D'Oeuvre, Meze, and More. Harvard Common Press. ISBN 978-1-55832-227-1.
- Wyk, Magdaleen Van; Barton, Pat (2007). Traditional South African Cooking. Struik. ISBN 978-1-77007-407-1.
