= Cocktail party =

Event at which cocktails are served

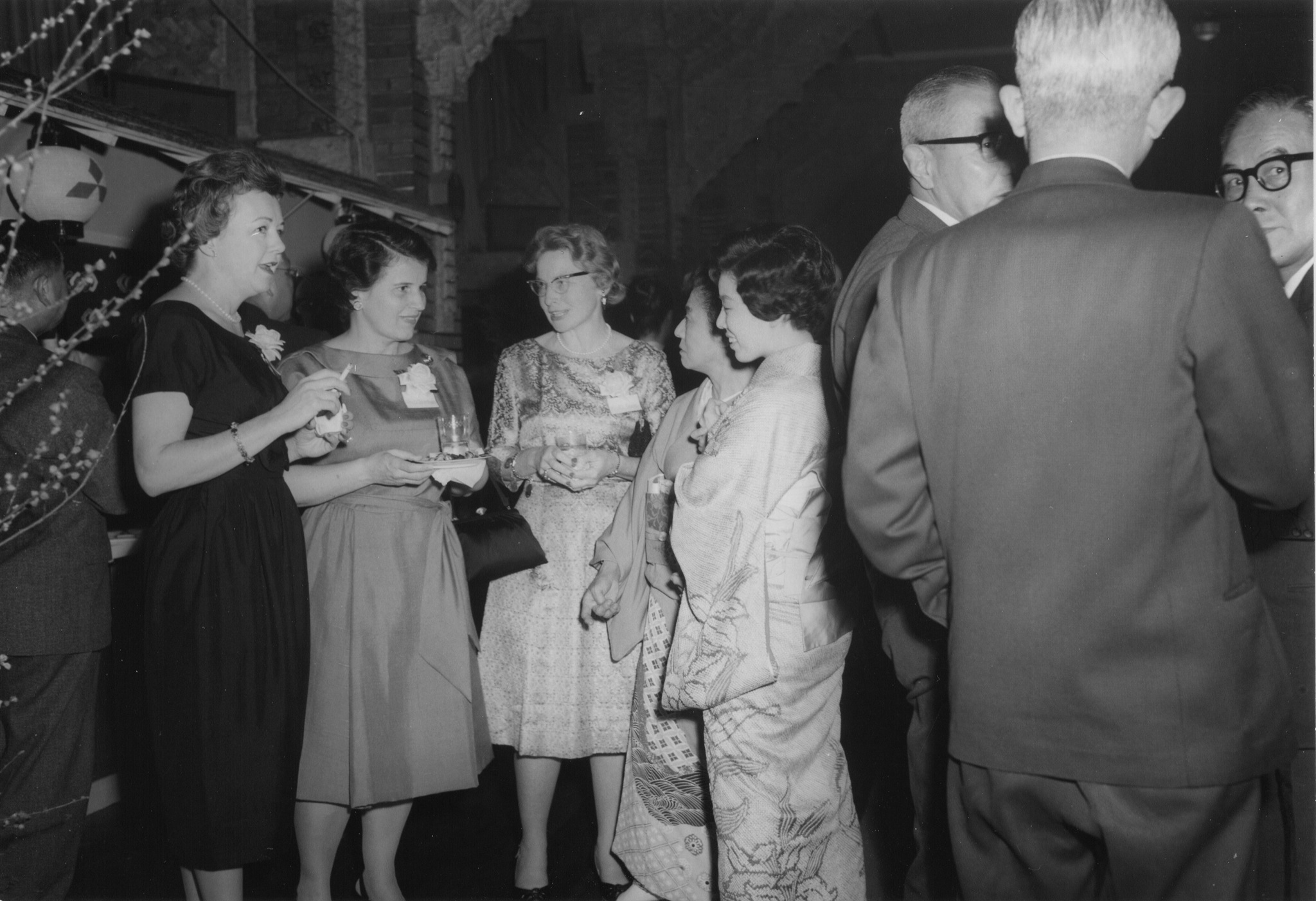
A cocktail party at the Imperial Hotel, Tokyo, Japan, March 13, 1961.

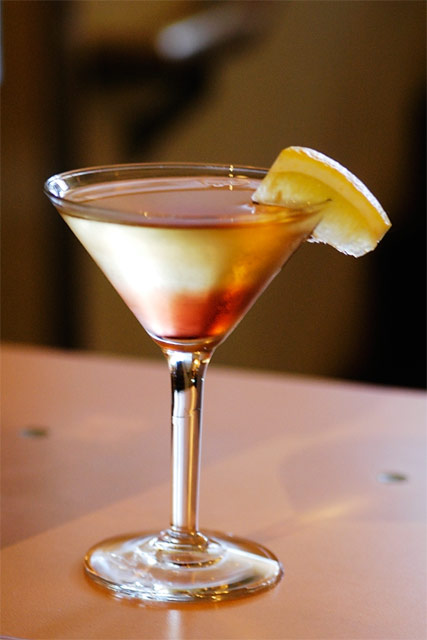
A typical cocktail, served in a cocktail glass.

A cocktail party is a party at which cocktails are served. It is sometimes called a cocktail reception. A cocktail party organized for purposes of social or business networking is called a mixer.

Some events, such as wedding receptions, are preceded by a cocktail hour. During the cocktail hour, guests socialize while drinking and eating appetizers. Organizers of these events use the cocktail hour to occupy guests between related events and to reduce the number of guests who arrive late.

Although it has been said that the inventor of the cocktail party was Alec Waugh of London, an article in the St. Paul Pioneer Press in May 1917 credited its invention to Mrs. Julius S. Walsh Jr. of St. Louis, Missouri. Mrs. Walsh invited 50 guests to her house on a Sunday at high noon for a one-hour affair. "The party scored an instant hit," the newspaper declared, stating that within weeks cocktail parties had become "a St. Louis institution".

Alec Waugh noted that the first cocktail party in England was hosted in 1924 by war artist Christopher Nevinson.

German author Walter Leonhardt advised readers to observe "three fundamental rules" of cocktail parties, in a 1962 book on culture and customs of England:

1. It should not last long, an hour and a half maximum, the time one can stand up, even if there are chairs for weaker constitutions.
2. Guests should enter and leave freely, avoiding elaborate greetings on arrival and departure.
3. Conversation must avoid passionate subjects (personal, political or religious topics) to keep a harmonious and cheerful ambiance.

== See also ==
- Hors d'oeuvre § In the United States
- The Cocktail Party, a play by T. S. Eliot
