= Fanny Cradock =

English restaurant critic, television cook and writer (1909–1994)

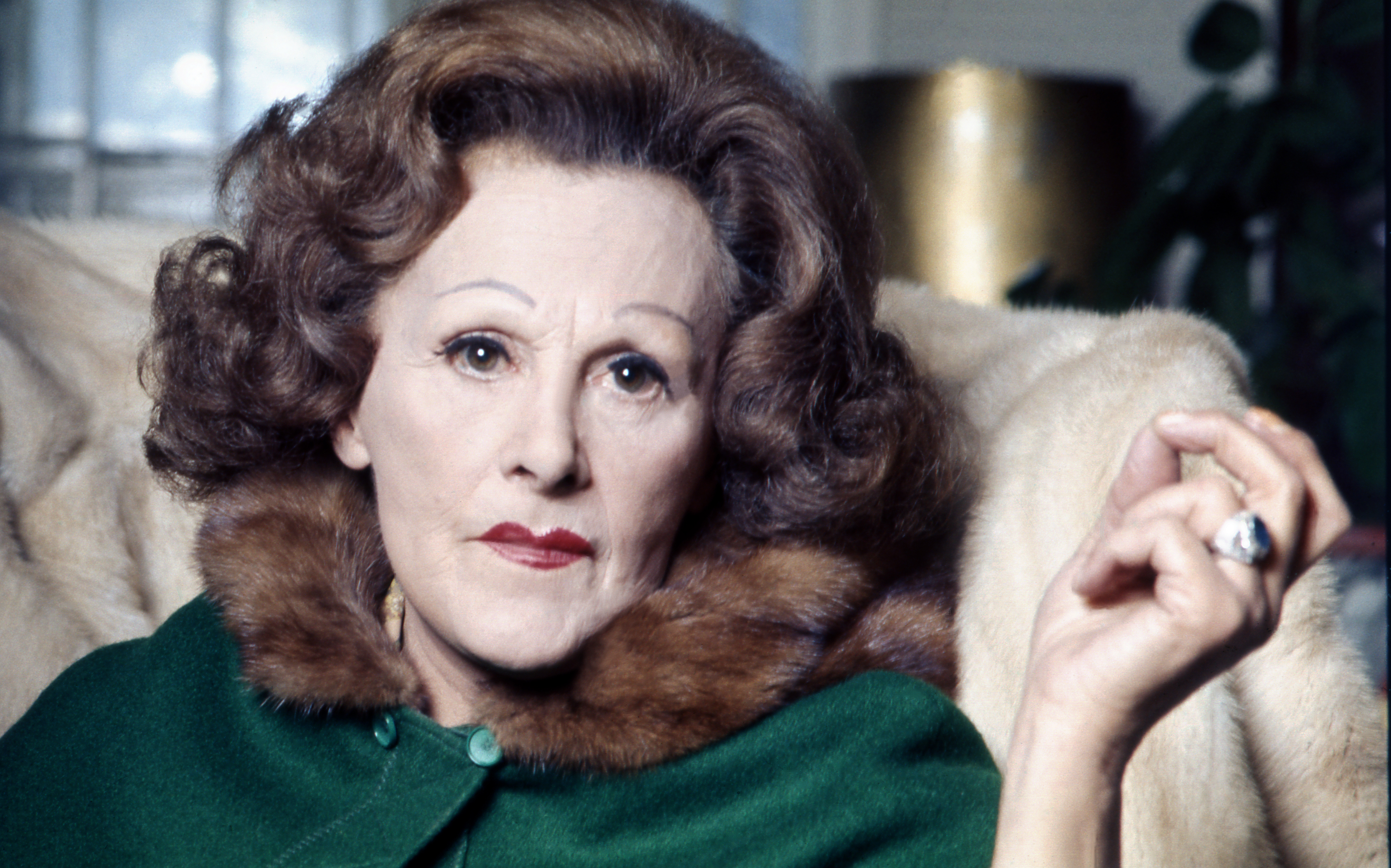
- Cradock in 1976
- Born: Phyllis Nan Sortain Primrose-Pechey; 26 February 1909; Leytonstone, Essex, England
- Died: 27 December 1994 (aged 85); Hailsham, East Sussex, England
- Occupations: Television cook, novelist and food critic
- Spouses: Sidney A. Vernon Evans (m. 1926; died 1927); Arthur W. Chapman (m. 1928; died 1978)
- Partner: Johnnie Cradock (1939 – 1987; his death)
- Children: 2
- Parents: Archibald Thomas Pechey; Bijou Sortain Hancock

Phyllis Nan Sortain Primrose-Pechey (26 February 1909 – 27 December 1994), better known as Fanny Cradock, was an English restaurant critic, television cook and writer. She frequently appeared on television, at cookery demonstrations and in print with her long-term partner, Major Johnnie Cradock, who played the part of a slightly bumbling hen-pecked husband.

== Early life ==
Cradock was born at her maternal grandparents' house, 33 Fairlop Road, Leytonstone, Essex. The birth was recorded in the registration district of West Ham.

Until the age of 10 Cradock lived with her grandparents at Fairlop Road. A plaque (with her name misspelt) can be found at Fairwood Court, Fairlop Road, London E11: "Fanny Craddock 1909–1994. On this site until 1930 stood a house called Apthorp, birthplace of the famous TV cookery expert Fanny Craddock; born Phyllis Pechey."

Her birthplace was named after Apthorp Villa, in Bath, Somerset, where her grandfather Charles Hancock had been born. Cradock's parents did not manage their money well; her mother, Bijou, spent extravagantly, and her father, Archibald Thomas Pechey, had sizeable gambling debts, many run up in Nice. In attempting to keep their creditors at bay, the family moved around the country, going to Herne Bay in Kent, then to Swanage in Dorset and on to Bournemouth in Dorset, where Archibald's brother, Richard Francis Pechey (1872–1963), had become the Vicar of Holy Trinity Church in 1912. While in Bournemouth the 15-year-old Fanny attended Bournemouth High School (now Talbot Heath School).

Archibald moved the family again to Wroxham in Norfolk, around 1927, where his creditors caught up with him, and by 1930 he was appearing in Norfolk's bankruptcy court faced with debts of £3,500. Cradock began the next ten years of her life in London living in destitution, selling cleaning products door to door. She then worked in a dressmaking shop.

== Culinary career ==
Cradock's fortunes began to change when she started work at various restaurants and was introduced to the works of Auguste Escoffier. She later wrote passionately about the change from service à la française to service à la russe and hailed Escoffier as a saviour of British cooking.

Fanny and Johnnie Cradock began writing a column under the pen name of "Bon Viveur" which appeared in The Daily Telegraph from 1950 to 1955. This sparked a theatre career, with the pair turning theatres into restaurants. Cradock would cook vast dishes that were served to the audience. They became known for their roast turkey, complete with stuffed head, tail feathers and wings. Complete with French accents, their act was one of a drunken hen-pecked husband and a domineering wife. At this time, they were known as Major and Mrs Cradock. She also wrote books under the names Frances Dale, Bon Viveur, Susan Leigh and Phyllis Cradock.

== TV personality ==
In 1955 Cradock recorded a pilot for what became a very successful BBC television series on cookery. Each year the BBC published a booklet giving a detailed account of every recipe she demonstrated, allowing her to frequently say in later years, "You'll find that recipe in the booklet, so I won't show you now." Cradock advocated bringing Escoffier-standard food into the British home and gave every recipe a French name. Her food looked extravagant, but was generally cost-effective, and she seemed to care about her audience. Her catchphrases included "This won't break you", "This is perfectly economical", and "This won't stretch your purse". When presenting her Christmas cake recipe she once justified the cost of ingredients, saying "But on the other hand, we do want one piece of decent cake in the year."

As time went by, however, her food began to seem outdated, with her love of the piping bag and vegetable dyes. As she grew older, she applied more and more make-up and wore vast chiffon ballgowns on screen. Cradock had always included relatives and friends in her television shows. Johnnie suffered a minor heart attack in the early 1970s and was replaced with the daughter of a friend, Jayne. Another assistant was Sarah, and there was a series of young men who did not last long.

Throughout her television career, the Cradocks also worked for the Gas Council, appearing at trade shows such as the Ideal Home Exhibition and making many "infomercials", instructing cooks, usually newlywed women, on how to use gas cookers for basic dishes. Despite the BBC's ban on advertising, Cradock used only gas stoves in her television shows and often stated that she "hated" electric stoves and ovens.

Her series Fanny Cradock Cooks for Christmas is the only one out of several she made to have survived in the TV archives and to have been repeated in recent years, on the UK channels BBC Four, Good Food and Food Network UK, usually in the run-up to Christmas. Good Food also occasionally broadcasts Fanny Cradock Invites You to a Cheese and Wine Party, one of a few surviving stand-alone episodes from other series.

Cradock appeared in twenty-four television series between 1955 and 1975.

== Career decline ==
In 1976 Gwen Troake, a farmer's wife from Devon, won the Cook of the Realm competition, leading to the BBC selecting her for its TV series The Big Time, where talented amateurs were given the opportunity to take part in a spectacular professional event. Troake was to organise a three-course Foyles' Literary Lunch at The Dorchester in honour of the former prime minister Edward Heath, with Lord Mountbatten and other dignitaries in attendance, and asked Cradock—by then a tax exile in Ireland—along with chef Eugene Kaufeler, actor and gourmet Robert Morley, nutritionist Magnus Pyke and many other experts Troake admired to advise her.

The result brought about the demise of Cradock's television career. Troake went through her menu of seafood cocktail, duckling with a lemon-jelly-and-cornstarch fortified bramble sauce and coffee cream dessert with rum. Her idea was that with seafood, water fowl and rum, the meal had a nautical theme, which would appeal to Heath's love of sailing and also be an appropriate salute to the former Admiral Mountbatten. Cradock, grimacing and acting as if on the verge of gagging, told Troake that her menu was far too rich and she would "never in a million years" serve a seafood cocktail before duck. She appeared not to be familiar with the term "bramble", and when told it meant a blackberry, was horrified that it would be paired with a savoury duck, remonstrated that a sauce like that should be brushed on a flan. She derisively declared that the jam in it was "too English" and that the English had never had a cuisine, erroneously claiming that "Yorkshire pudding came from Burgundy". While accepting that Troake's dessert was delicious, she insisted that it was not suitable, as it was "too sickly" served after the sweetly sauced, rich duck, countering Troake's numerous objections with "Yes, dear, but now you're among professionals."

Cradock suggested that unless Troake were to serve salad and cheese afterwards, as is done in France, then she should use small almond pastry barquettes filled with a palate-cleansing fruit sorbet with spun sugar sails, as this was equally suitable for the naval theme. Troake kept insisting that she liked her signature coffee pudding with "nautical" rum in it, while Cradock appealed to her to think of her diners' taste buds and stomachs, and try to achieve a balance in her menu. Unfortunately, the replacement dessert was not executed properly, and Morley said he felt that Troake's original coffee pudding was perfect.

The public were incensed at Cradock's eye-rolling rudeness and condescension, and felt that she had ruined Troake's moment. The Daily Telegraph wrote "Not since 1940 can the people of England have risen in such unified wrath". Cradock wrote a letter of apology to Troake, but the BBC terminated her contract two weeks after the broadcast of the programme. She would never again present a cookery programme for the BBC. (Troake, by contrast, published Gwen Troake's Country Cookbook of recipes the following year; it included the bramble sauce as well as the coffee cream dessert Cradock had vetoed.) Speaking about the incident on Room 101 in 1999, The Big Time's producer Esther Rantzen described Cradock as "hell on wheels", and that she had "reduced this poor little lady [Troake] to nothing".

== Final years ==
Fanny and Johnnie Cradock spent their final years living at Bexhill-on-Sea, East Sussex. They became regulars on the chat show circuit, and appeared on programmes such as The Generation Game and Blankety Blank. Fanny appeared alone on Wogan, Parkinson and TV-am. Her final BBC appearance and her final television appearance was in early 1988 on Windmill, presented by Chris Serle.

== Personal life ==
Cradock was legally married twice; two later marriages were bigamous and therefore void ab initio. First, she married Sidney A. Vernon Evans on 10 October 1926 in Sheppey, Kent; she was 17 and he was 22. Cradock married as "Phyllis Nan Primrose Pechey"; "Primrose Pechey" was a form passed down her father's side. Sidney Evans died in a plane crash on 4 February 1927, leaving her pregnant with their son Peter Vernon Evans, who was raised by his paternal grandparents. Thanks to Johnnie Cradock, Peter later became a sous-chef at the Dorchester.

By July of the following year, Cradock had become pregnant again, and married the baby's father, Arthur William Chapman, on 23 July, in Norwich, Norfolk. For this marriage, Cradock gave her name as "Phyllis Nan Sortain Vernon Evans".

The couple had a son, Christopher, but their marriage lasted less than a year before they separated. Cradock left her son Christopher and husband Arthur for a new life in central London. Christopher was brought up in Norfolk by his father, an aunt and grandmother, although he made contact with Fanny in his adult life. Arthur Chapman became a Catholic and so would not give Fanny the divorce she later requested, as it was against the church's teachings. He was given only a single line in Fanny's autobiography, Something's Burning.

Cradock married again on 26 September 1939 in Fulham, London, as "Phyllis Nan Sortain Chapman"; her husband this time was Gregory Holden-Dye, a daredevil minor racing driver, driving Bentleys at Brooklands in Surrey. The marriage lasted only eight weeks, and produced no children, as she had soon met the love of her life, Johnnie Cradock. Gregory's mother had expressed a low opinion of Fanny, and ended up as a loathsome character in Fanny's first novel Scorpion's Suicide. Cradock later concluded that as Arthur Chapman had not granted her a divorce, her marriage to Gregory was not lawful, and so never publicised it.

John Whitby "Johnnie" Cradock was a major in the Royal Artillery who was already married with four children. He soon left his wife, Ethel, and children to be with Fanny. Unable to marry Johnnie, because of Arthur's refusal to get divorced, she changed her surname to Cradock by deed poll in 1942. When she was misinformed that Arthur had died, she married Johnnie on 7 May 1977. (Arthur actually lived until 1978.) For this marriage Cradock went with a pared-down version of her name ("Phyllis Chapman"), and the then-68-year-old recorded her age as 55 on the marriage certificate, even though she had a son who was nearly fifty.

From the late 1960s to the early 1970s the Cradocks were living at The Dower House, Grove Mill Lane, near Watford in Hertfordshire, presenting cookery shows from the kitchen. They sold the house in 1974. Johnnie died in Basingstoke, Hampshire, on 30 January 1987.

== Death ==
Cradock died following a stroke, on 27 December 1994, at the Ersham House Nursing Home, Hailsham, East Sussex. The cause of death was given as 'cerebrovascular atherosclerosis'. She was cremated at Langney Crematorium, Eastbourne, as Johnnie had been when he died in 1987. There is a memorial plaque and a rosebush in the grounds of the crematorium for both of them.

== Legacy ==
Cradock came to the attention of the public in the postwar-utility years, trying to inspire the average housewife with an exotic approach to cooking. She worked in various ball-gowns without the customary cook's apron, averring that women should feel cooking was easy and enjoyable, rather than messy and intimidating.

In her early anonymous role as a food critic, working with Johnnie under the name of 'Bon Viveur', Cradock introduced the public to unusual dishes from France and Italy, popularising the pizza in the United Kingdom. She and Johnnie worked together on a touring cookery show, sponsored by the Gas Council, to show how gas could be used easily in the kitchen and, as their fame increased, her shows transferred to television, where she enjoyed 20 years of success.

Cradock has also been credited in the UK as the originator of the prawn cocktail. However, some have suggested that she popularised her version of an established dish that was not well known until then in Britain. In their 1997 book The Prawn Cocktail Years, Simon Hopkinson and Lindsey Bareham note that the prawn cocktail has a "direct lineage to Escoffier".

In the course of her shows, Cradock made frequent concessions to the economic realities of the era, suggesting cheaper alternatives which would be within reach of the housewife's purse. The BBC published her recipes and suggestions for dinner-parties in a series of booklets, consolidating her reputation as the foremost celebrity chef of her day. Despite their extravagant appearance and eccentricity, her recipes were extremely widely used and her cookery books sold in record numbers.

Marguerite Patten described Fanny Cradock as the saviour of British cooking after the war. Brian Turner has said that he respects Fanny's career, and Delia Smith has attributed her own career to early inspirations taken from the Cradocks' television programmes. In a 2008 interview with The Daily Star, singer Amy Winehouse said that she discovered a love of cookery after reading Cradock's books. Others are less complimentary. The BBC series The Way We Cooked featured an episode dedicated to Cradock, in which Graham Kerr, Keith Floyd and Hugh Fearnley-Whittingstall, amongst others, disparaged her methods and cooking skills. In the third series of The F Word, Gordon Ramsay held a series-long search for a new Fanny Cradock.

== Media portrayals ==
Fanny Cradock's husky voice and theatrical style was ripe for mimicry, such as Betty Marsden's 'Fanny Haddock' in two BBC Radio comedy shows, Beyond Our Ken (1958–1964) and Round the Horne (1965–1968). Fanny and Johnnie were also parodied by The Two Ronnies and on The Benny Hill Show, with Hill as Fanny and Bob Todd as an invariably drunk Johnnie.

Cradock's life has also been the subject of the plays Doughnuts Like Fanny's by Julia Darling and Fear of Fanny by Brian Fillis. After a successful run by the Leeds Library Theatre Company, touring the United Kingdom in October and November 2003, Fear of Fanny was turned into a television drama starring Julia Davis as Cradock and Mark Gatiss as Johnnie and featuring Hayley Atwell in a supporting role. The production broadcast in October 2006 on BBC Four as one of a series of culinary-themed dramas.

Sucking Shrimp by Stephanie Theobald has Fanny Cradock as one of its central characters. To provincial Cornish heroine Rosa Barge, Cradock represents glamour, sophistication and the life she aspires to in her concoctions of a Taj Mahal out of Italian meringue and duchesse potato dyed vivid green.

In 2019 the cabaret group 'Duckie' staged Duckie Loves Fanny as part of the London Borough of Waltham Forest's programme of events marking the locale's year-long status as London Borough of Culture. Members of the cabaret group described their performance as a "very queer mashup of postwar pop culture, style, food and gender politics in honour of the fearsome TV cook in her home area of Leytonstone".
