= Ian Craddock =

Ian Craddock graduated with a 1st class BEng in Electronic and Communications Engineering from the University of Bristol in 1992, followed by a PhD in electromagnetics in 1995.

Appointed to a lectureship at Bristol his early career comprised modelling microwave antenna structures before taking on leadership of a research project to design a radar device for humanitarian demining, inspired by multistatic radar focussing principles first developed by Professor Ralph Benjamin. The culmination of several years as principal investigator of this project was a working prototype radar which was trialled at outdoor test sites in the UK and Italy.

Approached by Professor Alan Preece, then Head of Medical Physics at the Bristol Royal Infirmary, they began to explore whether similar methods could be used to detect tumours in breast tissue. Ian Craddock led the University team, which included Professor Ralph Benjamin, to first model and then build successive prototypes of a radar-based breast imaging system. Ian was principal investigator of two EPSRC grants on this topic (grant references EP/G003084/1 and EP/J00717X/1) and was a winner of the IEE (now IET) J. A. Lodge prize for "outstanding work in Medical Electronics". In 2005 Ian, Alan and Roy Johnson spun Micrima Ltd out of the University, in order to bring a clinical breast cancer diagnostic device to market - Micrima took the device "MARIA" (named after Ian's wife) through regulatory approval and on to market.

In 2013 Ian was PI of the £11.8M EPSRC-funded SPHERE project (grant EP/K031910/1) and in 2018 became Director of the EPSRC Centre for Doctoral Training in Digital Health and Care (training grant EP/S023704/1), both in Bristol.

He is a Chartered Engineer, Fellow of the IET, Fellow of the Alan Turing Institute and named Fellow of the Institute of Electrical and Electronics Engineers (IEEE) in 2016 for leadership in imaging for healthcare applications.
