= Caradec =

Origin
- Meaning: amiable from karadek
- Region of origin: Brittany

Other names
- Variant forms: Caradec'h, Carradec, Caradeuc

Caradec is a Breton-language surname (the name Karadeg means "beloved, amiable"). Notable people with the surname include:

- Loïc Caradec, French engineer
- Mickaël Caradec, French footballer
- Jean-Michel Caradec'h, French journalist and writer

== See also ==
- Craddock (surname)
