= Stuart Cradock =

English cricketer (born 1949)

Stuart Cradock (born 14 September 1949) was an English cricketer. A right-handed batsman and right-arm medium-fast bowler, he played for Hertfordshire. He was born in Hertford.

Cradock, who represented Hertfordshire in the Minor Counties Championship between 1973 and 1980, made a single List A appearance for the team, during the 1976 season. From the tailend, Cradock scored three not out with the bat, and conceded 35 runs from 12 overs with the ball.
