= HMS Caradoc =

Two ships of the Royal Navy have borne the name HMS Caradoc, after Caradoc, a semi-legendary figure in Welsh history, or other figures of this name:

- HMS Caradoc (1847) was an iron paddle gunboat launched in 1847 and sold in 1870.
- HMS Caradoc (D60) was a C-class light cruiser launched in 1916. She became a base ship in 1944 and was scrapped in 1946.
