= Barquette =

Pastry shell in the shape of a boat

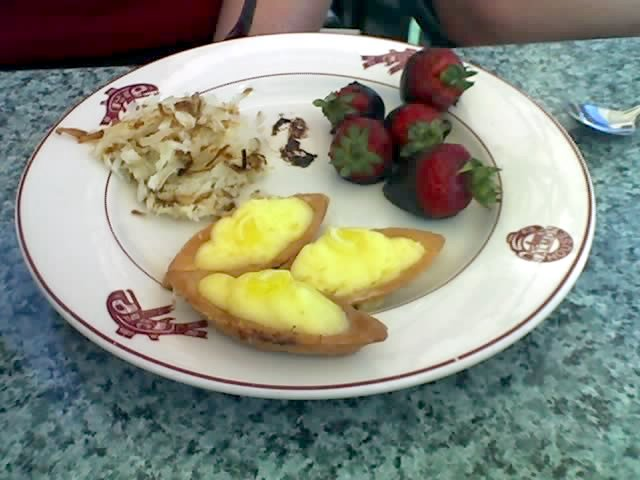
Barquette, served as brunch dessert

A barquette is a pastry shell in the shape of a boat containing either a savory or sweet filling. Barquettes may be served as an hors d'oeuvre or as a dessert.

Examples of barquette fillings include fruit, vegetables, custard, or smoked salmon.

== History and etymology ==
The word barquette is a diminutive of the French word barque, meaning ship.

The first known use of the word was in 1881.
