= Craddock Moor stone circle =

Stone circle on Bodmin Moor, Cornwall, England

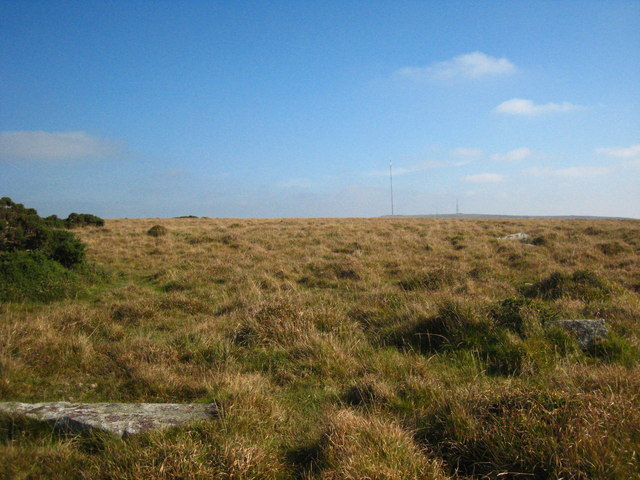

- Location within Cornwall
- 50.5199°N 4.4717°W
- Type: Stone circle
- Periods: Bronze Age
- Location: Bodmin Moor, Cornwall

Craddock Moor Stone Circle or Craddock Moor Circle is a stone circle located near Minions on Bodmin Moor in Cornwall, UK. It is situated around half a mile Northwest of The Hurlers.

== Description ==
The circle consists of sixteen fallen stones with one remaining possible stump, all considerably overgrown making it one of the harder circles to find on the moor. John Barnatt has suggested that the circle was situated so that the summit of Brown Willy marked the midsummer sunset.

It is nearby to Craddock Moor stone row and an embanked enclosure. Christopher Tilley noted what he called a "possible axis of movement" linking the stone row, an embanked enclosure, the circle and the Hurlers. As these cannot be seen from each other, he commented "It is difficult to imagine how such a striking alignment could occur purely by chance."

== Archaeology ==
One of the first archaeological surveys of Bodmin Moor, including Craddock Moor Circle was carried out c. 1800 by Nicholas Johnson and Peter Rose.

== Folklore ==
Chris Barber and David Pykitt suggested that Craddock Moor is named after the ancient British King of Arthurian legend Caradoc who has been linked to the Pendragon Caractacus who fought the Romans.

== Literature ==
- William Borlase (1754). Observations on the antiquities, historical and monumental, of the county of Cornwall ...: Consisting of several essays on the first inhabitants, Druid-superstition, customs, and remains of the most remote antiquity, in Britain, and the British Isles ... With a summary of the religious, civil, and military state of Cornwall before the Norman Conquest ... Printed by W. Jackson, in the High-Strand.
- William Copeland Borlase (1872). Naenia Cornubiae: the cromlechs and tumuli of Cornwall. Llanerch. ISBN 978-1-897853-36-8.
- William C. Lukis (1885). The prehistoric stone monuments of the British Isles: Cornwall. Printed for Nichols and Sons for the Society of Antiquaries.
- Aubrey Burl (2005). A guide to the stone circles of Britain, Ireland and Brittany. Yale University Press. ISBN 978-0-300-11406-5.
