= Johnnie Cradock =

English television chef, food writer (1904–1987)

- Born: John Whitby Cradock; 17 May 1904; Lambeth, London, England
- Died: 30 January 1987 (aged 82); Basingstoke, Hampshire, England
- Occupations: Major, British Army
- Known for: Cookery
- Partner: Fanny Cradock (from 1939 to his death)

Major John Whitby Cradock (17 May 1904 – 30 January 1987) was an English cook, writer and broadcaster and the long-term partner of television cook and writer Fanny Cradock.

== Biography ==
Cradock was born in Lambeth, London on 17 May 1904.

He attended Harrow School. In 1923 he was commissioned from the Inns of Court Officers' Training Corps into the Territorial Army as a second lieutenant in the 52nd (London) Anti-Aircraft Brigade, Royal Garrison Artillery. He was promoted to lieutenant in 1925, captain on 30 October 1930, and major on 30 October 1935. In 1943 he was awarded the Efficiency Decoration for twenty years' service. He remained on the Territorial Army Reserve of Officers until 27 November 1954.

He is best remembered as being the long-suffering stooge for his wife in their popular British cooking programmes which were shown from the 1950s to the 1970s. Wearing a traditional blazer and sporting a monocle, he would remain around the back of Fanny's studio sets awaiting her imperious commands which, when they came, often resulted in his being berated for being too slow.

With his wife, he wrote a number of popular cookery books. Johnnie and Fanny also wrote the "Bon Viveur" restaurant column for The Daily Telegraph newspaper from 1950 to 1955. This was one of Britain's first restaurant columns and led to their first television series in 1955.

At first they presented the BBC's Kitchen Magic, but were soon poached by ITV's first cooking programme, which they presented as Fanny & Johnnie.

Johnnie and Fanny were not married but Fanny adopted his name for their writing and television work. They participated in a marriage ceremony in 1977 but the marriage was in fact bigamous and invalid as Fanny was still married to her second husband.

He died in Basingstoke, Hampshire on 30 January 1987.

== Television filmography ==
- Chez Bon Viveur
- Cradock Cooks for Christmas
- Dinner Party
- Fanny Cradock Invites
- Fanny's Kitchen
- The Cradocks

== Publications (with Fanny Cradock) ==
- Something's Burning: The Autobiography of Two Cooks (1960)
- The Daily Telegraph Cook's Book by Bon Viveur (1964) ISBN 0-00-611940-9
- Fanny & Johnnie Cradock's Cook Hostess' Book (1970) ISBN 0-00-435151-7
- Fanny & Johnnie Cradock's Freezer Book (1978) ISBN 0-491-02313-8
- Fanny & Johnnie's Cook's Essential Alphabet (1979) ISBN 0-491-02307-3

== Media portrayals ==
Johnnie Cradock's style of dress, his love of wine, and the on-screen "hen-pecked" relationship he shared with Fanny were all ripe for mimicry. Both Fanny and Johnnie were parodied by The Two Ronnies and on The Benny Hill Show, with Bob Todd as an invariably drunk Johnnie serving as a foil to Benny Hill's portrayal of Fanny.

Fear of Fanny, a television drama on the career of the Cradocks, based on the stage show by Brian Fillis was broadcast in October 2006 on BBC Four as one of a series of culinary-themed dramas. Johnnie Cradock was portrayed by Mark Gatiss.
