= Windmill (TV series) =

British television series

Windmill was a British television series, usually shown on Sunday lunchtimes on BBC2, which ran from 26 August 1985 to 3 April 1988, presented by Chris Serle, its name taken from the BBC television archives being housed at Windmill Road in West London at the time. It was one of the first shows fully to exploit the potential of the BBC's archive, showing during its run hundreds of television clips from the 1940s to the 1980s, always based around a specific theme. Among the many shows represented were The Morecambe and Wise Show, Monty Python's Flying Circus, The Sky at Night, Whicker's World, Nationwide, Doctor Who, Steptoe and Son, Blue Peter, and the original 1950s Watch with Mother series. A number of clips were also shown from the television newsreels of the late 1940s.

Weekly features included a regular "Comedy Classic", always fitting with each episode's theme, and "All Your Own Work", which featured films made in the past by members of the public (often those included in earlier BBC series such as Caught in Time and Everybody's Doing It). Each edition also featured a studio guest, who would pick their favourites from the archives and whose own appearances would usually also be shown; Richard Stilgoe, for example, chose a clip from Jack Rosenthal's play The Evacuees, fitting in with the episode's "Childhood" theme, and a clip from his own series And Now the Good News was shown.

From 4 December 1988 the series was replaced by Boxpops, another archive-based series but much faster-paced and pop-orientated with no studio presenter.

== Episode guide ==
- Bank Holidays (pilot episode, 26 August 1985, guest Ruth Madoc)
- House and Home (3 November 1985, repeat 28 March 1986, guest Jan Francis)
- Art (10 November 1985, repeat 29 March 1986)
- Animals (17 November 1985, repeat 30 March 1986, guest Johnny Morris)
- Night (24 November 1985, repeat 11 October 1987)
- Body (1 December 1985, repeat 1 April 1986, guest Bonnie Langford)
- Time (8 December 1985, repeat 2 April 1986)
- Love and Romance (15 December 1985, repeat 3 April 1986)
- Christmas (22 December 1985, repeat 21 December 1986, guests John Craven and chorister Jeremy Unwin)
- Food (29 December 1985, repeat 31 March 1986, guest Magnus Pyke)
- Transport (5 January 1986, repeat 4 January 1987)
- Childhood (12 January 1986, repeat 18 October 1987, guest Richard Stilgoe)
- Water (19 January 1986, repeat 28 December 1986)
- Abroad (26 January 1986, repeat 7 December 1986)
- The Planet Earth (16 November 1986, repeat 1 November 1987)
- War and Peace (23 November 1986)
- The Sea and Ships (30 November 1986, repeat 15 November 1987)
- Music (11 January 1987, repeat 25 October 1987)
- Sport and Achievement (18 January 1987, repeat 22 November 1987), guest Frank Bough
- Flight (25 January 1987, repeat 29 November 1987)
- Hands (6 December 1987)
- Families (13 December 1987)
- Journeys (20 December 1987, guest Michael Palin)
- The Countryside (3 January 1988)
- Cars (10 January 1988, repeated 6 November 1988, guest Murray Walker, and James Hunt)
- Skill (17 January 1988)
- Money (24 January 1988, repeated 30 October 1988), guest Valerie Singleton
- The United States of America (scheduled for 31 January 1988, postponed to 3 April 1988, repeat 27 November 1988, guest Jonathan King)

Other repeats (episodes not specified in Radio Times) were on 4 April 1986, 9 October 1988, 16 October 1988 and 23 October 1988.
