= List of hors d'oeuvre =

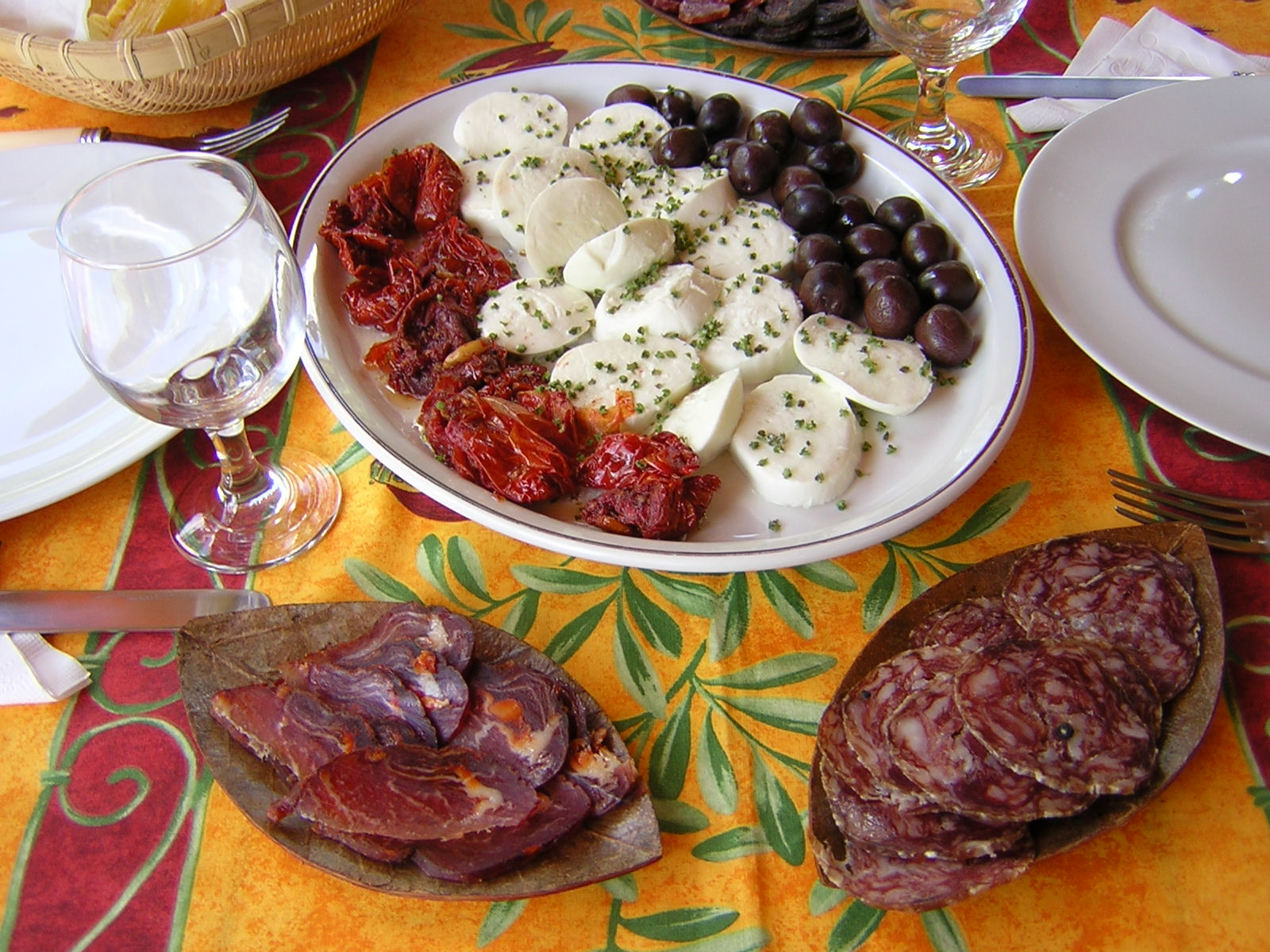
Some hors d'oeuvre: mozzarella cheese sprinkled with basil flowers, black Greek olives, sun-dried tomatoes, salami and Spanish Lomo Ibérico

This is a list of notable hors d'oeuvre, also referred to as appetizers or starters, which may be served either hot or cold. They are food items served before the main courses of a meal, and are also sometimes served at the dinner table as a part of a meal. Many cultures serve dips, such as baba ghanoush, chili con queso, hummus, and tzatziki with bread or vegetables as hors d'oeuvre.

If the period between when guests arrive and when the meal is eaten (for example during a cocktail hour) is extended these might also serve the purpose of sustaining guests during the wait, in the same way that apéritifs are served as a drink before meals. Hors d'oeuvre are sometimes served with no meal afterward; this is the case with many reception and cocktail party events.

== Hors d'oeuvre ==
Name	Image	Origin	Description
Angels on horseback		England	Oysters wrapped in bacon, served hot: In the United Kingdom, they can also be a savoury, the final course of a traditional British formal meal. They are somewhat similar to devils on horseback and the Midwestern version of pigs in a blanket, a traditional dish of the American Midwest.
Antipasto		Italy	The traditional first course of a formal Italian meal: Traditional antipasto includes cured meats, olives, peperoncini, mushrooms, anchovies, artichoke hearts, various cheeses (such as provolone or mozzarella), and pickled meats and vegetables (both in oil or in vinegar).
Arab salad		Middle East	Any of a variety of salad dishes that form part of Arab cuisine
Bakwan		Indonesia	A vegetable fritter snack—fried meal consisting of vegetables and batter. The ingredients are vegetables; usually beansprouts, shredded cabbages and carrots, battered and deep fried in cooking oil
Barbajuan		Monaco	An appetizer mainly found in the eastern part of French Riviera and Northern Italy, a barbajuan is a fritter filled with Swiss chard, spinach, and ricotta cheese, among other ingredients.
Batagor		Indonesia	A traditional dumpling consisting of fried fish dumplings, usually served with peanut sauce. This appetizer usually served with fried tofu and finger-shaped fried otak-otak fish cakes.
Batata vada		India	A popular Indian vegetarian fast food in Maharashtra, India, it literally means "potato fritters". The Marathi word batata means potato in English. It consists of a potato mash patty coated with chick pea flour, then deep-fried and served hot with savory condiments called chutney. The vada is a disc, around 2 to 3 inches (5.1 to 7.6 cm) in diameter.
Blooming onion		United States	Typically, this consists of one large onion which is cut to resemble a flower, then battered and deep-fried. It is served as an appetizer at some restaurants.
Bruschetta		Italy	An Italian antipasto, its origin dates to at least the 15th century. It consists of grilled bread rubbed with garlic and topped with olive oil, salt, and pepper. It is often topped with tomato.
Buffalo wing		United States	A chicken wing section (wingette or drumette) that is generally deep-fried, unbreaded, and coated in a sauce of vinegar-based cayenne pepper, hot sauce, and butter in the kitchen.
Canapé		France	A small, prepared and usually decorative food, held in the fingers and often eaten in one bite
Caprese salad	Caprese salad	Italy	A salad composed of layers of tomato, mozzarella, and basil, often seasoned with olive oil, balsamic vinegar, salt, and pepper.
Carpaccio		Italy	Raw meat (such as beef, veal, venison, salmon, or tuna), thinly sliced or pounded thin, and served mainly as an appetizer: Pictured is carpaccio with cheese.
Caviar		Iran, Russia	Traditionally, it refers to roe from wild sturgeon in the Caspian and Black Seas. Can also denote roe from American White Sturgeon.
Chaat		India	Chaat is a term describing one of many types of savory snacks, typically served at road-side tracks from stalls or food carts in India.
Charcuterie board		Europe	An assortment of charcuterie (cured meats), and complementary cheeses, fruits, vegetables, nuts, and spreads arranged on a wooden board or stone slab
Cheese and crackers		United Kingdom, North America	Various cheeses and crackers paired together, typically served at parties or gatherings
Chicken fingers		United States	Chicken fingers are prepared by dipping chicken meat in a breading mixture and then deep-frying them. They are typically served with sauce, which can be ketchup, ranch, barbecue or a honey mustard. In North America, they are usually prepared from the breast muscles of chicken.
Chicken lollipop		Indo-Chinese	An hors d'œuvre made from the drumette segments of chicken wings or from drumsticks. The flesh on the segments is pushed to one end of the bone.
Crab puff		United States	Balls of crab meat that have been deep-fried in batter They are often served in restaurants as an appetizer or side dish.
Crab rangoon		United States	These are deep-fried dumplings served in American Chinese, and more recently, Thai restaurants, stuffed with a combination of cream cheese, lightly flaked crab meat (more commonly, canned crab meat or imitation crab meat), with scallions and/or garlic.
Crostini		Italy	Small slices of grilled or toasted bread and toppings, which may include a variety of different cheeses, meats, and vegetables, or may be presented more simply with a brush of olive oil and herbs or a sauce
Crudités		France	Sliced or whole raw vegetables which are sometimes dipped in a vinaigrette or other dipping sauce
Dahi puri		India	An Indian snack which is especially popular in the state of Maharashtra, the dish is a form of chaat and originates from the city of Mumbai. It is served with mini-puri shells (golgappa), which are more popularly recognized from the dish golgappay. Dahi puri and pani puri chaats are often sold by the same vendor.
Dahi vada		India	An Indian chaat prepared by soaking vadas in thick dahi (yogurt). To add more flavor, they may be topped with coriander or mint leaves, chili powder, crushed black pepper, chaat masala, cumin, shredded coconut, green chilis, or boondi.
Deep-fried avocado		California, United States	Also known as avocado fries. Wedges of avocado either breaded or battered and deep fried in oil, seasoned with salt, and served with a dipping sauce
Deviled eggs		England	Boiled eggs, shelled, cut in half, and filled with the yolk mixed with other ingredients such as mayonnaise and mustard, but many other variants exist internationally.
Devils on horseback		England	A hot hors d'oeuvre. The recipes vary, but in general are variations on angels on horseback, made by replacing oysters with dried fruit. The majority of recipes contains a pitted date (though prunes are sometimes used,) stuffed with mango chutney and wrapped in bacon.
Eggplant salads and appetizers		Middle East, Arab culture	Many cuisines feature eggplant salads and appetizers.
Fattoush		The Levant	A Levantine bread salad made from toasted or fried pieces of pita bread (khubz 'arabi) combined with mixed greens and other vegetables, fattoush belongs to the family of dishes known as fattat (plural) or fatta, which use stale flatbread as a base.
Fried mushrooms			Deep-fried mushrooms, they have been dipped in batter. In the United States and some other countries, they are often served as an appetizer or snack.
Garlic knot		United States	A type of garlic bread appetizer, they are found in many pizzerias around the world. They are usually made with pizza dough, and garlic (or garlic powder). They can also be topped with Parmesan cheese, oregano, and/or parsley.
Gravlax		Nordic countries	Raw salmon, cured in salt, sugar, and dill, gravlax is usually served as an appetizer, sliced thinly and accompanied by hovmästarsås (literally "steward sauce", also known as gravlaxsås or rævesovs), a dill and mustard sauce, either on bread of some kind or with boiled potatoes.
Haggis pakora		Scotland	An Indo-Gael fusion food. Haggis (sheep's heart, liver and lungs, onion, oatmeal) is flavored with Indian spices, formed into balls, coated in a batter of gram flour, yogurt and spices, and deep-fried in the same manner as an Indian pakora.
Jalapeño popper		United States	These are jalapeño peppers that have been hollowed out, stuffed with a mixture of cheese, spices, and sometimes ground meat. They are either breaded and deep-fried or wrapped in bacon, and baked or grilled.
Ketoprak		Indonesia	A vegetarian dish consisting of tofu, vegetables, rice cake, and rice vermicelli served in peanut sauce.
Kinilaw		Philippines	A raw seafood dish and preparation method native to the Philippines, prepared using raw cubed fish mixed with vinegar (usually coconut vinegar or cane vinegar) as the primary denaturing agent; along with a souring agent to enhance the tartness like calamansi, dayap, biasong, kamias, tamarind, green mangoes, balimbing, and green sineguelas. It is flavored with salt and spices like black pepper, ginger, onions, and chili peppers (commonly siling labuyo or bird's eye chili).
Kuku sabzi		Iran	Herb kuku, or kuku sabzi in Persian, is the most common type of kuku. It is made of eggs and herbs such as leeks and parsley. Garlic, which is especially popular in the northern regions of Iran, is also used as an ingredient.
Lumpia		Philippines	Various types of spring roll made of thin paper-like or crepe-like pastry skin called "lumpia wrapper" enveloping savory or sweet fillings. It is available in fried or unfried variants.
Malakoff		Switzerland (Romandy)	A fried ball of cheese.
Martabak		Indonesia	A stuffed pancake or pan-fried bread. This appetizer is spicy folded omelette pancake with bits of vegetables, sometimes mixed with green onion and minced meat, made from pan fried crepes which is folded and cut to squares.
Matbucha		Middle East, Arab culture	Tomatoes and roasted bell peppers seasoned with garlic and chili pepper, the name of the dish originates from Arabic and means "cooked [salad]". It is served as an appetizer, often as part of a meze.
Meze		Middle East, Balkans, Caucasus	In Levantine cuisines and in the Caucasus region, meze is served at the beginning of all large-scale meals,
Mozzarella sticks		United States	Elongated pieces of battered or breaded mozzarella
Nachos		Piedras Negras, Coahuila, Mexico	In their simplest form, nachos are tortilla chips (totopos) covered in nacho cheese or shredded cheese and/or salsa.
Obložené chlebíčky		Czech Republic, Slovakia	A Czech and Slovak appetizer or snack, it consists of an open-faced sandwich topped with butter and a variety of other toppings, such as cured meats, fish, hard-boiled egg, and vegetables.
Onion ring		United Kingdom	Generally, it consist of a cross-sectional "ring" of onion (the circular structure of which lends itself well to this method of preparation) dipped in batter or bread crumbs and then deep-fried; a variant is made with onion paste.
Pakora		India	It is created by taking one or two ingredients such as onion, eggplant, potato, spinach, plantain, paneer, cauliflower, tomato, chili pepper, or occasionally bread or chicken and dipping them in a batter of gram flour and then deep-frying them. The most popular varieties are palak pakora, made from spinach, paneer pakora, made from paneer (soft cheese), pyaz pakora, made from onion, and aloo pakora, made from potato.
Paneer tikka		India	Made from chunks of paneer marinated in spices and grilled in a tandoor, it is a vegetarian alternative to chicken tikka and other meat dishes. It is a popular dish that is widely available in India and other countries with an Indian diaspora.
Panipuri		India	A popular street snack in India, Pakistan, Bangladesh, Sri Lanka, and Nepal, it consists of a round, hollow puri, fried crisp, and filled with a mixture of flavored water (pani), tamarind chutney), chili, chaat masala, potato, onion, and chickpeas. It is generally small enough to fit completely into one's mouth. It is a popular street food dish in Mumbai, Delhi, Karachi, Lahore, Dhaka, Kolkata, and Kathmandu.
Papadum		India	A thin, crisp Indian preparation, it is sometimes described as a cracker. It is typically served as an accompaniment to a meal in India. It is also eaten as an appetizer or a snack and can be eaten with various toppings such as chopped onions, chutney, or other dips and condiments.
Papri chaat		India	A Pakistani and North Indian fast food, chaat, an Indo-Aryan word which literally means lick, is used to describe a range of snacks and fast food dishes; papri refers to crisp fried dough wafers made from refined white flour and oil. In papri chaat, the papris are served with boiled potatoes, boiled chick peas, chilis, yogurt, and tamarind chutney, and topped with chaat masala and sev.
Perkedel		Indonesia	Fried patties, made of ground potatoes, minced meat, peeled and ground corn or tofu, or minced fish. Most common perkedel are made from mashed potatoes.
Picada		Argentina and Uruguay	A serving of savory snack and finger foods, including cheeses, cured meats, fermented sausages, olives and peanuts.
Pigs in a blanket		United States and Great Britain	A snack or hors d'oeuvre in a variety of countries consisting of a small sausage wrapped in pastry or bacon.
Pizzetta		Italy	A miniature pizza, it is prepared in a similar fashion, but is only a few inches in diameter.
Poke		United States (Hawaii)	A raw salad served as an hors d'œuvre in Hawaiian cuisine. Modern poke typically consists of cubed ʻahi (yellowfin tuna) sashimi marinated with sea salt, a small amount of soy sauce, inamona (roasted crushed candlenut), sesame oil, limu seaweed, and chopped chili pepper.
Potato skins		United States	Slices of half-circular pieces of potatoes with the skin left on one side and a quarter-inch or so of the inside of the potato on the other, the potato side is covered with toppings such as bacon, cheddar cheese, green onions, and anything else that might be found on a baked potato.
Potato wedges			Wedges of potatoes, often large and unpeeled, that are either baked or fried
Prawn cocktail		United States, United Kingdom	A seafood dish, it consists of "shelled prawns in mayonnaise and tomato dressing, served in a glass", also referred to as a shrimp cocktail.
Pu pu platter		United States	An assortment of small meat and seafood appetizers, a typical pupu platter, as found in American Chinese cuisine, might include an egg roll, spare ribs, chicken wings, chicken fingers, beef teriyaki, skewered beef, fried wontons, crab rangoon, and fried shrimp, among other items, accompanied by a small hibachi grill.
Queso flameado		Mexico, United States (Southwest)	Its typical main ingredients are melted cheese and a characteristic meat sauce of loose fresh chorizo, tomato, onion, chili, and spices.
Rocky Mountain oysters		North America	Bull calf testicles used for human consumption, it is a well-known novelty dish in parts of the American West and Western Canada where cattle ranching is prevalent and castration of young animals is common ("prairie oysters" is the preferred name in Canada, where they may be served in a demi-glace, not deep-fried). In Oklahoma and the Texas Panhandle, they are sometimes called calf fries, but only if taken from very young animals.
Rumaki		mock-Polynesian	Water chestnuts and liver wrapped in bacon (or, as a substitute, either pastrami or cured salted beef [called "beef fry"]) and marinated in a flavored soy sauce
Saganaki		Greece	Various Greek dishes prepared in a small frying pan, itself called a saganaki, they are best-known as being an appetizer of fried cheese.
Sakinalu/chakli		India	A special type of snack, they are prepared in Maharashtra, Karnataka and Telangana, and parts of Guntur District, and are very popular in all districts of Telangana Region. It is essentially made up of rice flour and with small amount of spices, sesame seeds, carom seeds (ajwain), and salt, prepared during Makar Sankranti festival by most people irrespective of caste and creed. Sakinalu are also given to the groom's by the bride's parents for distributing among their relatives and friends.
Salmon tartare			Prepared with fresh raw salmon and seasonings, it is commonly spread on a cracker or artisan-style bread and enjoyed as an appetizer.
Samosa		Middle East, South Asia	This is a fried or baked pastry with a savory filling, such as spiced potatoes, onions, peas, lentils, ground lamb, ground beef, or ground chicken. The size, shape, and consistency may vary, but typically, they are distinctly triangular. Samosas are often accompanied by chutney. They are a popular appetizer or snack in South Asia, Southeast Asia, Central Asia, Southwest Asia, the Arabian Peninsula, the Mediterranean, the Horn of Africa, North Africa, and South Africa.
Serabi		Indonesia	A traditional pancake that is made from rice flour with coconut milk or shredded coconut as an emulsifier. Most of traditional serabi tastes sweet, as the pancake is usually eaten with kinca or thick golden-brownish-colored coconut sugar syrup.
Stuffed mushrooms			Mushrooms filled with a stuffing and baked or broiled
Sushi		Japan	Cooked vinegar-flavored rice combined with other ingredients, the Oxford English Dictionary notes the earliest written mention of sushi in English in an 1893 book, A Japanese Interior, where it mentions sushi as "a roll of cold rice with fish, seaweed, or some other flavoring". However, there is also mention of sushi in a Japanese-English dictionary from 1873, and an 1879 article on Japanese cookery in the journal Notes and Queries.
Tokwa’t baboy		Philippines	A typical Philippine appetizer, it usually includes pork ears, pork belly, and deep-fried tofu, and is dipped in a mixture of soy sauce, pork broth, vinegar, chopped white onions, scallions, and red chili peppers.
Zakuski		Russia	A Russian term for hors d'oeuvres, snacks, and appetizers, it is served before the main course. Usually presented buffet style, it often consists of cold cuts, cured fishes, mixed salads, kholodets, pirozhki, various pickled vegetables (such as tomatoes, beets, or cucumbers), sauerkraut, pickled mushrooms, deviled eggs, hard cheeses, caviar, canapés, open sandwiches, and breads.

== See also ==
- Amuse-bouche
- Banchan
- Cicchetti
- Dim sum
- Finger food
- Garnish
- Gujeolpan
- List of dips
- List of pastries
- Picada
- Smörgåsbord
