= La Josie's =

Mexican restaurant in Seattle, Washington, U.S.

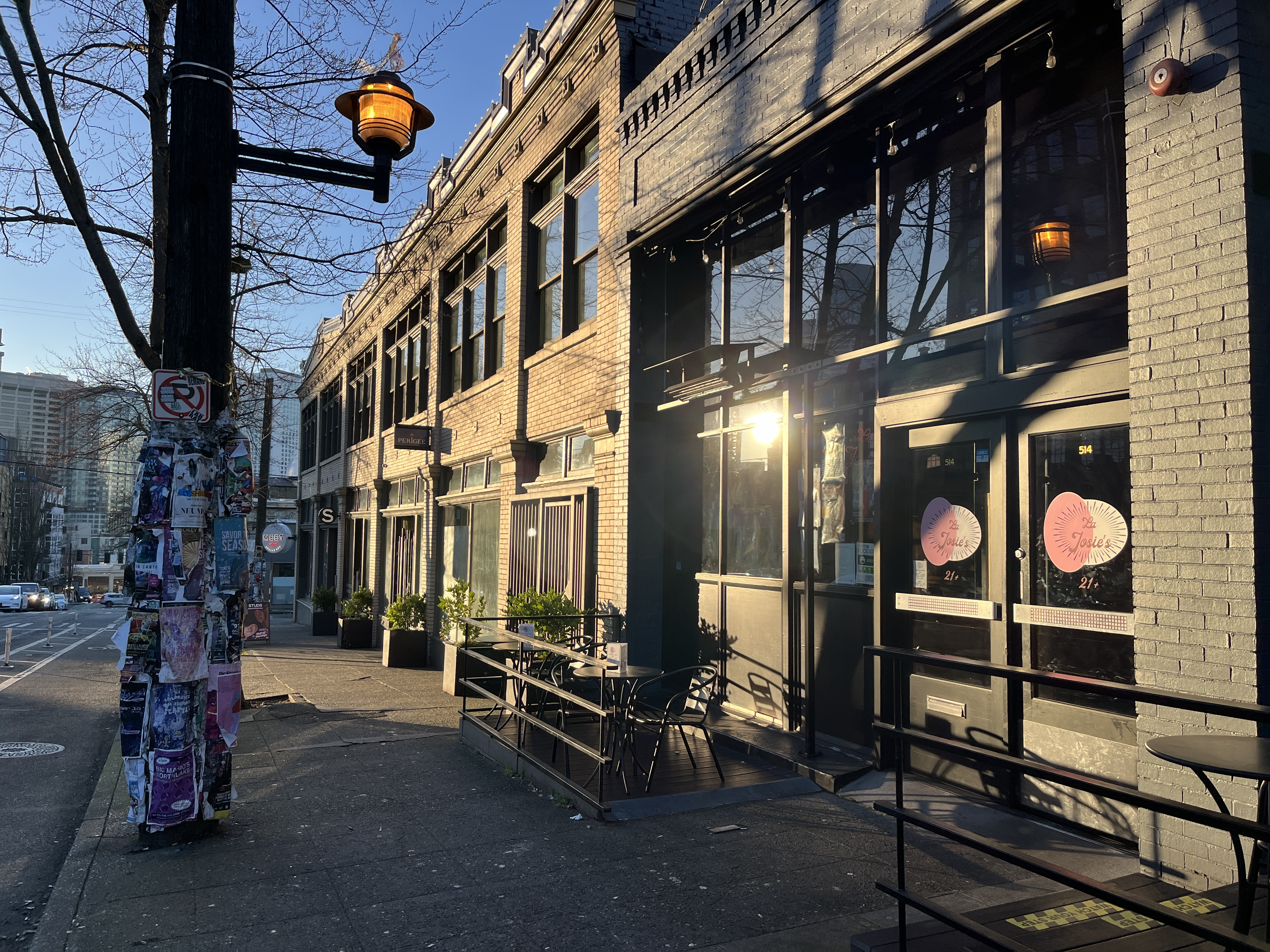
- The restaurant's exterior, 2024
- Interactive map of La Josie's

Restaurant information
- Food type: Mexican
- Location: 514 East Pike Street, Seattle, King, Washington, 98122, United States
- Coordinates: 47.6142°N 122.3249°W
- Website: lajosiesseattle.com

La Josie's is a Mexican restaurant in Seattle, in the U.S. state of Washington. Established in 2020, La Josie's is a sibling to the restaurant Fogón Cocina Mexicana. The family- and Latino-owned business is LGBT-friendly, according to Seattle Gay News.

== Description ==
La Josie's is a Mexican restaurant and tequila bar Pike Street, on Seattle's Capitol Hill. Described as a sibling restaurant to Fogón Cocina Mexicana, the interior features an LGBT pride flag, pink neon signage, and a Day of the Dead-themed mural by Son Doung (also known as Son of a Gun). The restaurant is gay-friendly and has erroneously been described as LGBTQ-owned, according to Seattle Gay News. KOMO-TV says La Josie's "has a relaxed vibe much like its sibling and focuses on upscale casual Mexican dishes".

Food options have included nachos, pozole, cooked prawns, bacon-wrapped shrimp, sopitos, tacos, taquitos, tortas, tortilla soup, tostadas, and chips and queso. In addition to tequila, the drink menu has includes horchata and cocktails such as margaritas.

== History ==
In late 2019, Eater Seattle described plans for the team behind Fogón to open a sibling establishment. La Josie's opened in July 2020, in the space previously occupied by Sun Liquor, then East Trading Company. The business is owned by Noel Cortez and Amparo Ambriz. According to Seattle Gay News, "the allyship demonstrated by this family-owned business is noteworthy". La Josie's has hosted drag shows, participates in an annual fundraiser to raise money for HIV/AIDS services, and displays LGBT pride flags all year long. The restaurant has also been recognized as one of Seattle's Latino- and women-owned establishments.

== See also ==
- LGBT culture in Seattle
- List of Mexican restaurants
