= Beef curry puff =

Beef curry puff may refer to:

- Curry beef turnover, Chinese pastry
- Curry puff, Southeast Asian pastry
