= Devils on horseback =

Dish of prunes or dates wrapped in bacon

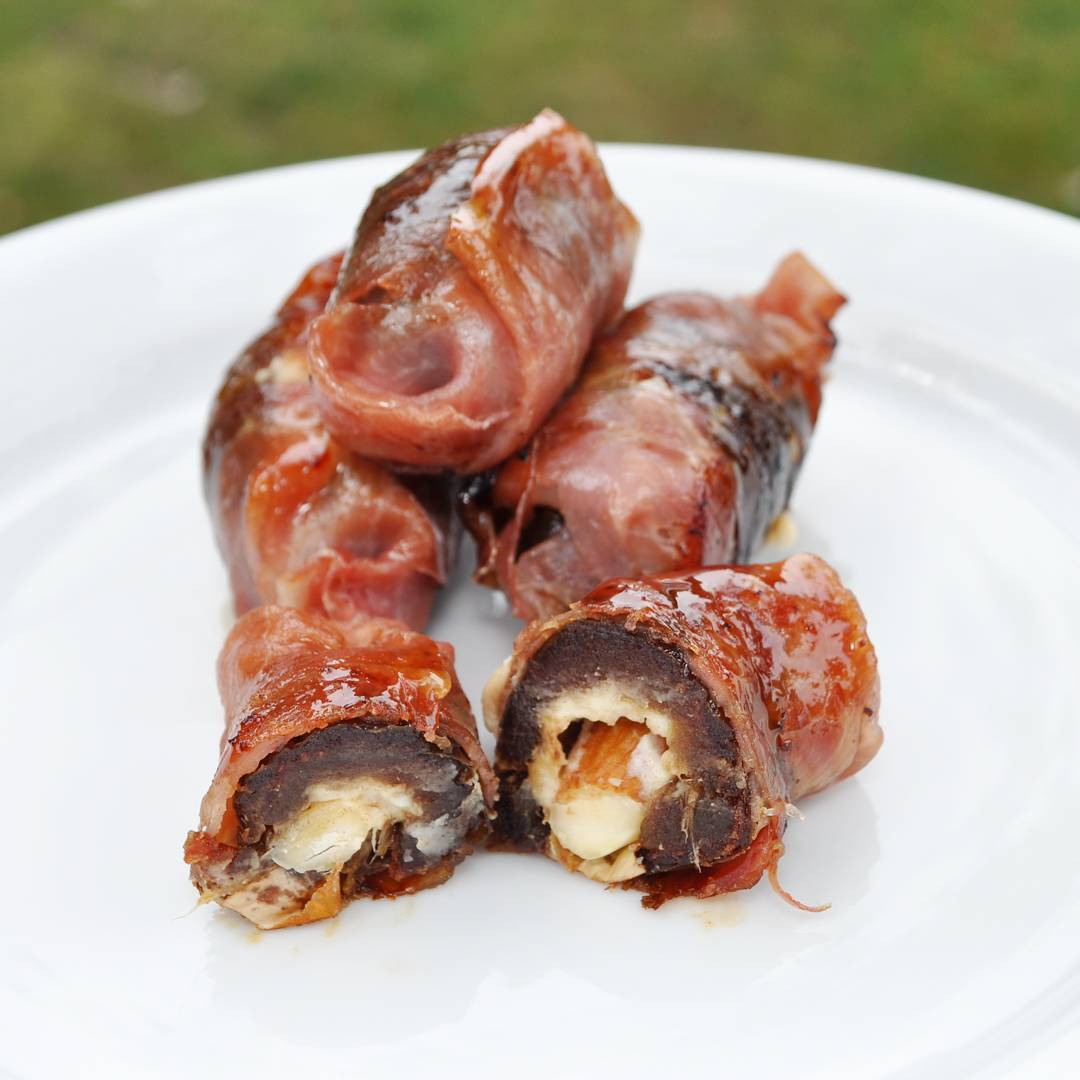
- Bacon-wrapped, almond-stuffed dates
- Course: Hors d'oeuvre or small savoury dish
- Place of origin: United Kingdom
- Main ingredients: Dried fruit (especially dates), chutney, bacon

Devils on horseback are a hot appetizer or small savoury dish of dried fruit stuffed with such ingredients as cheese or nuts, wrapped in bacon, prosciutto or pancetta. The traditional form of the dish is made with a pitted date and bacon, but prunes are also used, usually steeped in brandy or some other liqueur. These are then fried or baked in the oven and quite often served on toast, with chutney and mustard.

The origin of the name "devils on horseback" is unclear. The Oxford English Dictionary states they are "Probably so called on account of being typically served very hot", and gives the earliest reference to 1885, in American agricultural magazine The Country Gentleman. Another source states that there are "a surfeit of theories", but dates the idea (as a refinement of the oyster in bacon combination) to 1800. One recurring suggestion fancifully suggests the name derives from "Norman raiders (who) would ride into towns wearing rashers of bacon over their armour to scare villagers". However the earliest mention of this is from 2008, while the dish itself dates from the 19th century, itself 800 years after the Norman Conquest.

Recipes vary, but in general they are a variation on angels on horseback (bacon wrapped oysters), made by replacing oysters with dried fruit. There are many variations on the basic concept of a bacon-wrapped prune, stuffed with cheese, almonds, or other foods. Devils on horseback are commonly served as part of a Christmas feast.

== See also ==
- Bacon wrapped food
- List of hors d'oeuvre
- List of stuffed dishes
- Pigs in blankets
- Stuffed dates
