= Bacon-wrapped food =

Food that is covered with bacon

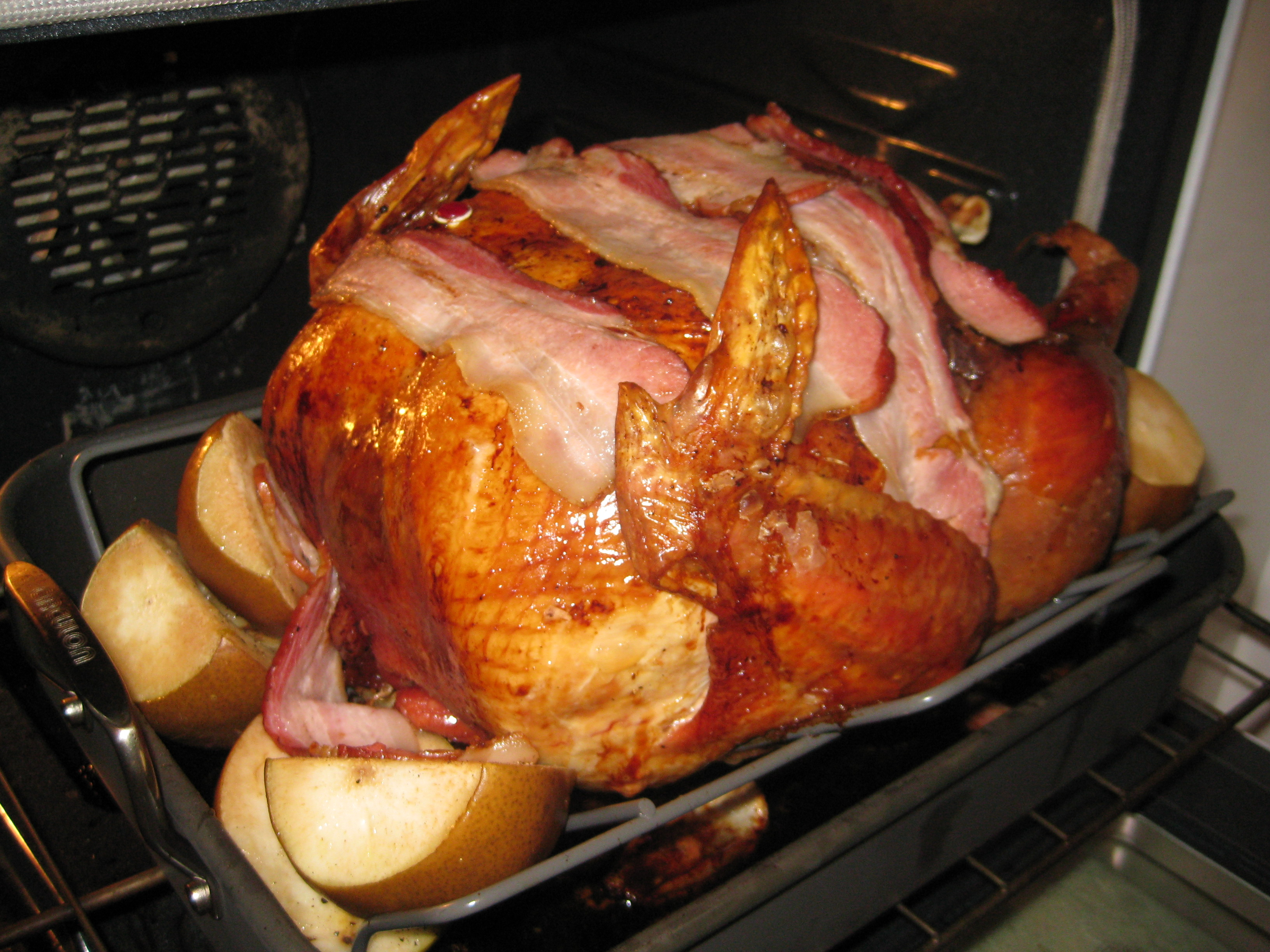
Bacon-wrapped turkey

Bacon-wrapped foods are foods that are prepared by being covered in bacon. They may be baked, fried, or grilled. Popular bacon-wrapped dishes include angels on horseback, devils on horseback, and pigs in blankets. Bacon has long been used for barding roasts, especially game birds.

== Description ==
Bacon wrapping is a style of food preparation, where bacon is wrapped around other ingredients or dishes, and either grilled, fried, or baked.

Many of the wrapped foods, such as livers and asparagus, cook more quickly than bacon does, and when preparing such dishes it is necessary to part-cook the bacon separately, before wrapping the filling and cooking the complete dish. Bacon-wrapped foods can include filet mignon, chicken nuggets, pork chops, tenderloin and shrimp.

== Bacon wrapped dishes ==
=== Bacon roll-ups ===
Bacon roll-ups, or simply rolls, are rolls made of bacon with a wide range of fillings from peanut butter, through asparagus, to cheese and chutney.

=== Angels on horseback ===
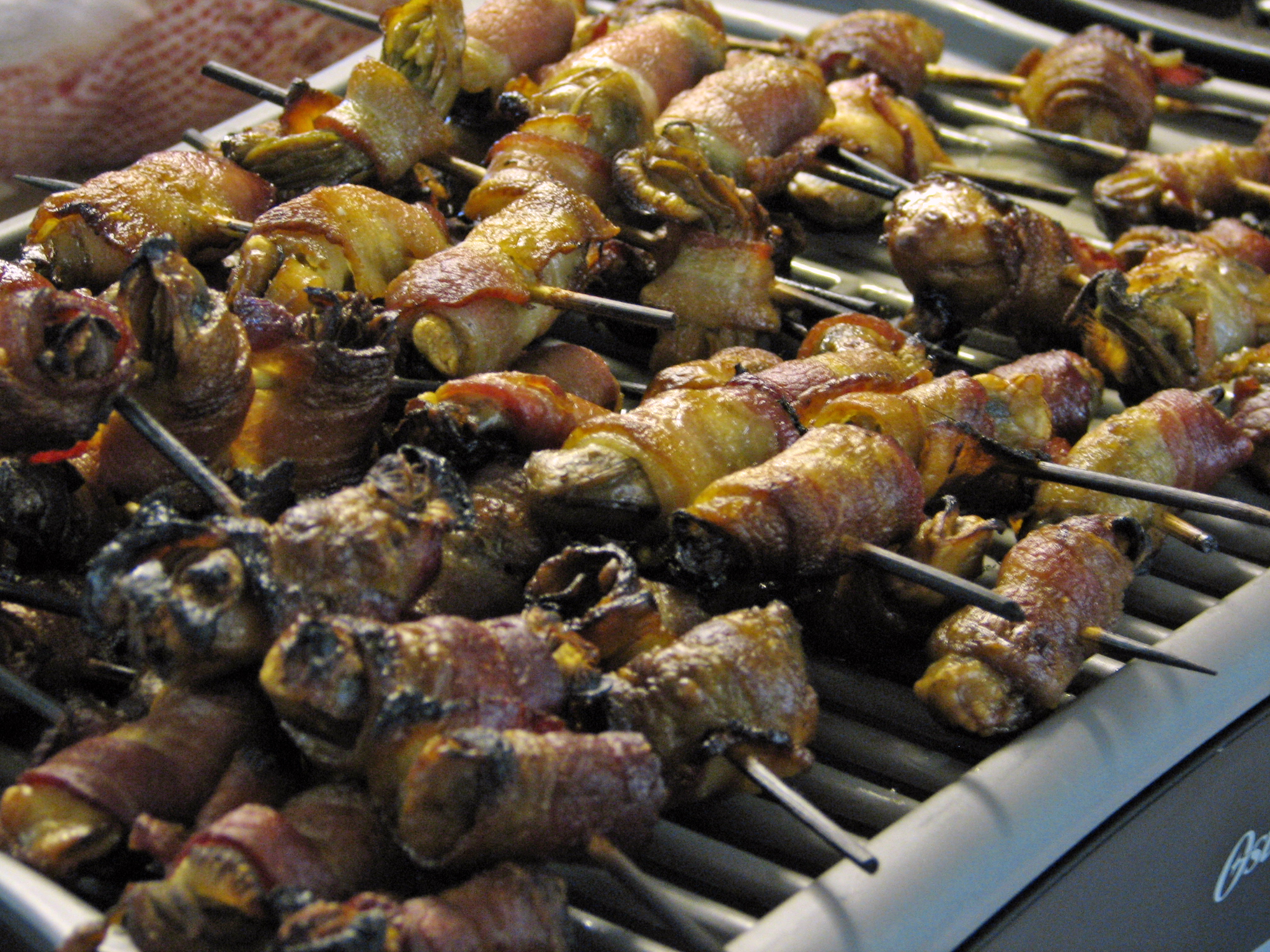
Angels on horseback on a grill

Angels on horseback is a British dish of shucked oysters wrapped with bacon and grilled, and often skewered. It became popular in the Victorian era.

Angels on horseback is a hot appetizer made of oysters wrapped with bacon. In the United Kingdom they can also be a savoury, the final course of a traditional British formal meal. They are somewhat similar to Devils on horseback and the Midwestern version of pigs in a blanket, a traditional dish of the American Midwest. Scallops wrapped in bacon appears to be a variation on this dish.

Strictly speaking angels on horseback (and the original UK form of pigs in a blanket) are an hors d'œuvre, unlike the US variant of pigs in a blanket, which are canapés, since the latter always involve a bread base or wrapping, and angels on horseback are not by necessity served on toast.

=== Bacon-wrapped scallops ===
Bacon-wrapped scallops appear in American recipes starting at the turn of the 20th century, sometimes called "pigs in blankets". They became very popular starting in about 1980.

=== Devils on horseback ===
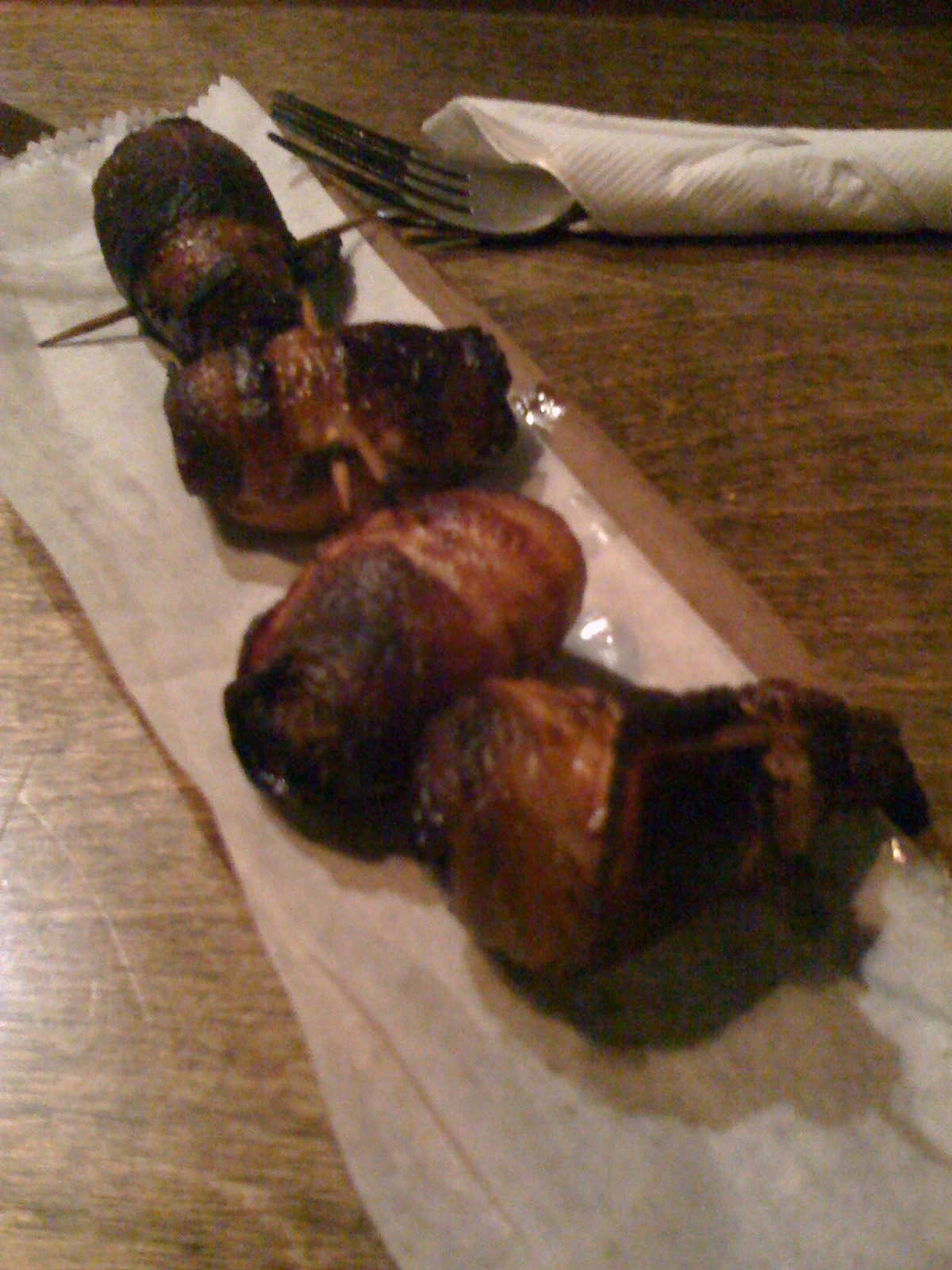
Bacon wrapped, almond-stuffed dates

Devils on horseback is a British dish of bacon-wrapped prunes. The prunes are stuffed with chutney, wrapped in bacon, and grilled.

Devils on horseback are a hot appetizer or savoury.

Recipes vary but in general they are a variation on angels on horseback, made by replacing oysters with dried fruit. The majority of recipes contain a pitted prune (though dates are sometimes used) stuffed with mango chutney and wrapped in bacon. This is then baked in the oven and quite often served on toast, with watercress.

Other recipes stuff the prune with cheese, almonds, smoked oysters or other things in place of the mango chutney. Other versions again use liver pieces in place of the prunes.

Devils on horseback are commonly served as part of a Christmas feast.

=== Pigs in blankets ===
The British dish popular at Christmas consists of sausages wrapped in bacon and baked.

=== Rumaki ===
Rumaki consists of water chestnuts and chicken livers wrapped in bacon. It was introduced at the Tiki-style restaurant Don the Beachcomber in the 1940s.

== At state fairs ==
Bacon-wrapped food is popular at American state fairs. In 2013, the California State fair served bacon wrapped hot dogs, bacon-wrapped mushrooms, bacon-wrapped turkey legs, and bacon-wrapped cheesecake. In 2016, the North Carolina State Fair served bacon wrapped grilled cheese. In 2018, the Minnesota State Fair had bacon-wrapped pork belly.
