= Chipolata =

Type of sausage

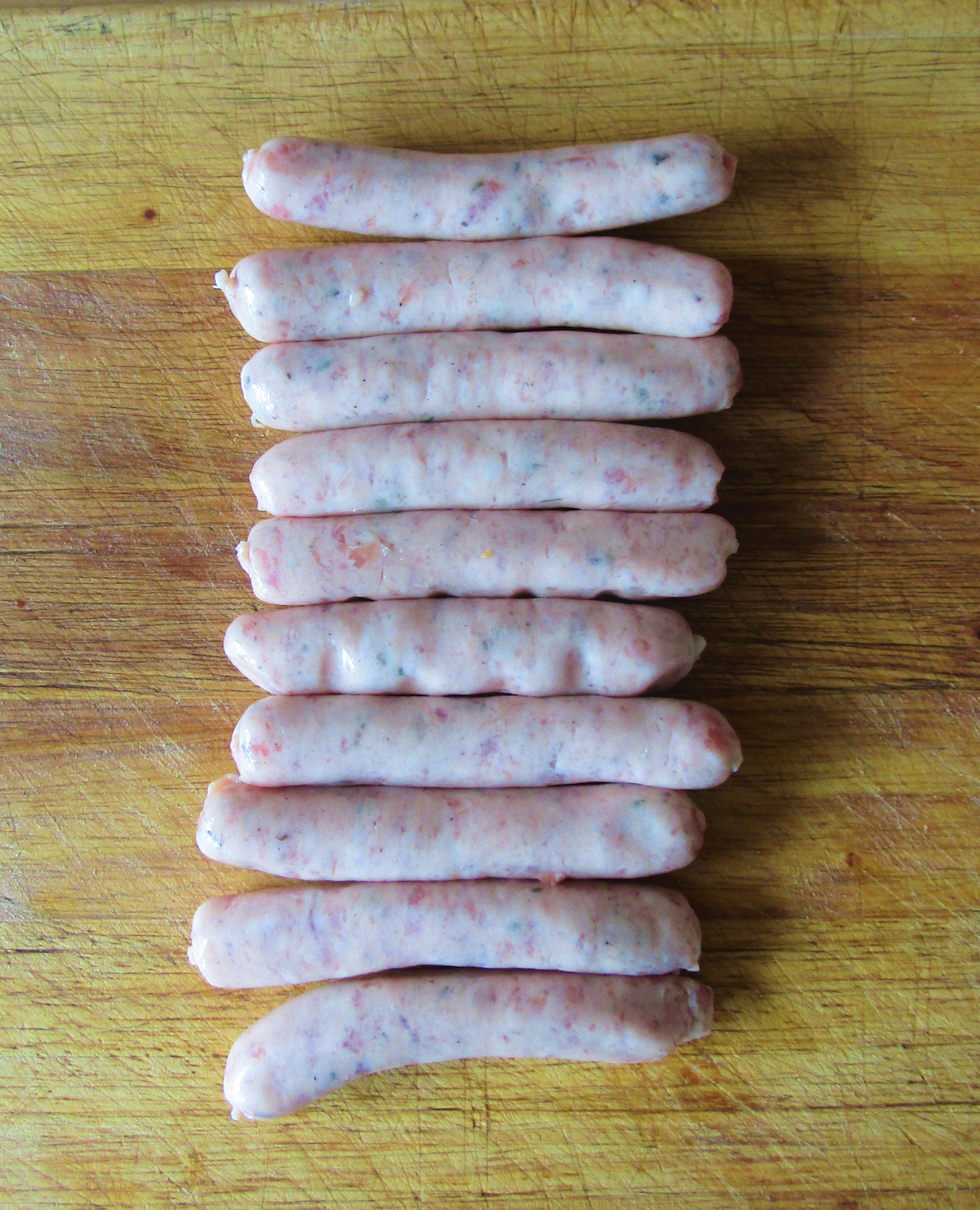
- Chipolatas ready for cooking
- Place of origin: France
- Main ingredients: pork or chicken

A chipolata (/ˌtʃɪpəˈlɑːtə/ (British) or /ˌtʃɪpəˈlædə/ (American)) is a type of small sausage, usually containing minced pork, or sometimes minced chicken.

== History ==
In the Oxford Companion to Food, Alan Davidson gives the derivation of the name as the Italian cipollata, meaning a dish containing onion (cipolla being the Italian for onion), but adds that the sausages called chipolatas contain no onions: "the origin of this usage is a mystery". Both Davidson and the Oxford English Dictionary give instances of early French and English uses of the Italian-derived term to mean dishes containing onions and small sausages. Le Cuisinier gascon (1740) gives a recipe for chicken wings à la chipolata, which includes "des petits oignons blanchis, & des petites saucisses à qui vous avez fait suer la graisse" – small blanched onions and little sausages gently cooked in fat.

A 1750 English cookery book refers to "Tendrons of veal en Chipolata", and "Fillets of pork à la Chipolata". In the nineteenth century Louis Ude in his The French Cook (1816) gives a recipe for "Tendrons of veal en Chipolata" which includes the direction, "take a few small sausages, some small onions stewed very white".

Davidson suggests that the French came to apply the term "chipolata" to the sausages rather than the accompanying onions. By the 1830s the name had widely been transferred to the sausages. Richard Dolby in The Cook's Dictionary and Housekeeper's Directory (1832), gives a recipe for stuffed goose containing "twenty chipolata sausages [pre-cooked], twenty large mushrooms, twenty truffles" etc. The Comte de Courchamps, in his Dictionnaire général de la cuisine française (1853) defines chipolata as "a kind of stew of Italian origin", and gives a recipe calling for "twelve little sausages called chipolates".

== Content ==
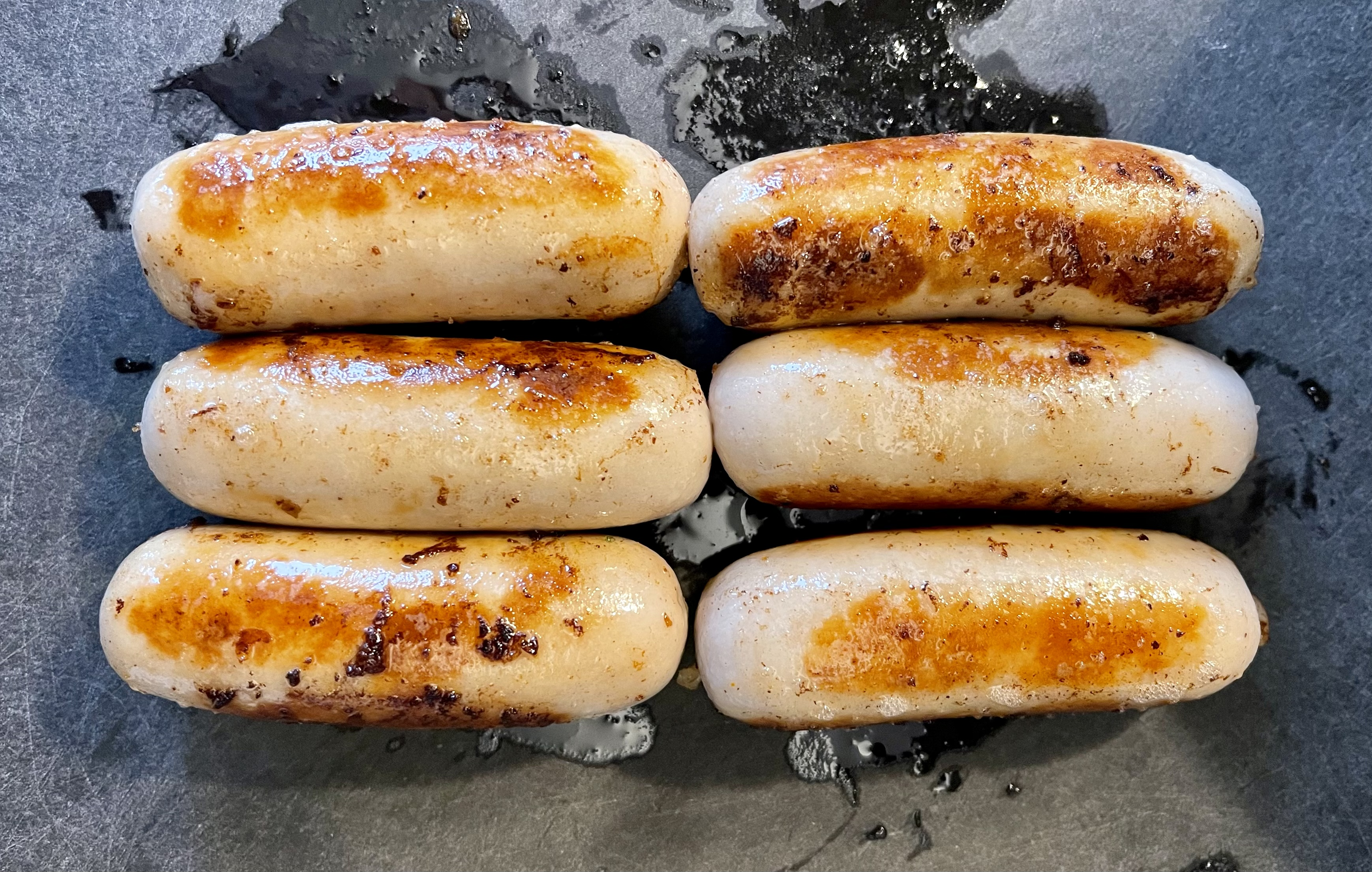
In Switzerland, cipollate are small sausages containing veal, milk and pork.

Davidson writes that "chipolatas are popular in France, where they are finger width, relatively long, and usually pan fried". In both American and English usage, chipolatas are small sausages, including the very small cocktail sausages and other miniature versions of ordinary sausages. They are typically made from minced pork seasoned with salt and épices fines, a mixture that may contain ground bay leaf, basil, cinnamon, clove, mace, marjoram or oregano, nutmeg, paprika, sage, thyme and white pepper. Chicken chipolatas are also on sale in France and Britain.

Chipolatas are popular in Britain. They frequently appear as part of a Christmas dinner wrapped in streaky bacon as pigs in blankets. In French cuisine, a garniture à la chipolata consists of onions, chipolata sausages, chestnuts, salt pork, and sometimes carrots and olives, in a demiglace sauce.

== Sources ==
- Beck, Simone; Julia Child (1979) [1970]. Mastering the Art of French Cooking, Volume 2. London: Penguin. ISBN 0-14-046221-X.
- Davidson, Alan (1999). The Oxford Companion to Food. Oxford: Oxford University Press. ISBN 978-0-19-211579-9.
- Dolby, Richard (1832). The Cook's Dictionary and Housekeeper's Directory. London: Colburn and Bentley. OCLC 181695045.
- Escoffier, Auguste (1934). Ma Cuisine (in French). Paris: Flammarion. OCLC 981486233.
- Gascon, Cuisinier, Le (1740). Le Cuisinier gascon (in French). Amsterdam: Unspecified. OCLC 1154650852.
- Ude, Louis-Eustache (1816). The French Cook (fourth ed.). London: Ebers. OCLC 46643737.

== See also ==
- List of sausages
