= Pigs in blankets =

Sausages wrapped in bacon

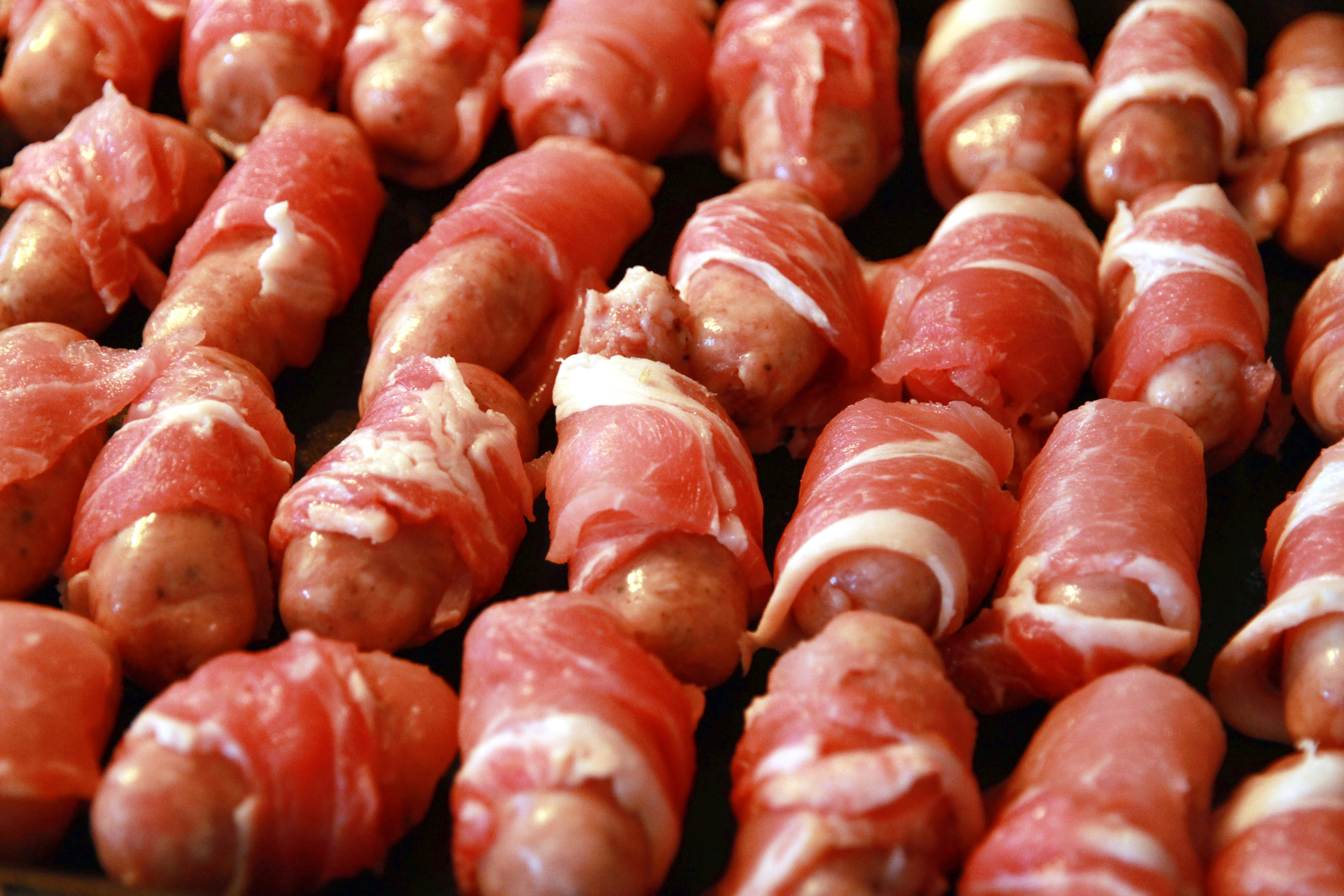
- Pigs in blankets, prepped but not yet cooked
- Alternative names: Soldiers in kilts
- Type: Sausage wrapped in bacon
- Course: Side dish
- Place of origin: UK and Ireland
- Main ingredients: Chipolata, cocktail sausage, hot dog or other sausage
- Food energy (per serving): 325 per 100g

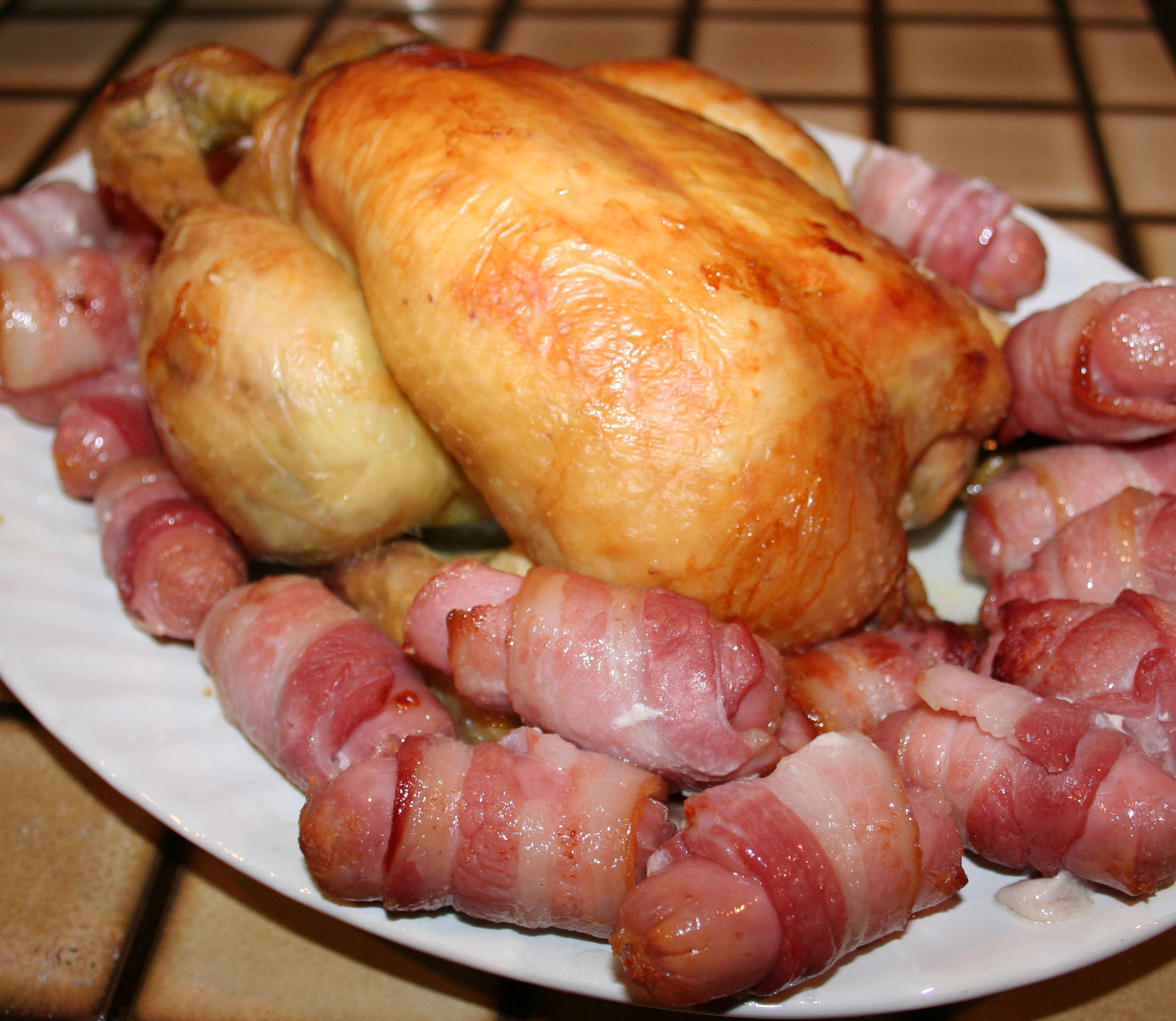
Pigs in blankets surrounding a small roast chicken

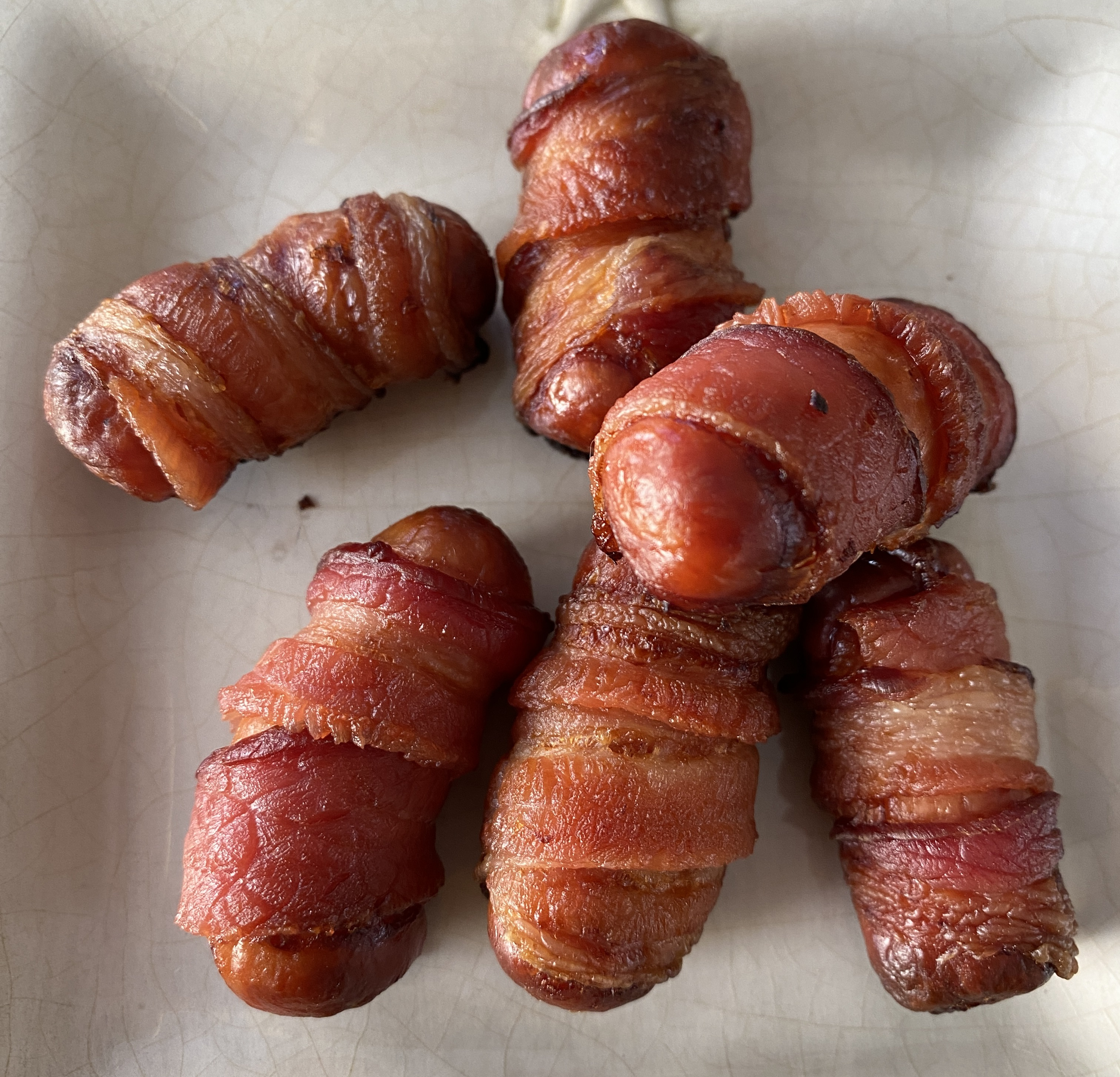
Pigs in blankets

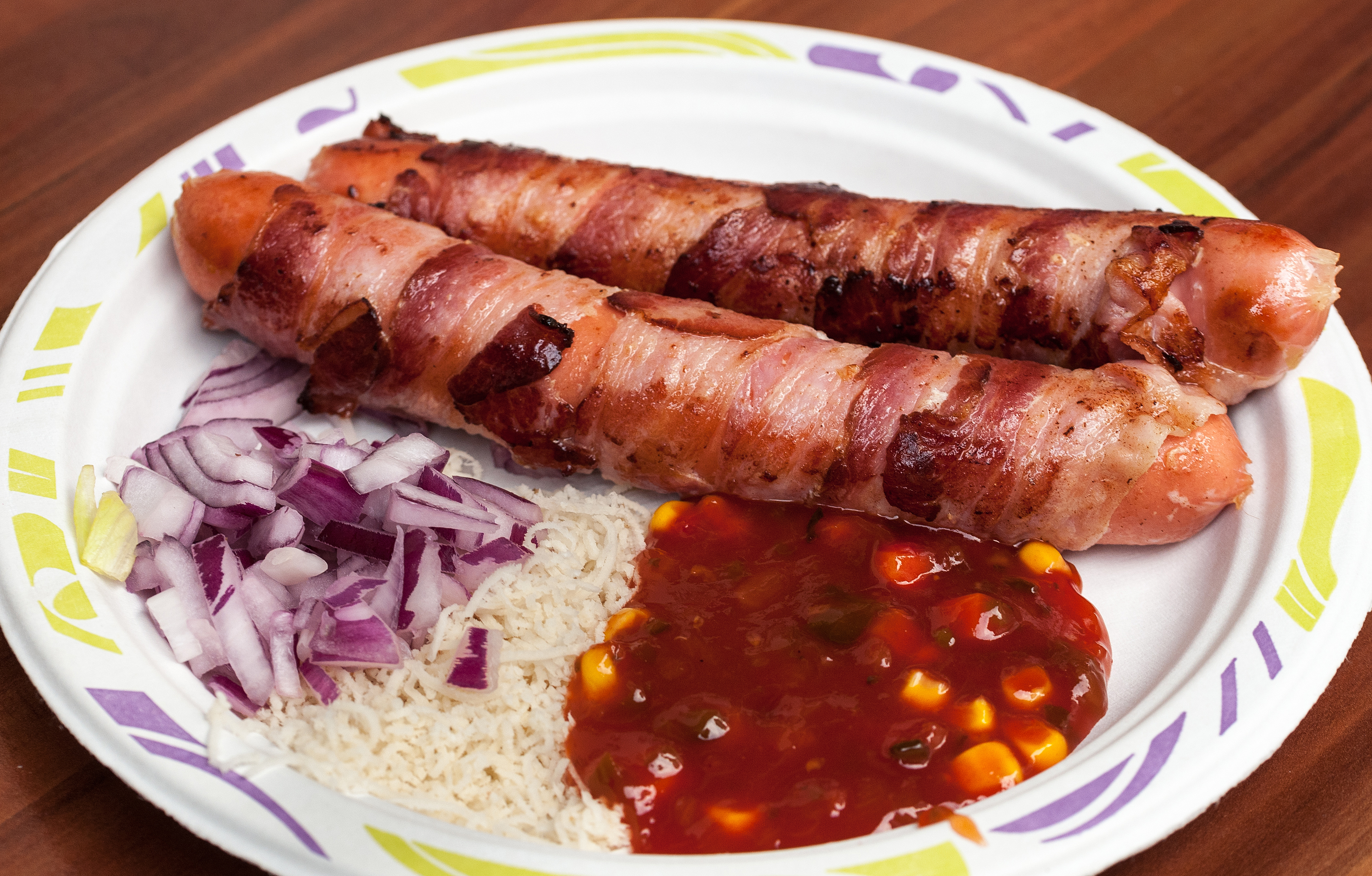
Berner Würstel

Pigs in blankets, kilted sausages or kilted soldiers is a dish served in the United Kingdom and Ireland consisting of small sausages (usually chipolatas) wrapped in bacon. They are a popular and traditional accompaniment to roast turkey in a Christmas dinner and are served as a side dish.

== Description and history ==
Pigs in blankets is a dish served in the United Kingdom and Ireland consisting of small sausages (usually chipolatas) wrapped in bacon.

In general it is a seasonal item, seldom offered commercially outside the Christmas season, and it has spawned food-industry offshoot products such as pigs-in-blankets flavoured mayonnaise, peanuts, crisps, vaping liquid, and chocolates as well as versions of Christmas-associated consumer items such as pyjamas made with a pigs-in-blankets print. Tesco in 2019 reported that a majority of shoppers they surveyed planned to serve the dish at Christmas dinner and that more planned to serve pigs in blankets than any other side dish, including Yorkshire pudding, another traditional Christmas dish.

According to Good Housekeeping and The Independent, they are considered a staple of the Christmas season. In 2013, 12 December was declared National Pigs in Blankets Day.

== Ingredients, preparation, and serving ==
Traditionally the sausage used is a cocktail-sized pork-based chipolata and the wrapping a streaky bacon, but variations include those using chorizo or chicken sausage, using sausages with added ingredients such as apples or chestnuts, using full-sized chipolatas, or using flavoured or smoked bacon. Commercially available varieties may have around 325 calories and 22 g of fat per 100 g serving.

The wrapped sausages may be pan-fried, baked, or a combination.

They are a popular and traditional accompaniment to roast turkey in a Christmas dinner and are served as a side dish. They may also be served on Boxing Day.

== Similar dishes ==
In Denmark, there is a bacon-wrapped sausage served in a bun known as the Pølse i svøb, which means "sausage in blanket", usually sold at hot dog stands known as pølsevogne (sausage-wagons).

In Austria and Germany, a sausage filled with cheese and wrapped in bacon is known as Berner Würstel or Bernese sausages.

In Luxembourg, Blanne Jang is a scalded sausage filled with cheese and wrapped in bacon.

== Similarly named dishes ==
The American dish pigs in a blanket is sometimes confused with this dish, but their only similarity is the name and the fact the foundation ingredient is a wrapped sausage; the US dish wraps the sausage in bread or pastry dough.

In some parts of the US heavily influenced by Polish immigration, "pigs in a blanket" may refer to stuffed cabbage rolls, such as the Polish gołąbki.

== See also ==
- Bacon-wrapped food
- List of Christmas dishes
- List of stuffed dishes
