= Oysters en brochette =

Classic dish in New Orleans Creole cuisine

- Course: Hors d'oeuvre
- Place of origin: United States
- Region or state: New Orleans
- Main ingredients: Oysters, bacon
- Variations: Oysters, mushrooms

Oysters en brochette is a classic dish in New Orleans Creole cuisine. Raw oysters are skewered, alternating with pieces of partially cooked bacon. The entire dish is then broiled or breaded (usually with corn flour) then either deep-fried or sautéed. The traditional presentation is on triangles of toast with the skewer removed and dusted with salt and pepper or topped with either maître d'hôtel butter or a meunière sauce. When prepared well, the dish should have a crispy exterior and a soft savory center with a textural contrast between the bacon and the oyster. It was usually offered on restaurant menus as an appetizer, but was also a popular lunch entrée.

== History ==
At one time, it was a ubiquitous option on menus across the spectrum of New Orleans restaurants. The dish is served, as of November 2015, at Galatoire's.

== Variations ==
Oysters en brochette has been prepared with mushrooms on the skewers, rather than bacon, and also with both mushrooms, bacon, chunks of tomato or cubes of cooked ham.

== Similar dishes ==
A similar dish served as an hors d'oeuvre is angels on horseback. Single oysters are wrapped in partially cooked slices of bacon, each skewered with a toothpick. They are floured, deep-fried, and then passed on cocktail platters with a dipping sauce.

== See also ==
- Cuisine of New Orleans
- List of seafood dishes
- List of mushroom dishes
- Louisiana Creole cuisine
