= Crab puff =

Ball of crab meat deep-fried in batter

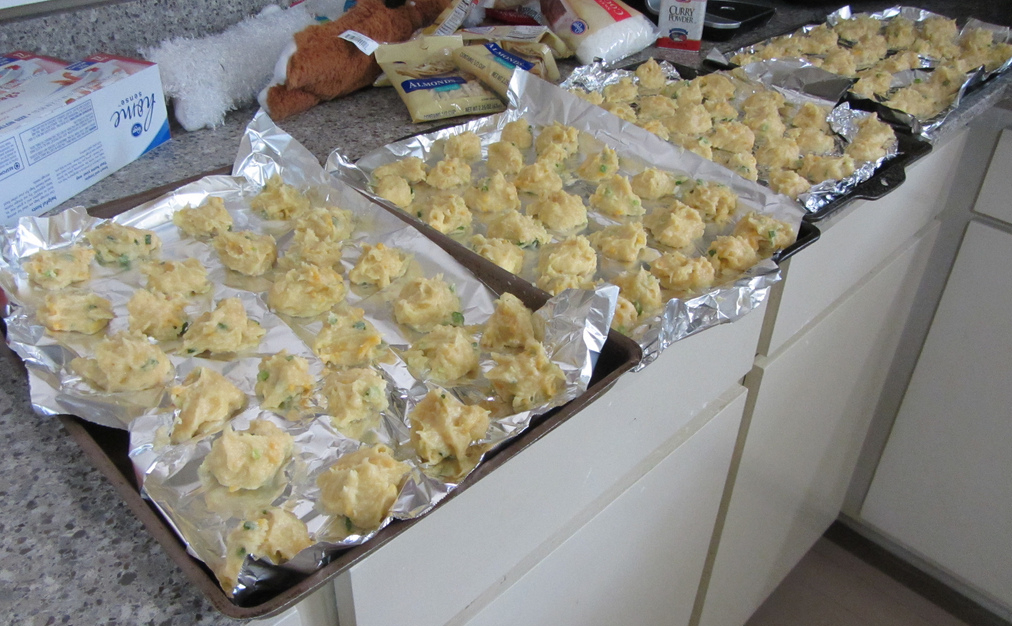
- Crab puffs on trays
- Course: Hors d'oeuvre
- Place of origin: United States
- Main ingredients: Crab meat

A crab puff is a ball of crab meat, mixed with flour, egg, and seasonings, that has been deep-fried in batter. It is also sometimes known as a crab fluff.

They are often served in restaurants as an appetizer or side dish. They may be served alone, or with any of a variety of sauces, such as tartar sauce, cocktail sauce, or sweet and sour sauce.

== See also ==
- Crab rangoon
- List of hors d'oeuvre
- List of seafood dishes
