= Picada (Rioplatense cuisine) =

Hors d'oeuvre from Argentine cuisine

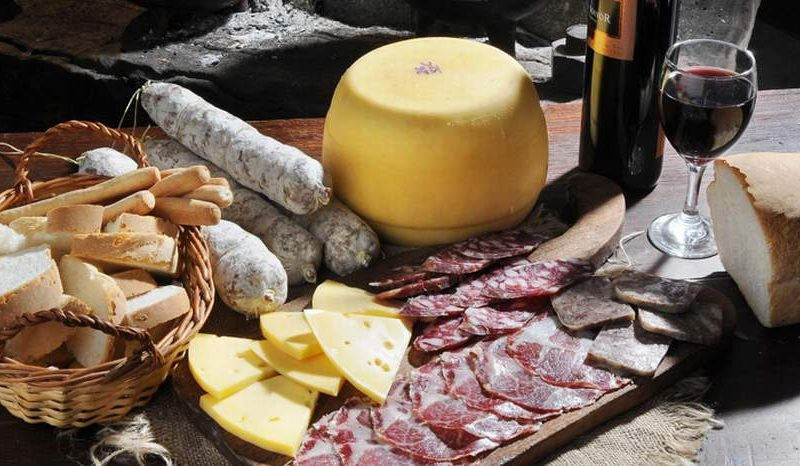
- A typical picada from Córdoba served with Argentine wine
- Place of origin: Argentina and Uruguay
- Main ingredients: Cheeses, breads, cured meats, fermented sausages, snack foods, potato chips, nuts, pâté, pickled foods

A picada (pronounced [piˈkaða]; from picar, "to nibble at") is a typical dish of Argentine and Uruguayan cuisine usually served as a starter, although sometimes as a main course. Related to the Italian antipasto and the Spanish tapas brought by massive immigration, it consists of a serving of savory snack and finger foods.

A characteristic picada includes cheeses, cured meats, fermented sausages, olives and peanuts, although this varies depending on the country and who prepares it. One of the most popular dishes in the Rio de la Plata cuisine, picadas are a social event that involves gathering with family or friends.

== History ==
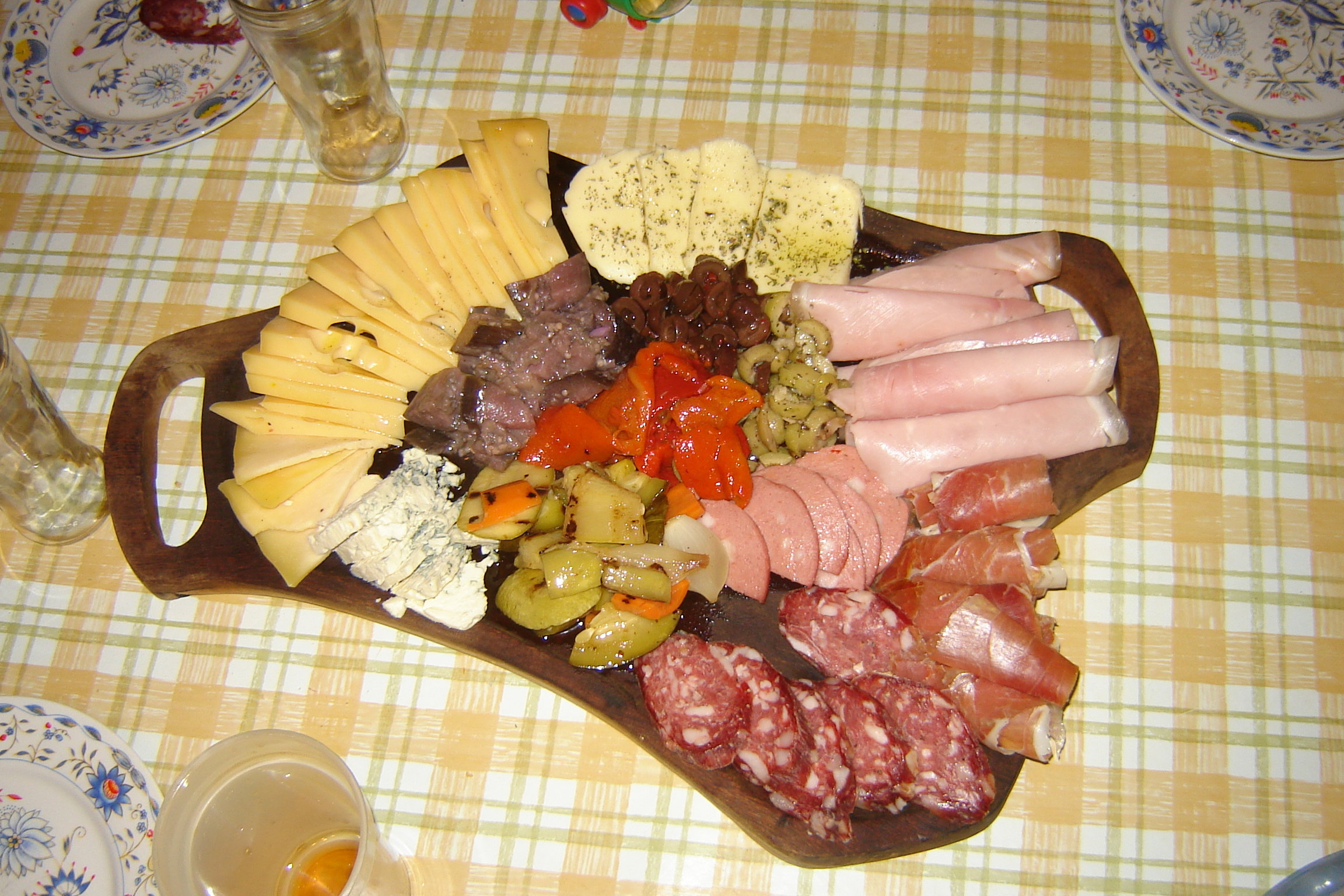
A typical picada.

The origin of the picada is controversial. It is considered a culinary heritage of the massive Spanish and Italian immigration to the Río de la Plata region —encompassing both Argentina and Uruguay—, introducing the tradition of tapas and antipasto, respectively.

Some consider the picada to be the successor to the previous concept of "copetín". In the 1940s Buenos Aires' restaurants, a copetín was a tapas-inspired started served in a metal "triolet" plate, that included olives, potato chips, peanuts and palitos salados (flour-based snack sticks).

Although it was traditionally served as a starter, in recent years the picada has gained popularity as a main dish.

In Uruguay, picadas made with different ingredients are served in restaurants, mainly in the traditional and oldest bars in Montevideo. Picada is also widely consumed at family gatherings on Christmas Eve.

== See also ==
- List of hors d'oeuvre
