= Crab Rangoon =

American Chinese dumpling appetizers

Crab Rangoons
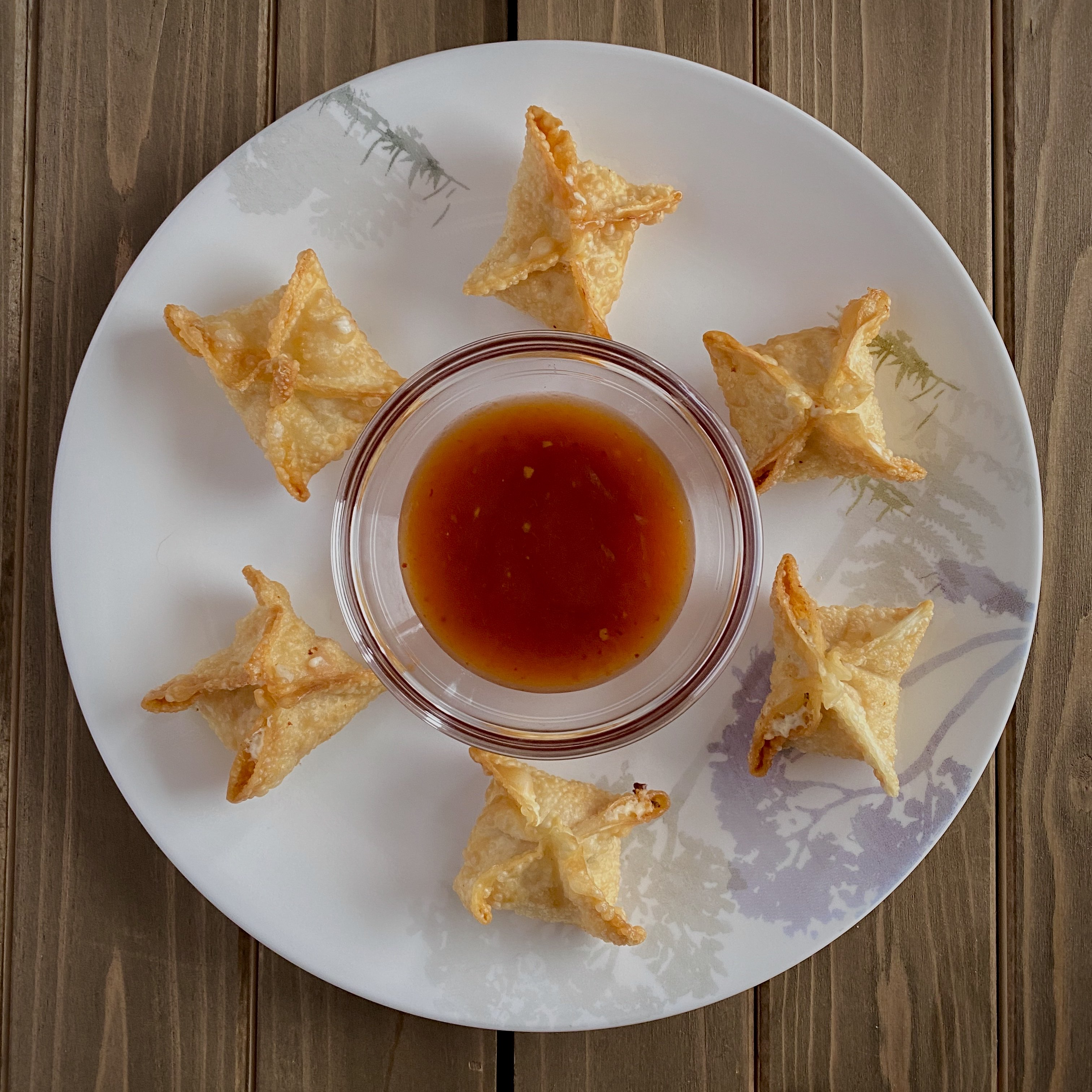
- Type: Dumpling
- Course: Appetizer
- Place of origin: United States
- Main ingredients: Wonton wrapper, cream cheese, crab meat or imitation crab meat, scallions, garlic

Crab Rangoon
- Chinese: 蟹角
- Hanyu Pinyin: xiè jiǎo
- Cantonese Yale: háaih gok
- Literal meaning: Crab horn
Transcriptions
Standard Mandarin
- Hanyu Pinyin: xiè jiǎo
Yue: Cantonese
- Yale Romanization: háaih gok

Alternative Chinese name
- Traditional Chinese: 炸蟹角
- Hanyu Pinyin: zhá xiè jiǎo
- Cantonese Yale: ja háaih gok
- Literal meaning: Fried crab horn
Transcriptions
Standard Mandarin
- Hanyu Pinyin: zhá xiè jiǎo
Yue: Cantonese
- Yale Romanization: ja háaih gok

Second alternative Chinese name
- Traditional Chinese: 蟹仰光
- Hanyu Pinyin: xiè yǎng guāng
- Cantonese Yale: háaih yéuhng gwōng
- Literal meaning: Crab Rangoon
Transcriptions
Standard Mandarin
- Hanyu Pinyin: xiè yǎng guāng
Yue: Cantonese
- Yale Romanization: háaih yéuhng gwōng

Crab Rangoon, sometimes called crab puffs, crab rangoon puffs, crab ragoons, cheese wontons, or cream cheese rangoons, are filled crisp dumpling appetizers served primarily in American Chinese restaurants.

== Preparation ==
The filling is made with a combination of cream cheese, crab meat or imitation crab meat, scallions or onion, garlic, and other flavorings. A small amount of the filling is wrapped in each wonton wrapper. The dumpling is then shaped by either folding the wrapper over into a triangle, by creating a four-pointed star, by gathering it up into a flower or purse shape, or by twisting it into the traditional wonton shape.

The appetizers are cooked to crispness by deep-frying in vegetable oil or by baking. They can be served hot or cold. In North America, crab rangoon is often served with a sauce for dipping such as soy sauce, plum sauce, duck sauce, sweet and sour sauce, or a hot mustard sauce.

== History ==
Crab Rangoon was on the menu of the "Polynesian-style" restaurant Trader Vic's in Beverly Hills in 1955 and in San Francisco since at least 1956. Although the appetizer has the name of the Burmese city of Rangoon, now known by Burmese as 'Yangon', the dish was probably invented in the United States by Chinese-American chef Joe Young working under Victor Bergeron, founder of Trader Vic's. Trader Vic's featured a menu that included American Chinese cuisine, which could have led to the invention of the crab rangoon when working with wonton wrappers. A "Rangoon crab a la Jack" was mentioned as a dish at a Hawaiian-style party in 1952 but without further detail and so may or may not be the same thing.

Although cream cheese was a staple of 1940s and 1950s American cuisine, it is not found in Chinese or Burmese cuisine.

== Names ==
They may be referred to as crab rangoons, crab puffs, crab pillows, crab cheese wontons, or cheese wontons.

== Gallery ==
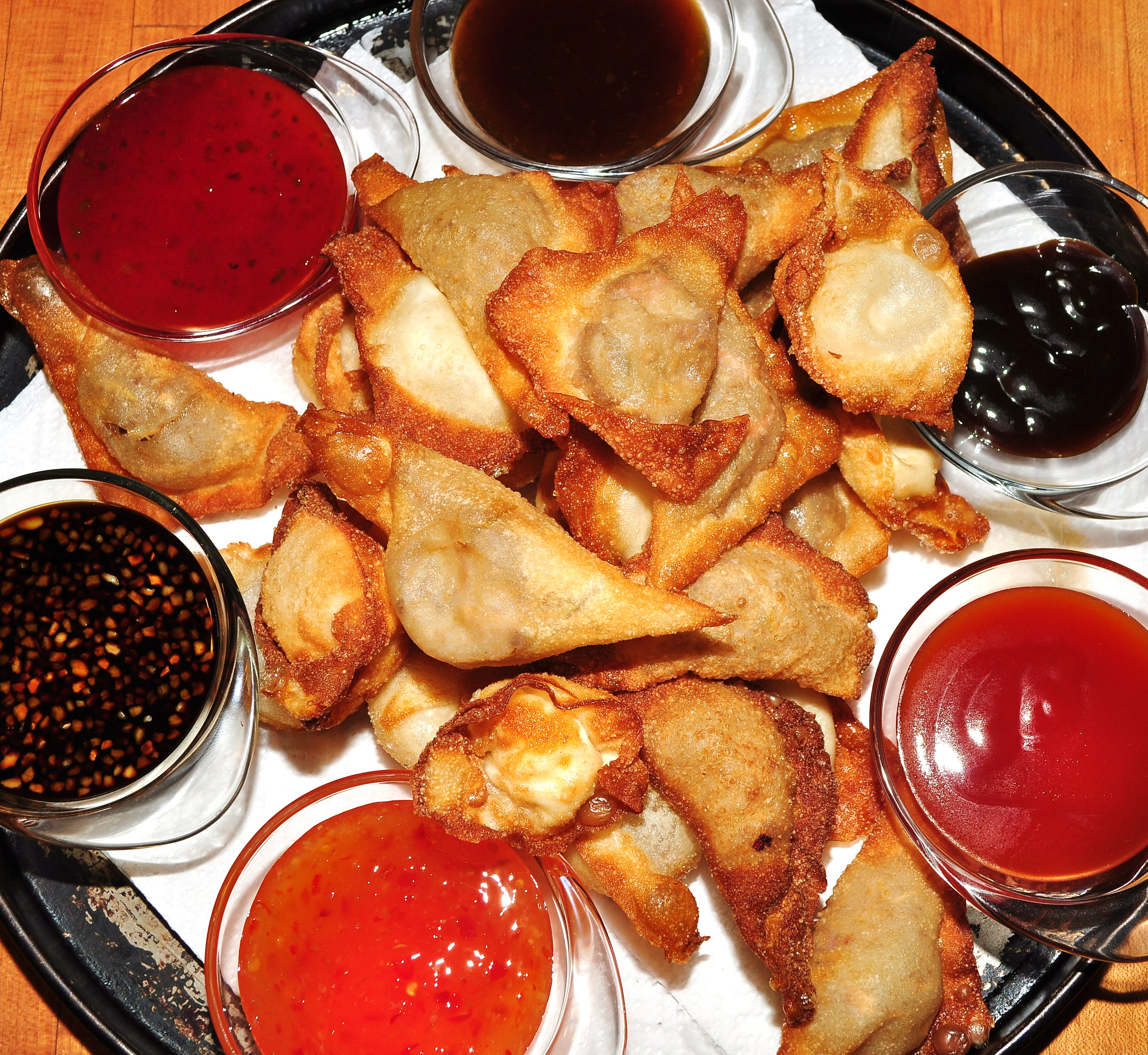
Triangular fried crab rangoons

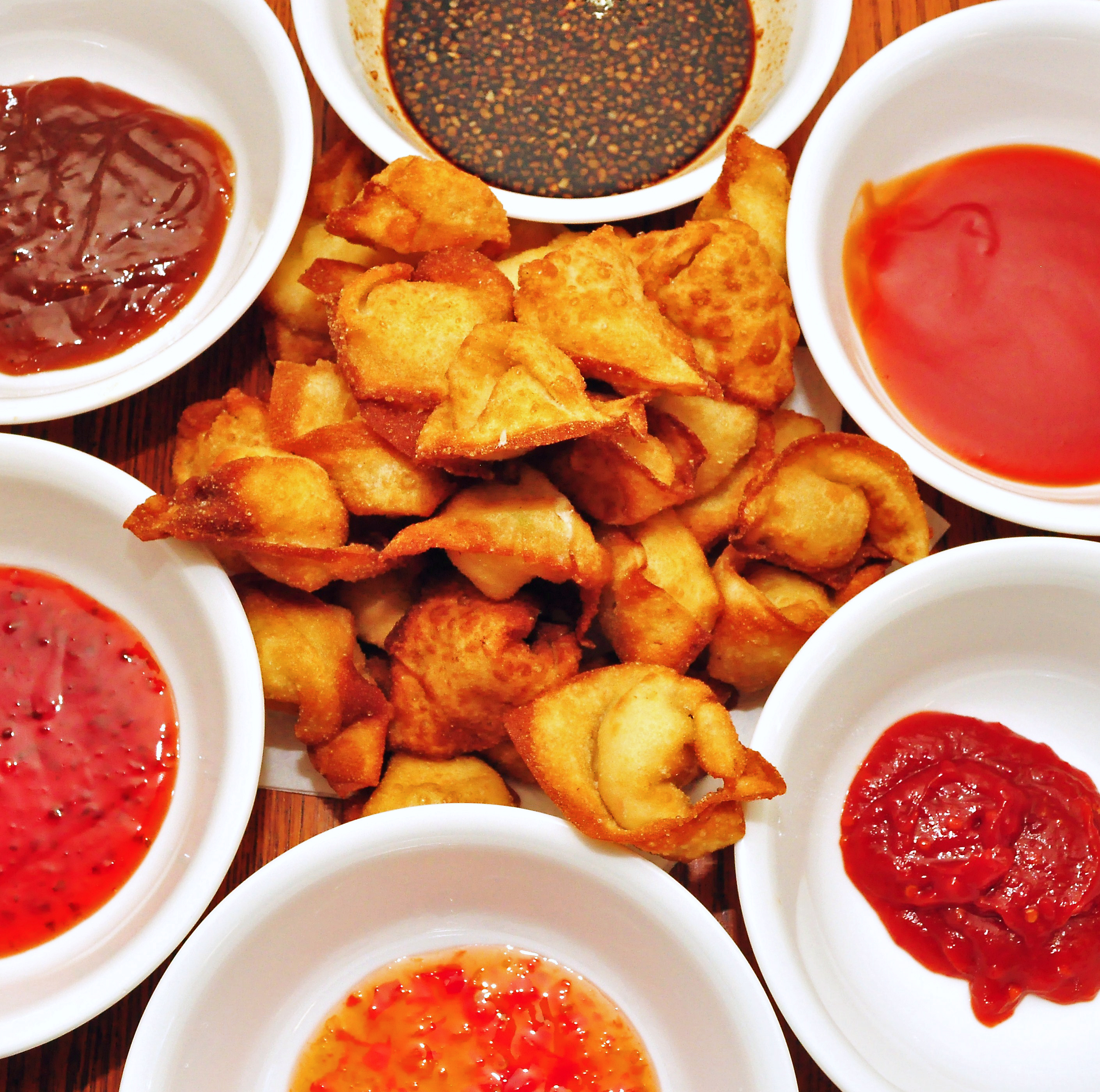
In the wonton shape, surrounded by dipping sauces

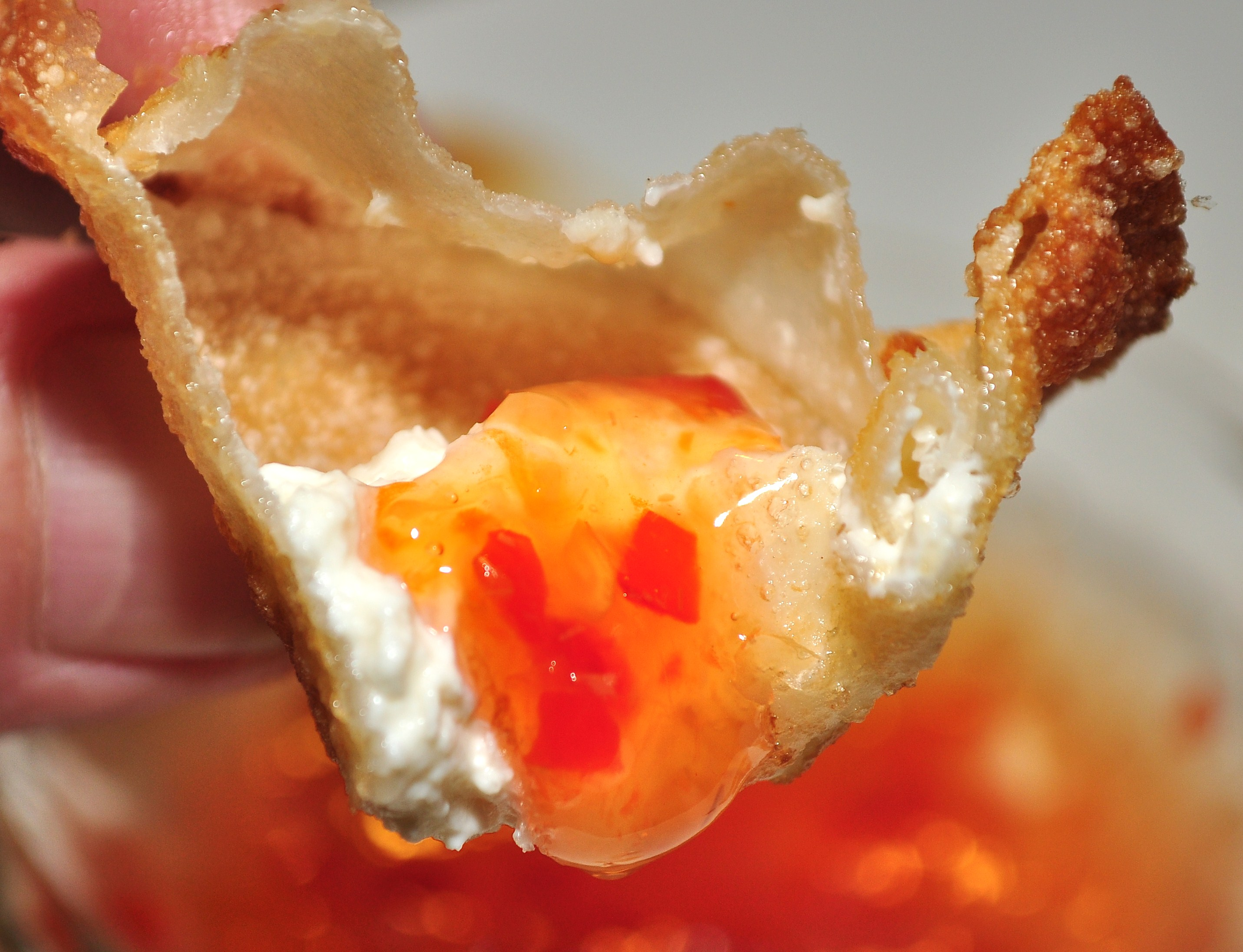
Inside, showing the crisp shell, white filling, and golden dipping sauce.

== See also ==
- Chicken Kiev
- Crab puff
- Curry beef turnover
- List of crab dishes
- List of deep fried foods
- List of hors d'oeuvre
- List of seafood dishes
- Yau gok
