= Stuffed dates =

Heated dates filled with meat, mint, and parsley

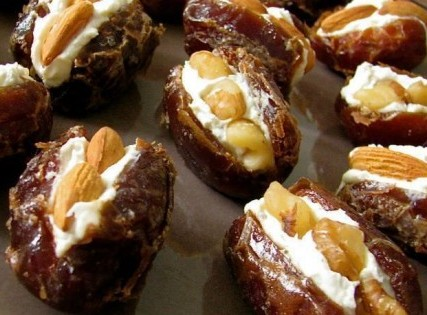
- Region or state: Levant
- Serving temperature: Hot, cold, room temperature
- Main ingredients: Dates, meat, nuts
- Variations: fresh dates, dried dates

Stuffed dates (Arabic: تمر محشي, romanized: Tamer Mahshe, Hebrew: תמר ממולא, romanized: Tamar Memouleh) are boiled or heated dates filled with meat, mint and parsley, with different and modern stuffing including butters and goat cheese. In the Middle East and North Africa, fillings can include nuts, candied fruit, tahini, and cheese.

It is a popular Levantine dish and is served on rice or bulgur. Variations can include fresh or dried dates.

== See also ==
- List of stuffed dishes
- Devils on horseback
- Medjool
