= Fogón Cocina Mexicana =

Restaurant in Seattle, Washington, U.S.

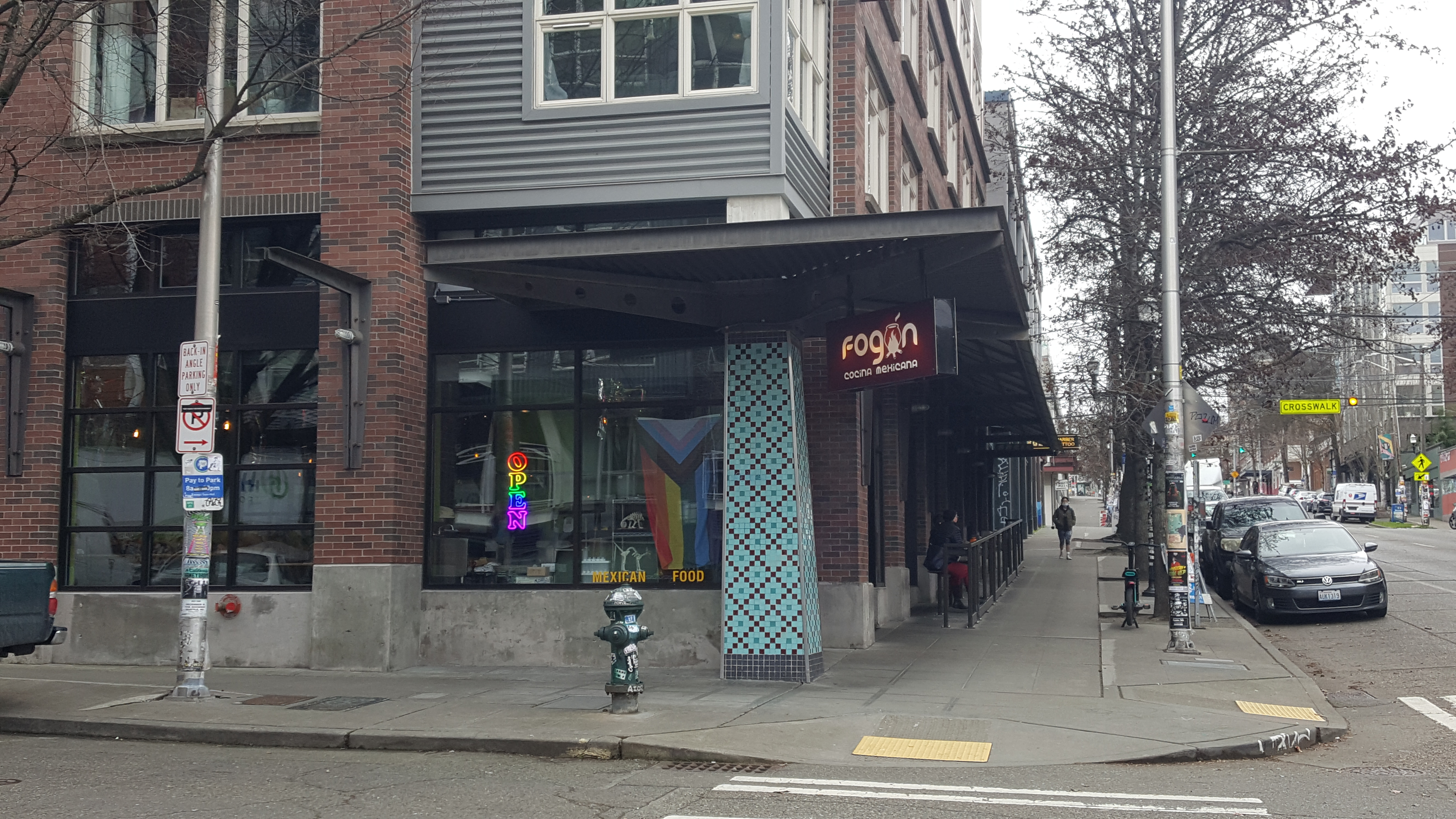
- The restaurant's exterior, 2022
- Interactive map of Fogón Cocina Mexicana

Restaurant information
- Food type: Mexican
- Location: 600 E. Pine Street, Seattle, Washington, 98122, United States
- Coordinates: 47.615404°N 122.324263°W
- Seating capacity: 110
- Website: fogonseattle.com

Fogón Cocina Mexicana is a Mexican restaurant in Seattle's Capitol Hill neighborhood, in the United States.

== Description and history ==
The restaurant has a 110-person capacity, The interior features "bamboo tables and benches, and a tortilla-making station that's pretty damn cool". Fogón operated via takeout and delivery during the COVID-19 pandemic.

The Capitol Hill tequila bar La Josie's, established in 2020, has been described as Fogón's "sibling" restaurant.

== Reception ==
The Seattle Post-Intelligencer has called Fogón the neighborhood's most popular Mexican restaurant. Seattle Magazine included Fogón in a 2014 list of the city's best Mexican restaurants and said, "Mexican food lovers who want a little privacy and less of a scene on Capitol Hill will find solace in the unpretentious Fogón, with the bar separated from the restaurant to make drinkers and families equally comfortable."

Seattle Metropolitan's Kathryn Robinson described the food as "not terribly" authentic, "but so cheap and tasty that nobody cares". The magazine's Allecia Vermillion included the restaurant in a 2021 list of "The Best Restaurants on Capitol Hill". Writers for The Infatuation included Fogón in a 2024 overview of the city's "most fun dinner spots".
