= Curry beef turnover =

Hong Kong pastry with curry beef filling

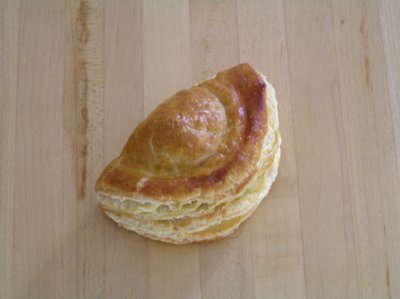
- Type: Hong Kong pastry /turnover
- Place of origin: Hong Kong
- Main ingredients: Curry beef
- Other information

Chinese name
- Chinese: 1. 咖喱酥; 2. 咖喱酥餃; 3. 咖喱角
- Jyutping: kaa1 lei1 sou1
- Hanyu Pinyin: gā lí sū
- Literal meaning: 1. Curry Puff; 2. Curry Jiaozi; 3. Curry Triangle
Transcriptions
Standard Mandarin
- Hanyu Pinyin: gā lí sū
Yue: Cantonese
- Jyutping: kaa1 lei1 sou1

A curry beef turnover or curry puff is a type of Chinese turnover.

The pastry is shaped in a half-moon crescent. It has curry beef filling in the center and is also crunchy on the outside. The outer shell is crispy and flaky. It is one of the standard pastries in Hong Kong. They are also available in Chinese bakeries.

== See also ==
- Curry puff, Southeast Asian pastry
- Samosa
- Crab rangoon
- List of pastries
