= Antipasto =

First course of a formal Italian meal

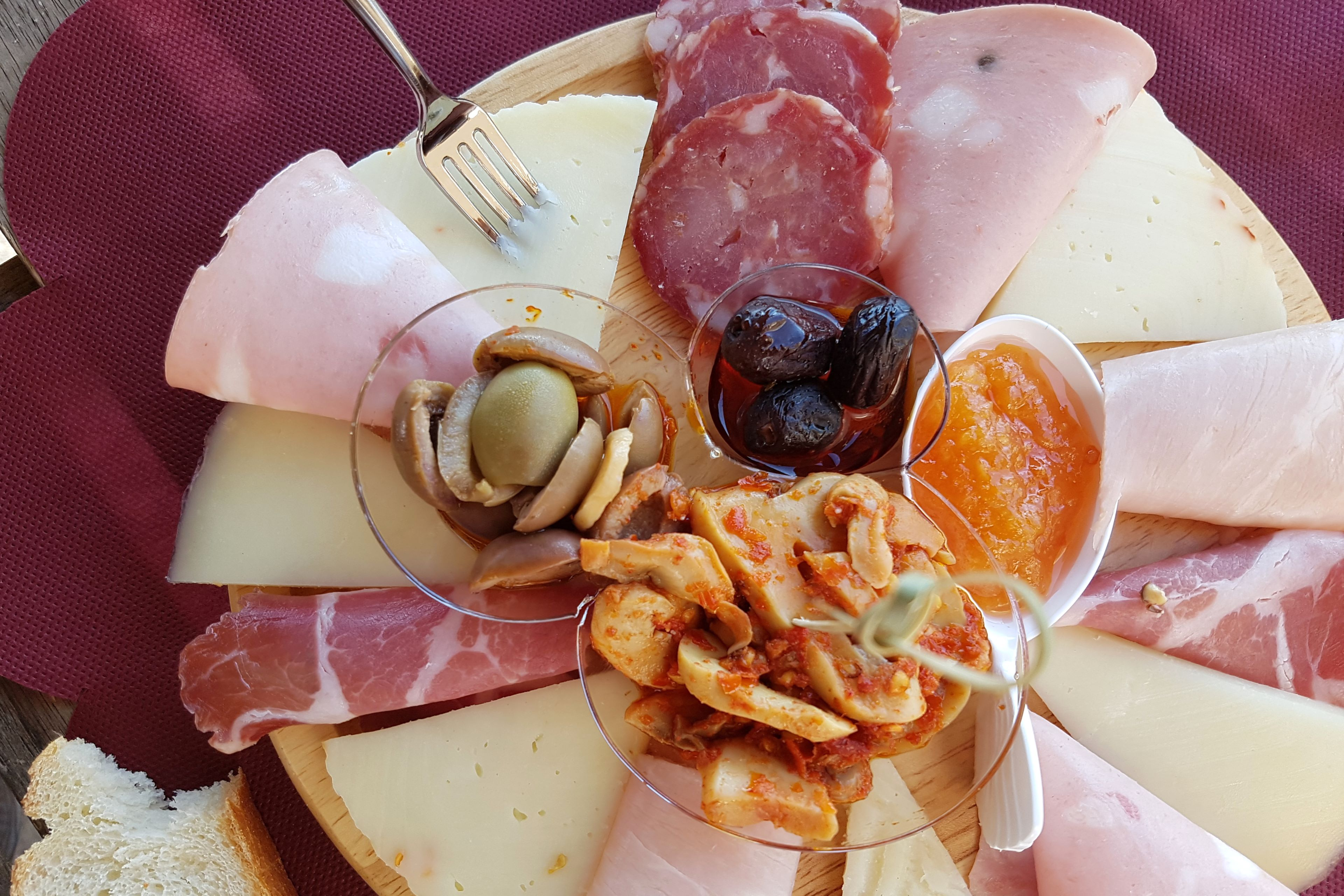
- Antipasto with mortadella, pecorino, salami, capocollo, olive and apricot jam
- Place of origin: Italy

An antipasto (pl.: antipasti) is the traditional first course of a formal Italian meal. Usually made of bite-size small portions and presented on a platter from which everyone serves themselves, the purpose of antipasti is to stimulate the appetite. The antipasto is typically followed by the primo piatto.

The contents of an antipasto vary greatly by region.

In Campania, antipasto is generally built around cheese served in various forms, including fried, sliced, and whole. In the region, antipasto is not necessarily eaten daily, but when hosting guests, small portions of dishes not technically considered antipasto is often served. Neapolitan cuisine holds battered, fried foods—croquettes, vegetables, dough—as the ideal antipasto. These are sold at neighbourhood establishments, and are purchased as Campanians return from work. Popular in Neapolitan antipasto is small peppers, preserved in vinegar, usually purchased from the shops rather than making at home. Other pickled vegetables that feature in such antipasto include fennel, aubergine, and carrot.

In northern Italy it is common to serve different types of cured meats and mushrooms and, especially near lakes, preparations of freshwater fish. The cheeses included also vary significantly between regions and backgrounds, and include hard and soft cheeses.

== See also ==
- List of hors d'oeuvre
- List of ancient dishes
- List of Italian dishes
