= Angels on horseback =

Bacon-wrapped oysters

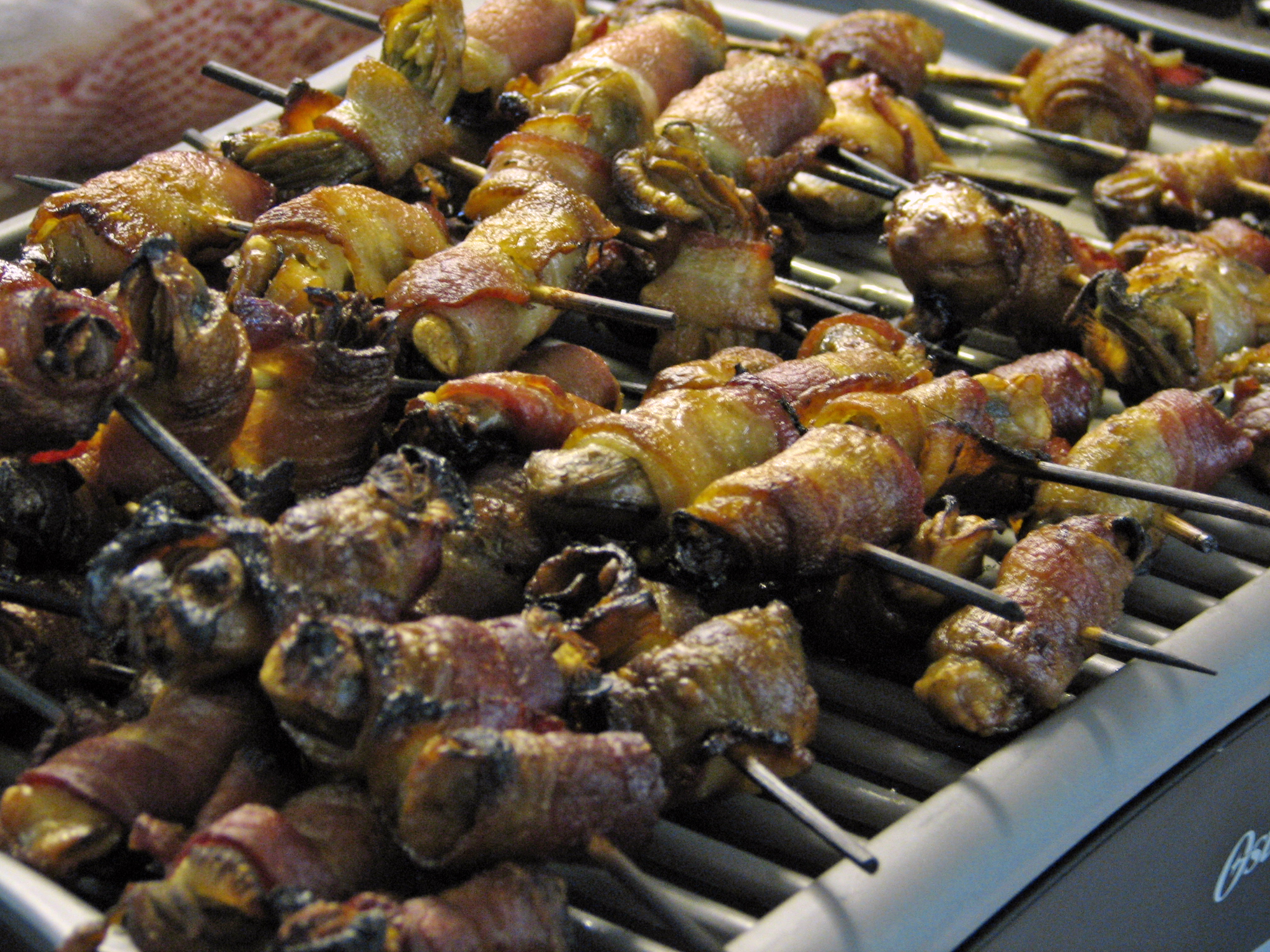
- Angels on horseback skewered and grilled.
- Course: Canapé, hors d'œuvre or savoury
- Serving temperature: Hot
- Main ingredients: Oysters, bacon
- Food energy (per serving): 677.8 J (162 cal)

Angels on horseback is a hot hors d'œuvre or savoury made of oysters wrapped with bacon. When served atop breads, it can be a canapé.

The dish is typically prepared by rolling shucked oysters in bacon and baking them in an oven. Modern variations of angels on horseback include skewering and frying. Serving can vary widely on either skewers or breads, with additional accompaniments or condiments. Angels on horseback differ from the fruit-based devils on horseback, but the dishes' names are sometimes erroneously considered synonyms.

== Classification ==
Angels on horseback can be served as an hors d'œuvre, as a canapé, or as a savoury. Angels on horseback are canapés when served with breads. In England, they are traditionally served as savouries; salty or savoury items served after the dessert meant to cleanse the palate before the serving of digestifs. One cookbook including angels on horseback as a savoury is the 1905 Savouries Simplified, by Constance Peel.

Angels on horseback should not be confused with devils on horseback. The latter dish, which is derived from the former, uses fruit, typically prunes or dates. American and British chefs including Martha Stewart and Martin Blunos recognise the distinction between the dishes, and though food writer John Ayto does too, he notes that the names have often been used interchangeably. This has been traced to a Chicago Tribune article and James Beard who "insisted that angels on horseback required ham as a wrapper, and that if bacon were used, what you'd have would be devils on horseback."

== History ==
The origins of the dish are unclear. The name most likely derives from the French anges à cheval, and there appears to be no significance in the oyster/angel and bacon/horse links. Its first occurrence, according to the Oxford English Dictionary and other sources, is in 1888, in Mrs Beeton's Book of Household Management. However, there is a reference in an Australian newspaper to the dish, which includes a brief recipe, from 1882.

References to angels on horseback in the United States date to the mid- to late 1890s. One of the earliest references in an American newspaper is an 1896 article from The New York Times, where the dish is suggested as an appetizer; according to the Times, the dish is to be credited to Urbain Dubois, the chef of the German Emperor, then Kaiser Wilhelm II. In this version, the angels on horseback are skewered, sprinkled with cayenne pepper, and broiled. The article suggests serving the dish with lemon and parsley, but without toast. In the 1930s, they are suggested as part of a picnic menu, and in 1948 again as an appetizer. In the 1950s, American newspapers featured the dish with interest, from papers including the Chicago Tribune, with the articles "For Oyster Treat, Try Angels on Horseback: They're Delectable Appetizer Sunday Menu", and "These Angels on Horseback Are Oysters", and the Los Angeles Times.

Angels on horseback did achieve a certain popularity in the 1960s in Washington, D.C.; Evangeline Bruce, wife of US ambassador and diplomatic envoy David K. E. Bruce and renowned for her "Washington soirees", served them regularly during the Kennedy administration but even there, the name itself was not commonplace, as suggested by the words of gossip columnist Liz Smith: "Sometimes the oysters were raw, sometimes they were grilled and wrapped in bacon. Then Mrs. Bruce called them Angels on Horseback." As late as the 1980s, the Chicago Tribune published an article calling the dish "intriguing", suggesting it had not yet become commonplace in the United States.

Publications from the 1990s onwards discuss angels on horseback as an indulgence or a delicacy. 1001 Foods to Die For noted it as an indulgence in North America due to the elevation of oysters to a delicacy status. The Diner's Dictionary: Word Origins of Food and Drink noted that the luxury of oysters results in cocktail sausages replacing the oysters.

== Preparation ==
According to the classic recipe, shucked oysters are wrapped in bacon which is then broiled in the oven, about three minutes per side. An early recipe, from 1902, suggests frying the skewered oysters and bacon in butter. The dish is often served on toast, though if prepared on skewers and broiled, it can be eaten straight from the skewer.

Variations on the preparation and presentation of the angels on horseback vary considerably. In Feng Shui Food, it is prepared by rolling a shucked oyster in bacon and skewering it with a cocktail stick, fried and served with a squeeze of lime. Joanna Pruess's book Seduced by Bacon includes a recipe for "Angels and Devils", with the suggestion that "a little hot red pepper sauce can transform them from heavenly to hellishly hot tasting, or somewhere inbetween." Myles Bader, author of The Wizard of Food's Encyclopedia of Kitchen & Cooking Secrets, suggests serving angels on horseback on toast with a lemon wedge or hollandaise sauce. An Italian variant replaces bacon with prosciutto.

== See also ==
- Bacon wrapped food
- List of hors d'oeuvre
- Oysters en brochette
