= Pigs in a blanket =

Sausage wrapped in pastry

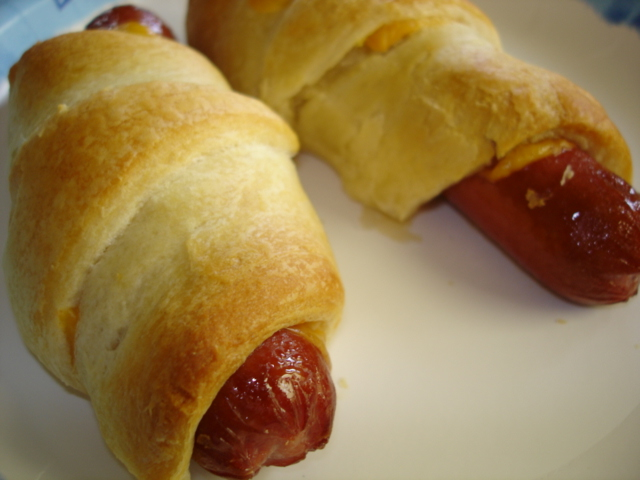
- Type: Sausage wrapped in pastry
- Course: Hors d'oeuvre
- Place of origin: United States
- Main ingredients: Cocktail sausage, hot dog, or other sausage, crescent rolls or other pastry
- Variations: Filled with cheese

In the United States, pigs in a blanket are small hot dogs or other sausages individually wrapped in pastry. It is commonly served as an appetizer.

== Ingredients and preparation ==
In the United States the term "pigs in a blanket" typically refers to hot dogs in croissant dough, but may include Vienna sausages, cocktail or breakfast/link sausages baked inside biscuit dough or croissant dough. American cookbooks from the 1800s have recipes for "little pigs in blankets", but this is a rather different dish of oysters rolled in bacon similar to angels on horseback. The modern version can be traced back to at least 1940, when a U.S. Army cookbook lists "Pork Sausage Links (Pigs) in Blankets".

The dough is sometimes homemade, but canned dough is most common. Pancake dough is also sometimes used, although this combination is more commonly served like a corn dog and sold as a pancake on a stick. The larger variety is served as a quick and easy main course or a light meal (particularly for children) at lunch or supper while the smaller version is served as an appetizer. In Texas, kolaches or klobasneks are a similar dish which originates from Czech immigrants. The meat or savory part, often a sausage but not always, is wrapped in kolache dough and not croissant dough. This dish in Texas is most commonly referred to as "kolache", although traditional Czech-style kolaches are a sweet dish, not a savory dish.

== Serving ==
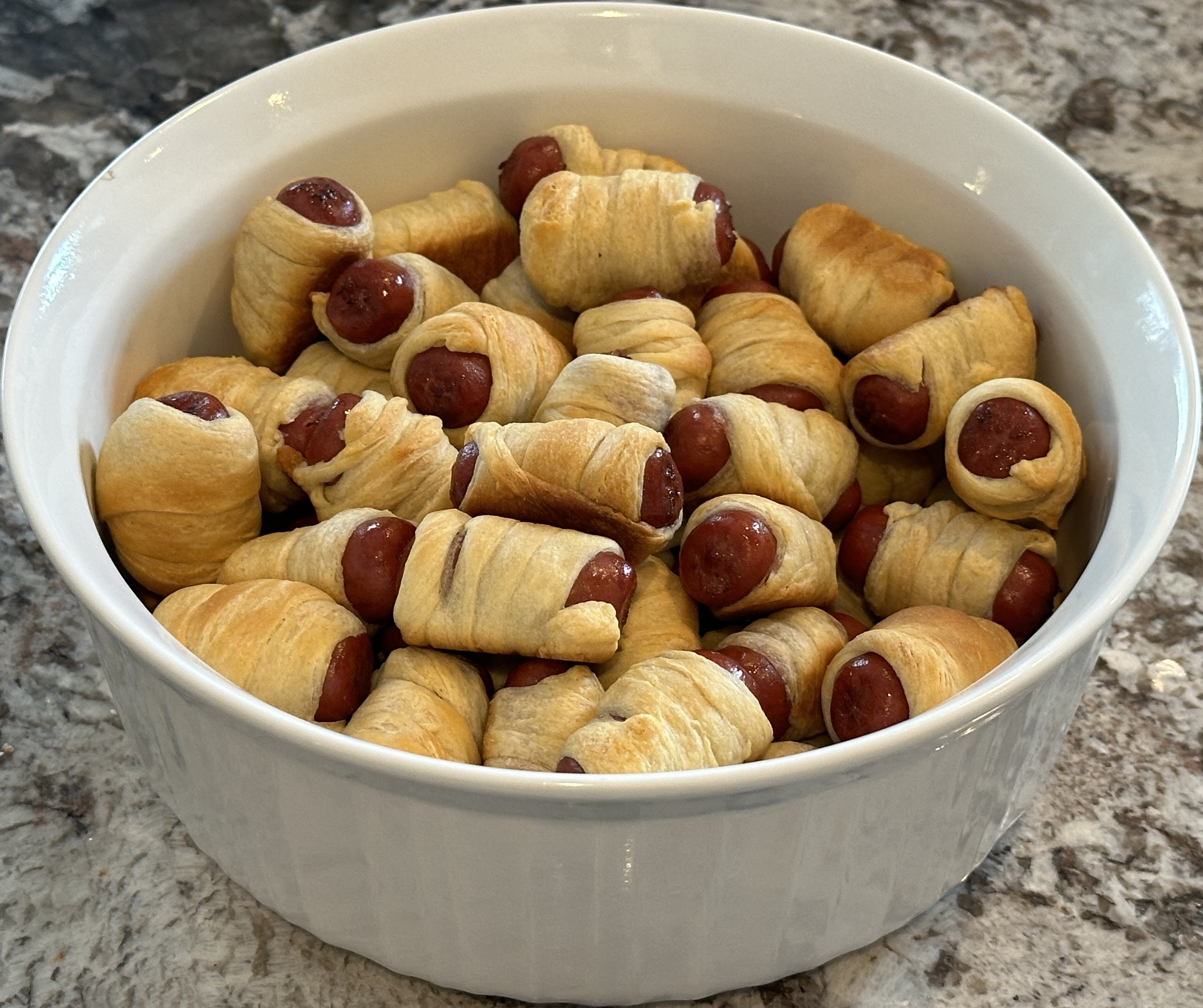
A bowl of pigs in a blanket

Smaller versions of the dish are commonly served as an appetizer or hors d'oeuvre, sometimes with a mustard or aioli dipping sauce, or are accompanied by other foods during the main course.

== Similar dishes ==
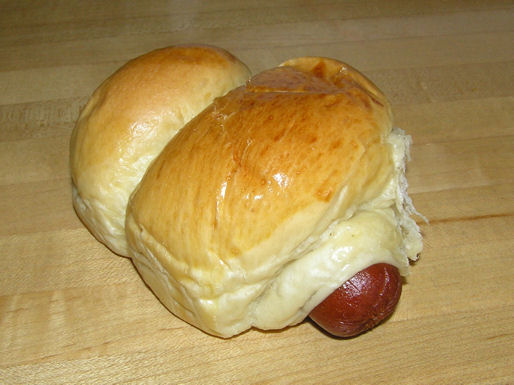
A sausage bun (cheung jai baau) from Hong Kong

The cuisines of a number of countries have similar dishes under a variety of names.

In Belgium, this is a traditional dish from the city of Namur, where it is called avisance. Historically it was a sausage or sausage meat in bread dough, replaced nowadays with puff pastry.

In Denmark, Norway, and Sweden, a hot dog wrapped in bread is called a fransk hot dog (lit. 'french hot dog'). The name is a reference to the bread's similarity to a baguette. In Denmark and Norway, American-style pigs in a blanket are known as pølsehorn, meaning "sausage horns".

The German Würstchen im Schlafrock ("sausage in a dressing gown") uses sausages wrapped in puff pastry or, more rarely, pancakes. Cheese and bacon are sometimes present.

In the Netherlands, Saucijzenbroodje is a puff pastry roll filled with seasoned minced meat.

In Australia, New Zealand, Canada and the United Kingdom, pastry-wrapped sausage meat is known as a sausage roll.

== See also ==
- Bagel dog
- Corn dog
- Hot dog
- Egg in the basket
- Galette-saucisse
- Klobasnek
- Pepperoni roll
- Sausage roll
- List of bread dishes
- List of sausage dishes
- List of stuffed dishes
- Toad in the hole
