= Savoury (dish) =

Course in an English formal meal

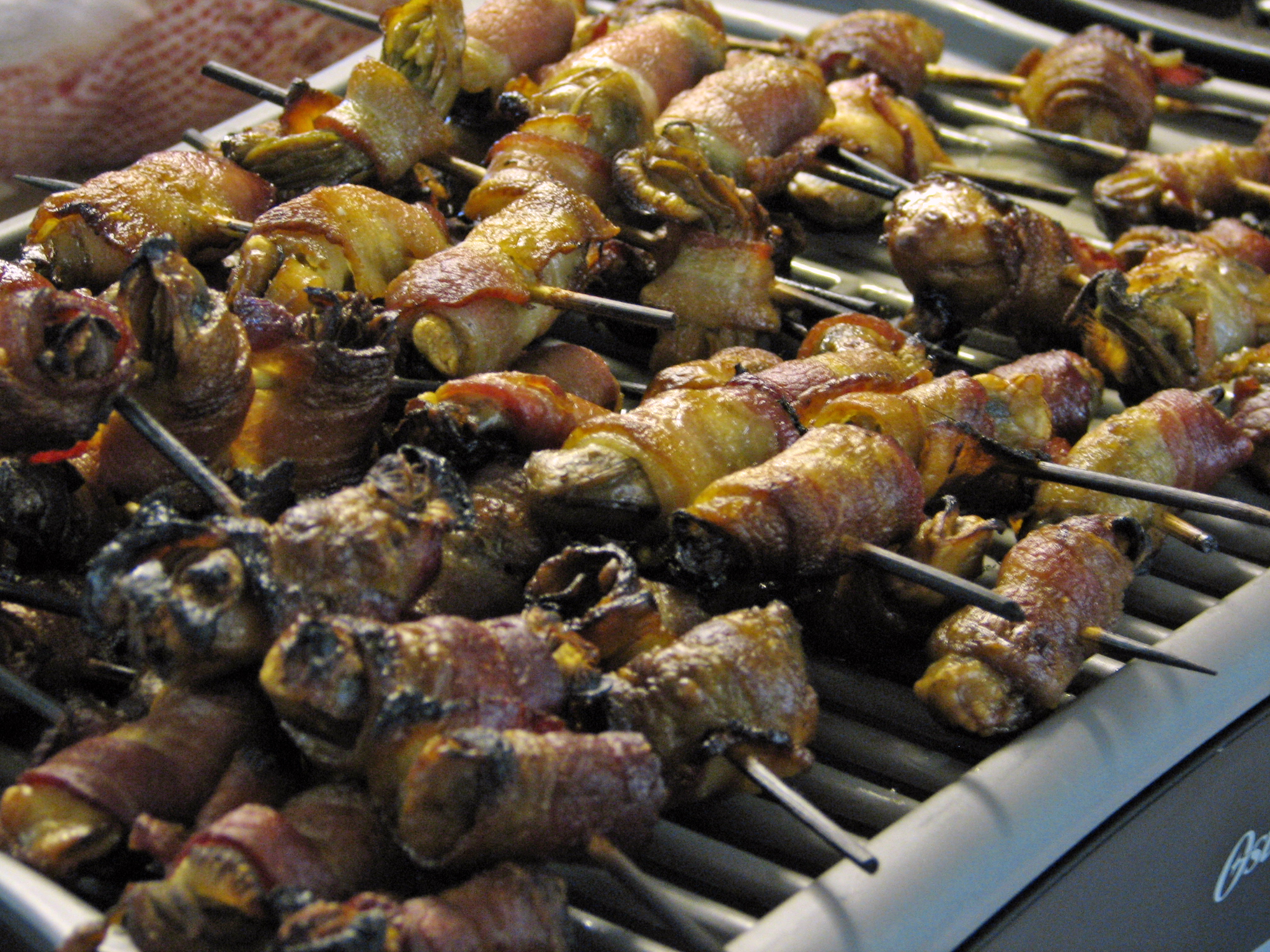
Angels on horseback

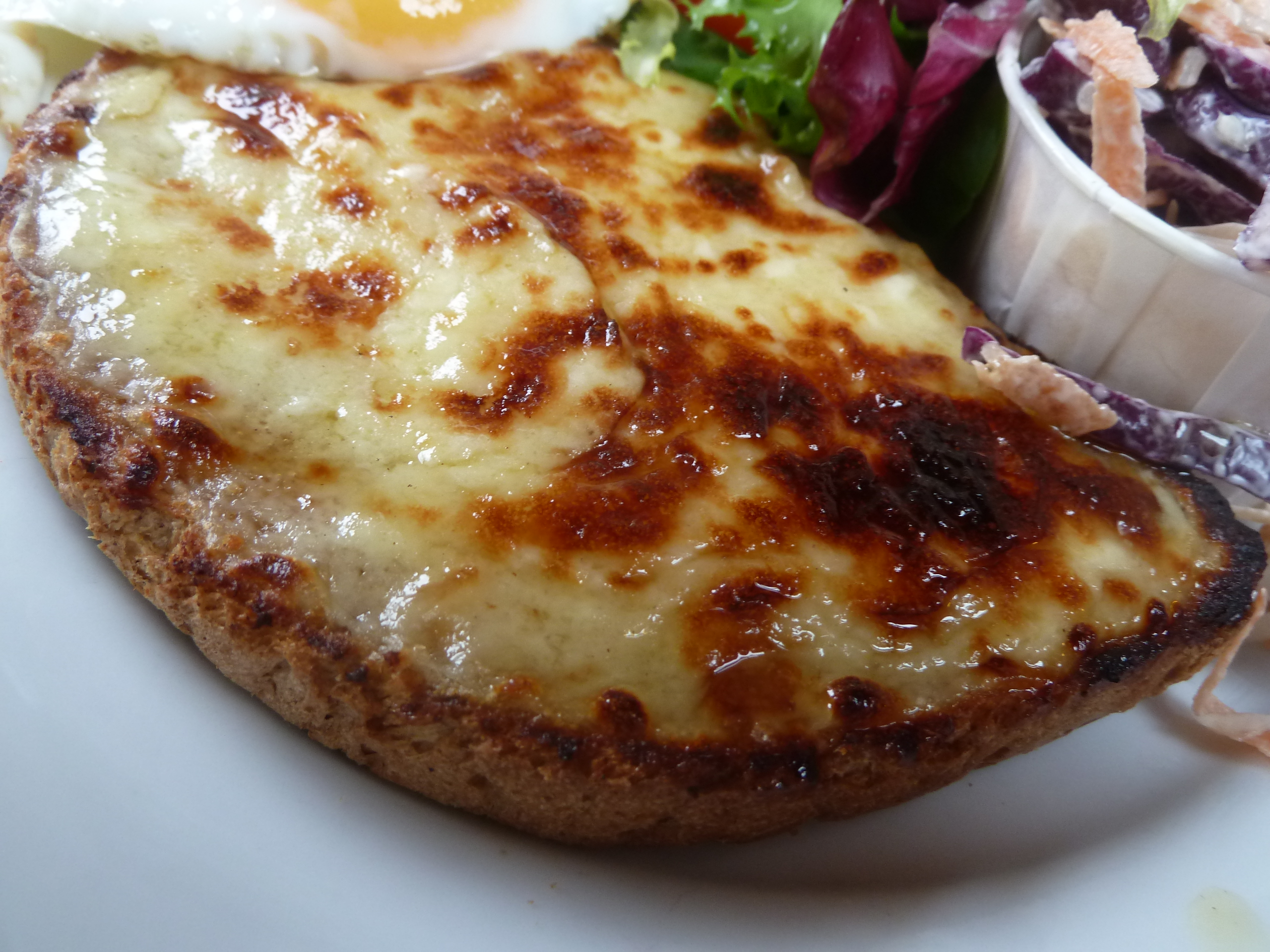
Welsh rarebit

A savoury is the final course of a traditional English formal meal, following the sweet pudding or dessert course. The savoury is designed to "clear the palate" before the port, whisky or other digestif is served. It generally consists of rich, highly spiced or salty elements. While the popularity of savouries has waned since their height during Victorian times, there has recently been a renewed interest in savouries.

Typical savouries include:

- Angels on horseback, oysters wrapped in bacon
- Devils on horseback, dates, prunes or other dried fruit wrapped in bacon
- Scotch woodcock, scrambled eggs on toast spread with anchovy paste
- Welsh rarebit, hot cheese sauce, ale, mustard, or Worcestershire sauce, served on toasted bread.

The 1669 cookbook The Closet of the Eminently Learned Sir Kenelme Digbie Kt. Opened includes an entry for 'Savoury Tosted or Melted Cheese', a dish of melted well-flavoured cheese and butter, optionally with the addition of asparagus, bacon, onions or anchovies, and scorched at the top with a hot fire-shovel, served with toasts or crusts of white bread.

In Eliza Acton's 1845 book Modern Cookery for Private Families, there is a recipe for savoury toasts. In the 20th century, entire books on the subject appeared, such as Good Savouries (1934) by Ambrose Heath.

In contrast to many elements of wider British cuisine, the savoury as a distinct course never spread beyond England and was therefore regarded as peculiar to English cuisine and emblematic of upper-class dining.
