= Sautéed mushrooms =

Dish

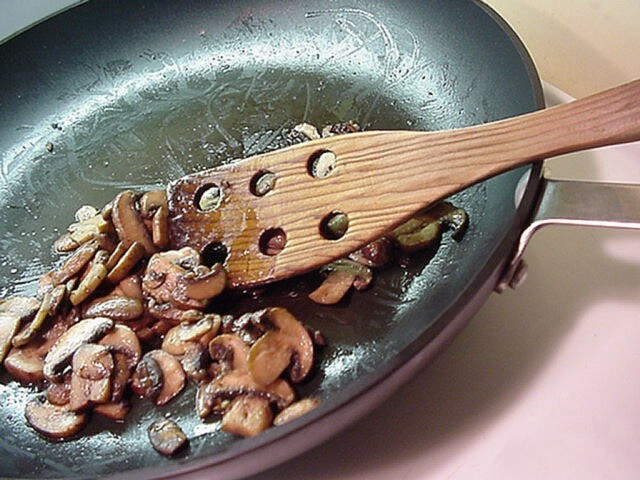
- Baby bella (portobello) mushrooms being sautéed
- Alternative names: Champignons sautés au beurre
- Type: Dish
- Course: Side dish
- Main ingredients: Mushrooms
- Ingredients generally used: Butter

Sautéed mushrooms (French: champignons sautés au beurre) is a dish prepared by sautéing edible mushrooms. It is served as a side dish, used as an ingredient in dishes such as coq au vin, beef bourguignon, and foods such as duxelles; as a topping for steaks and toast; and also as a garnish.

== Overview ==
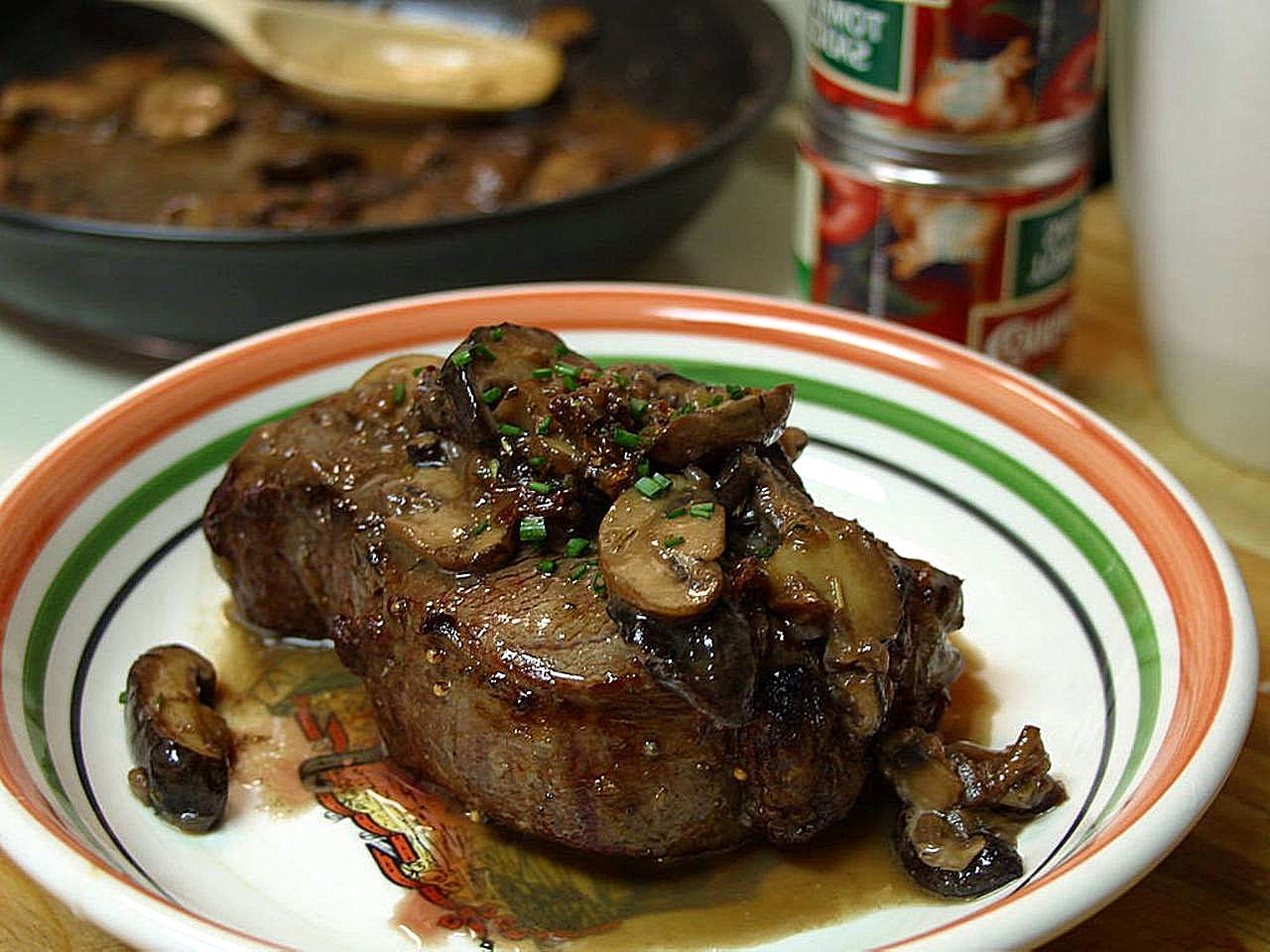
A steak topped with sautéed shiitake mushrooms

Sautéed mushrooms is a common dish prepared by the sautéing of sliced or whole edible mushrooms. Butter is typically used when sautéing the dish, and margarine and cooking oils such as olive oil and canola oil are also used. Clarified butter can be used, as can a mixture of oil and butter. The dish is typically cooked over a high heat until the mushrooms are browned, with the oil or butter being very hot in a pan before the mushrooms are added. Overcooking may create an inferior dish by causing the mushrooms to lose moisture and becoming shriveled.

During the cooking process, the dish can be deglazed with the use of wine, and wine can be used as an ingredient in and of itself without deglazing. The dish can be flavored with lemon juice, various herbs and seasonings, salt and pepper. Additional ingredients such as minced green onions and shallots can also be used. The dish is vegetarian, and may have a meat-like texture.

== Uses ==
Sautéed mushrooms is sometimes served as a side dish, and is also used as an ingredient in the preparation of dishes and foods such as beef bourguignon, coq au vin, poulet en cocotte, Poulet Saute Chasseur, soups and stews, sauces, and duxelles, a paste prepared by sautéing mushrooms, onions, shallots, and herbs in butter. Sautéed mushrooms is also used as a topping for cooked steaks and toast, as a side dish meant to specifically accompany steaks, and as a garnish. The dish can serve to add significant flavor to various dishes, in part per the glutamic acid present in the cells of edible mushrooms (see also: glutamate flavoring).

== Gallery ==
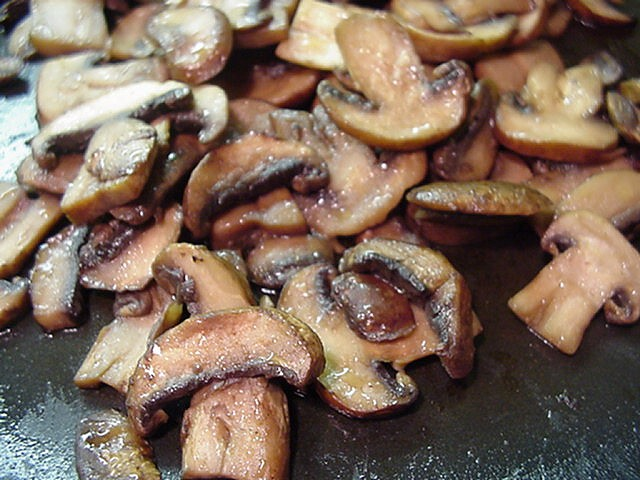
A close-up view of sautéed baby bella mushrooms

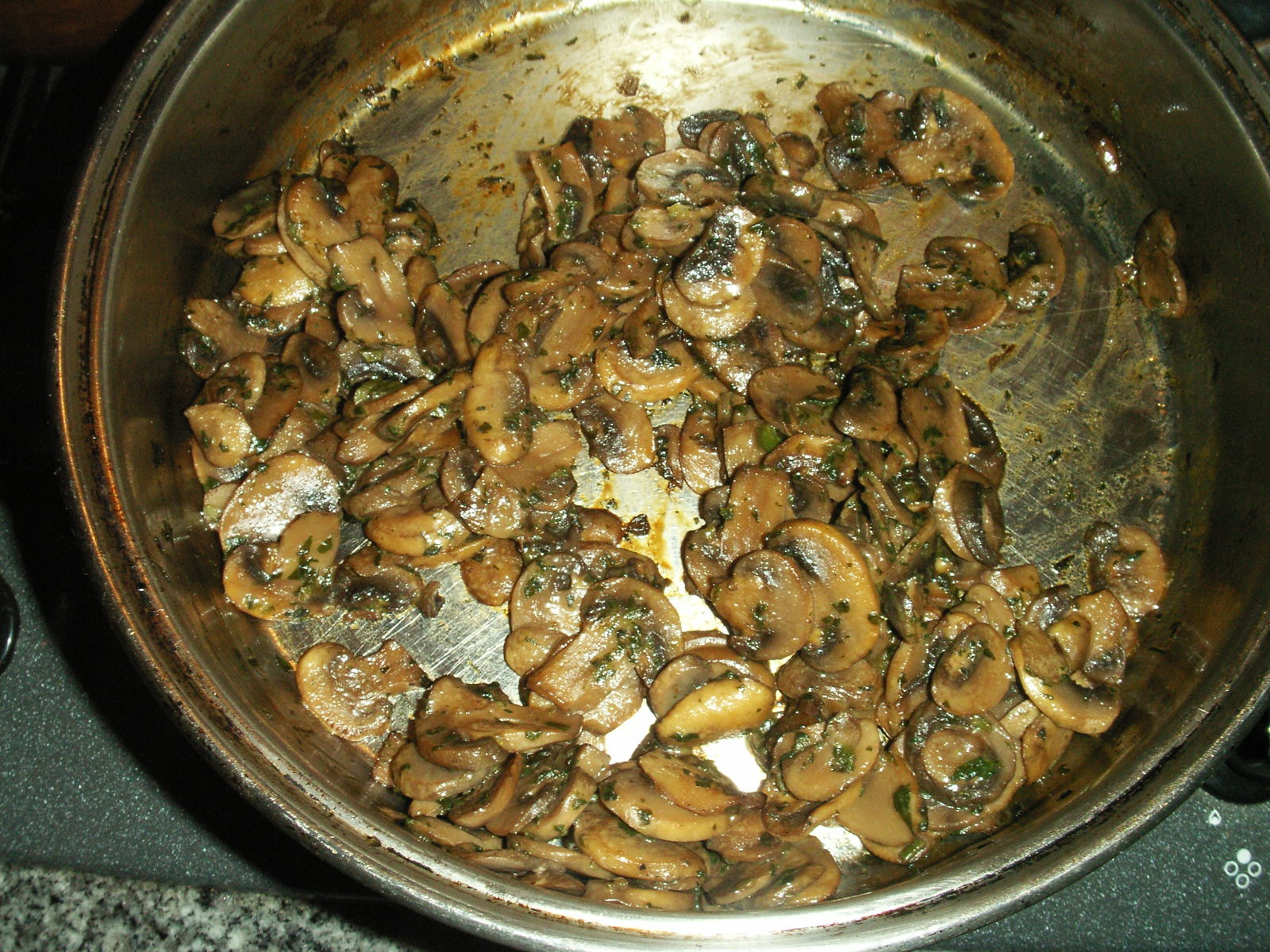
Sautéed champignon mushrooms

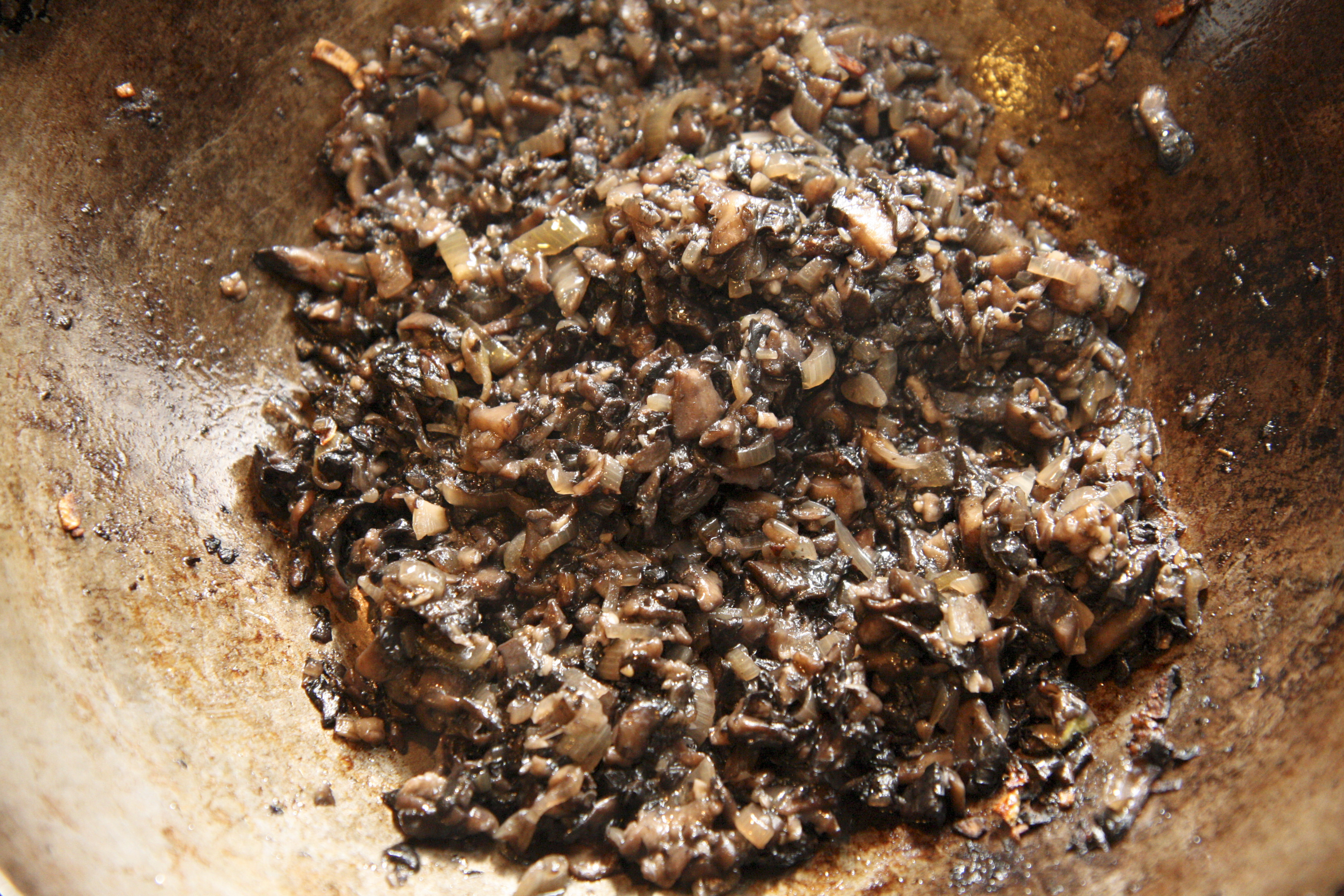
Duxelles being cooked

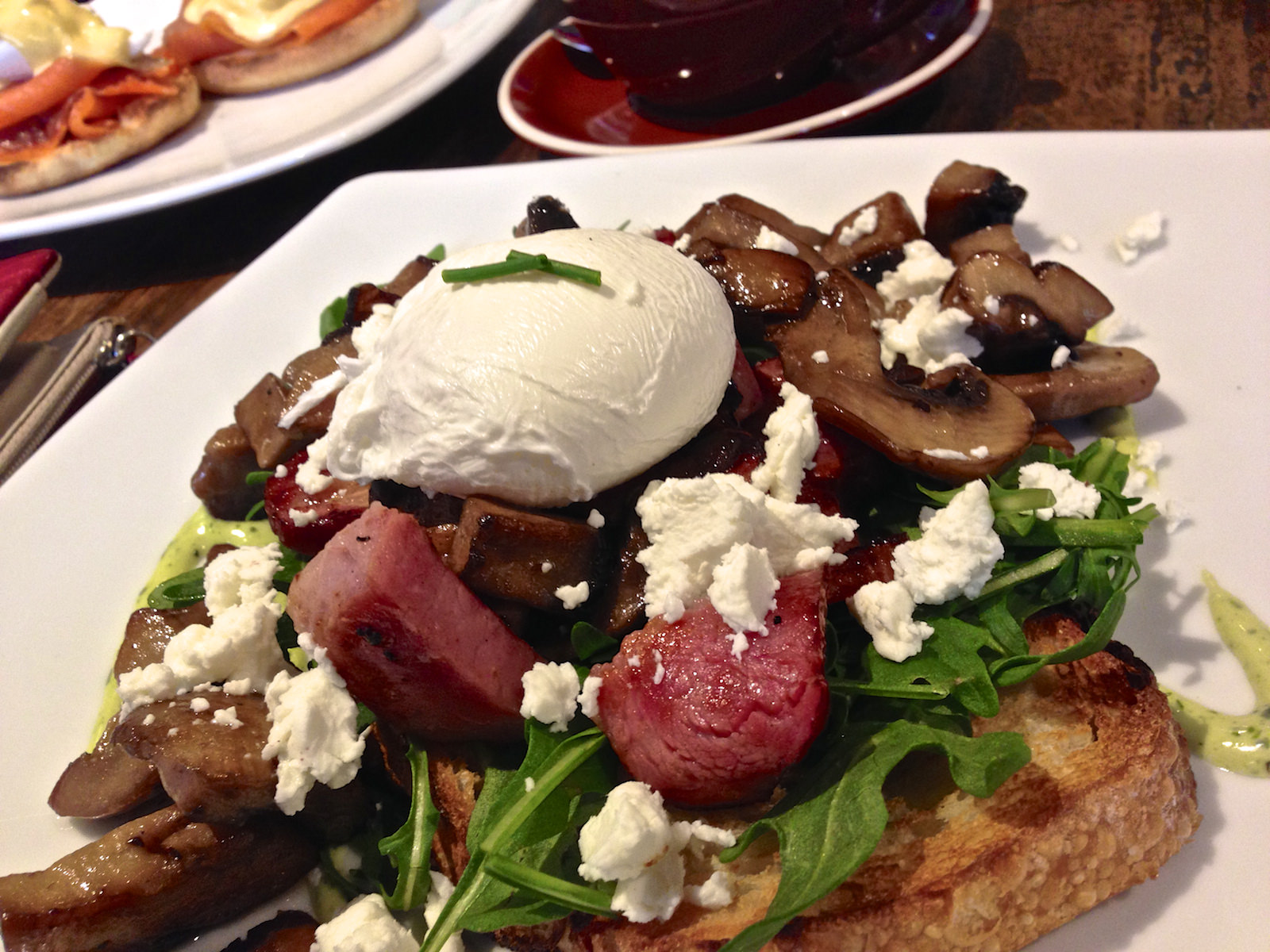
Sautéed field mushrooms on toast, with several additional ingredients

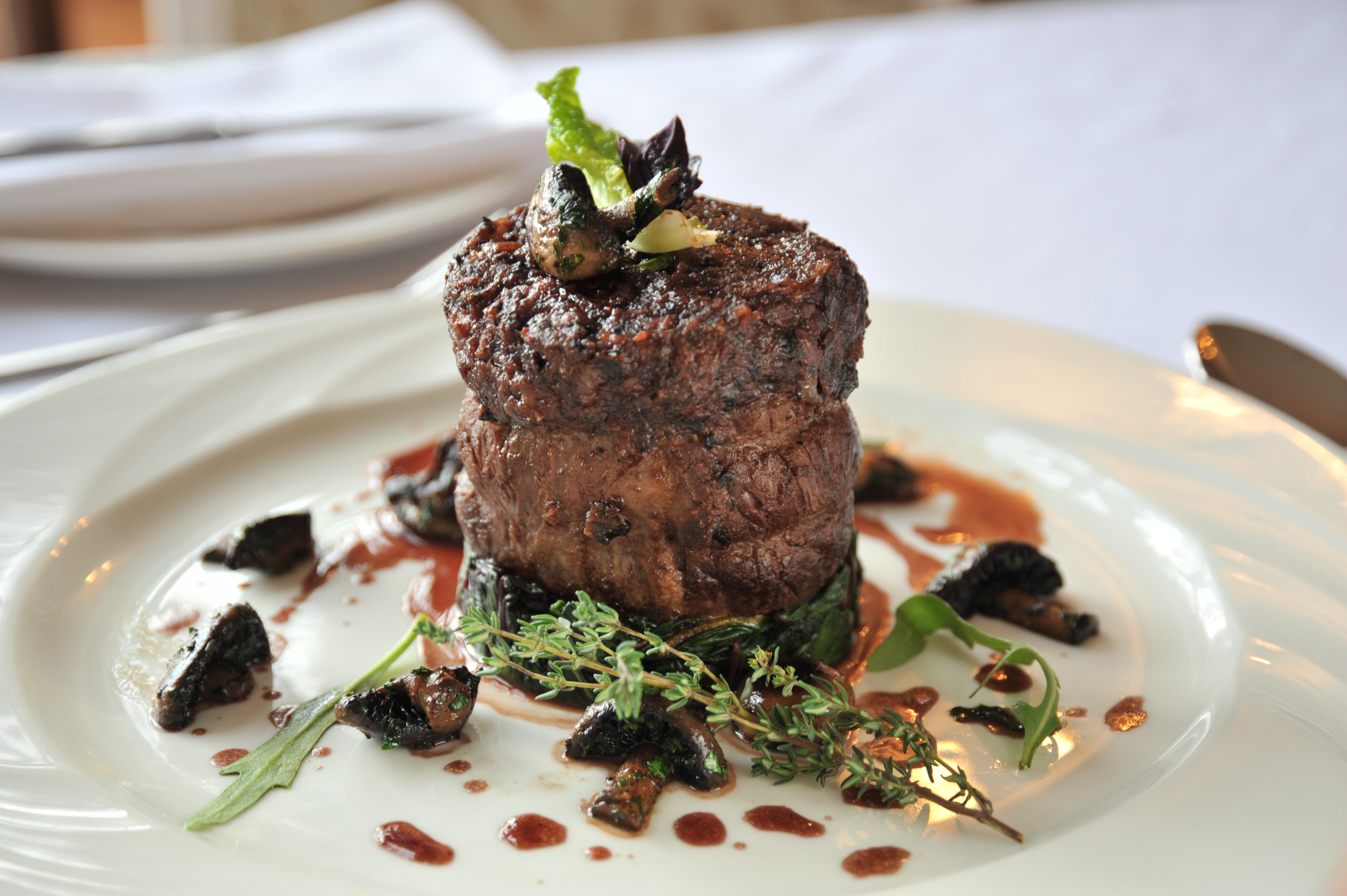
A beef fillet garnished with sautéed mushrooms

== See also ==
- Stuffed mushrooms
- List of mushroom dishes
