= List of mushroom dishes =

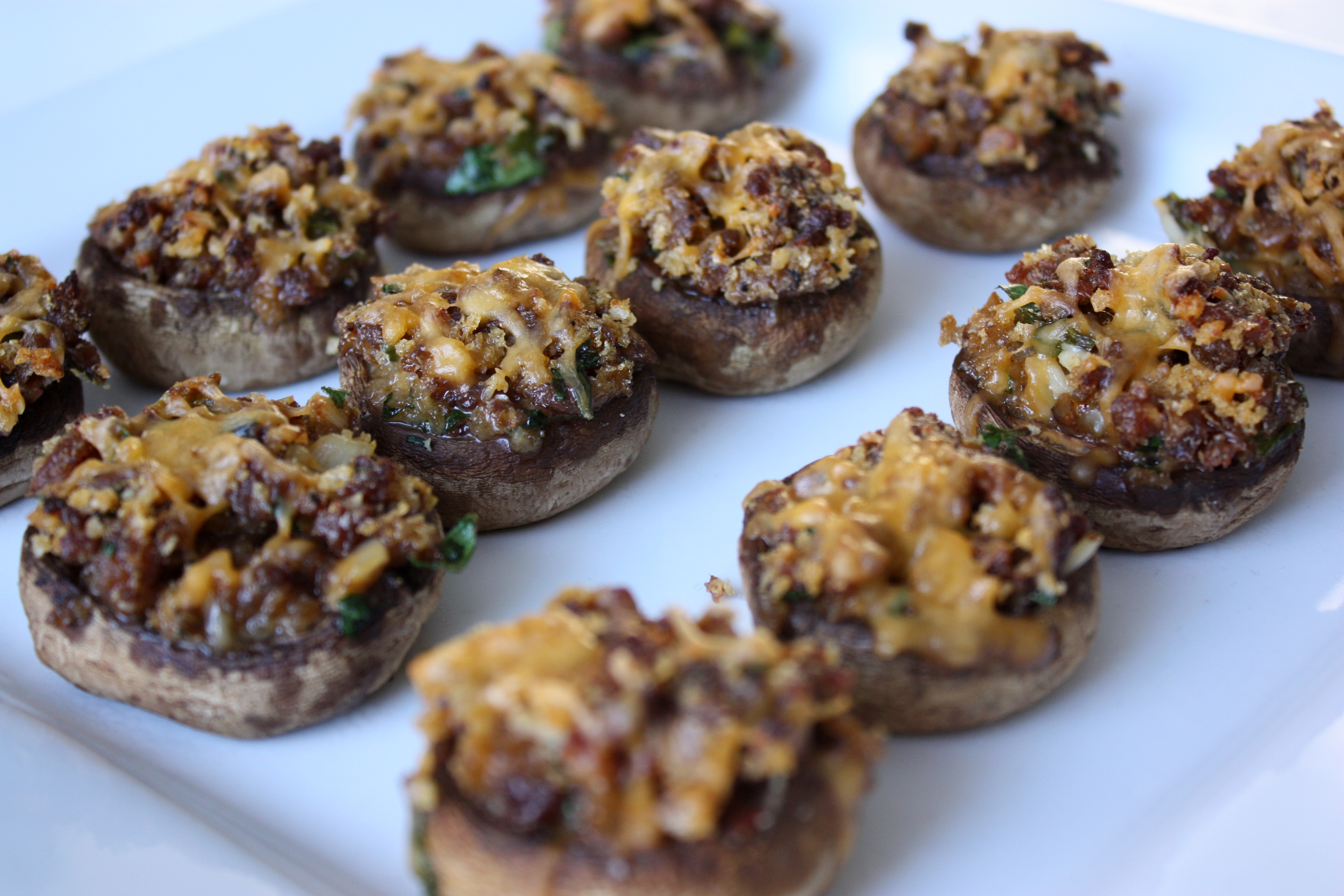
Sausage-stuffed mushrooms

This is a list of notable mushroom dishes and foods, comprising foodstuffs prepared using mushrooms as a primary ingredient.

Edible mushrooms have variety of benefits when consumed. They have essential nutrients we need for a healthy life, including protein, vitamins B, C and D, and selenium, which helps prevent cancer. They are a good source of iron, copper, riboflavin, niacin and contain dietary fiber. One portobello mushroom can contain more potassium than a banana.

In many cultures, mushroom picking is an important tradition and can be a substantial source of income. In the Pacific Northwest of the United States, it is estimated that, in some situations, the value of the yearly mushroom harvest in a forest can equal the value of lumber it can produce. According to the "Menus of Change" initiative of The Culinary Institute of America and the Harvard School of Public Health Department of Nutrition, pairing the evidence for health- and sustainability-linked food choices with flavor, other culinary, and demographic trends and plausible business scenarios allows flavor-rich, largely plant-based food and menu choices to emerge. Mushrooms, with their unique sensory and culinary properties, may help Americans move toward healthier, plant-based choices. Of particular interest are the high amounts of both glutamates (not as monosodium glutamate) and ribonucleotides in A. bisporus. Glutamate and certain 5′-ribonucleotides are taste-active chemicals responsible for umami flavours. Calcium diglutamate, in particular, was shown to improve the flavor of low-sodium products.

== Mushroom dishes ==
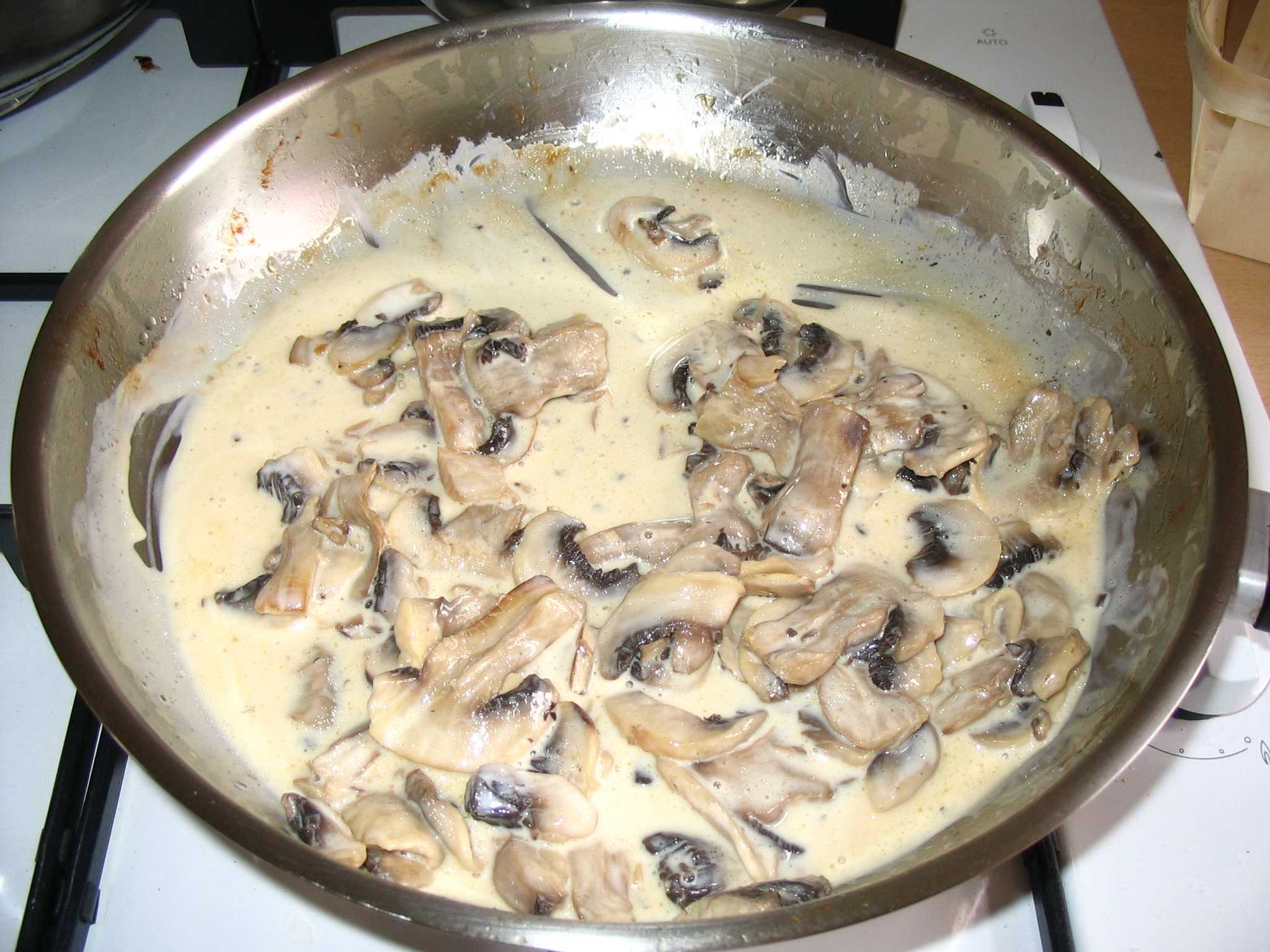
Mushroom sauce being prepared

- Ciulama – mainly found in Romanian and Moldovan cuisine, this dish is prepared with poultry or mushrooms
- Coulibiac with mushrooms - Russian pirog filled with mushrooms
- Cream of mushroom soup – simple cream soup prepared using mushrooms
- Diri ak djon djon – Haitian Creole for rice with mushrooms; a native dish of Haiti
- Duxelles – finely chopped (minced) mixture of mushrooms or mushroom stems, onions, shallots, and herbs sautéed in butter, and reduced to a paste
- Fried mushrooms – mushrooms dipped in batter and fried, typically served in Canada, the United Kingdom, and the United States with a dipping sauce on the side. Fried mushrooms prepared tempura-style are also common in Japan.
- Marinated mushrooms – chopped mushrooms marinated with spices, popular in Russian cuisine under brands Uniservis and Mikado
- Mushroom broth – Soup base made from mushrooms instead of animals or plants, used in vegan ramen
- Mushroom burger – burger made with mushrooms as a meat substitute; can be a thick slice of a portobello or a patty made of minced mushrooms
- Mushroom gravy – mushroom-based sauce
- Mushroom ketchup – style of ketchup prepared with mushrooms as its primary ingredient. Originally, ketchup in the United Kingdom was prepared with mushrooms, instead of tomato, the main ingredient in contemporary preparations of ketchup.
- Mushroom sauce – often cream-based
- Oysters en brochette – variation of the dish whereby it is prepared with mushrooms on the skewers, rather than bacon, and also with both mushrooms, bacon, chunks of tomato, and/or cubes of cooked ham.
- Sautéed mushrooms – flavorful dish prepared by sautéing mushrooms in butter or oil
- Selsko meso – Macedonian and Balkan pork and mushroom dish
- Stuffed mushrooms – myriad fillings are used in this baked dish
- Veal Orloff – consists of a braised loin of veal, thinly sliced, filled with a thin layer of pureed mushrooms and onions between each slice

== Gallery ==
Mushroom dishes and foods

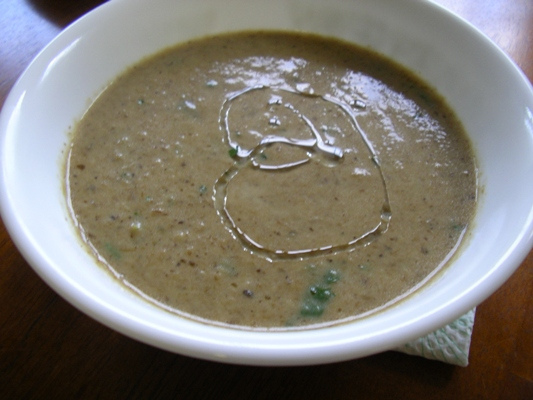
Cream of mushroom soup prepared with wild, edible mushrooms

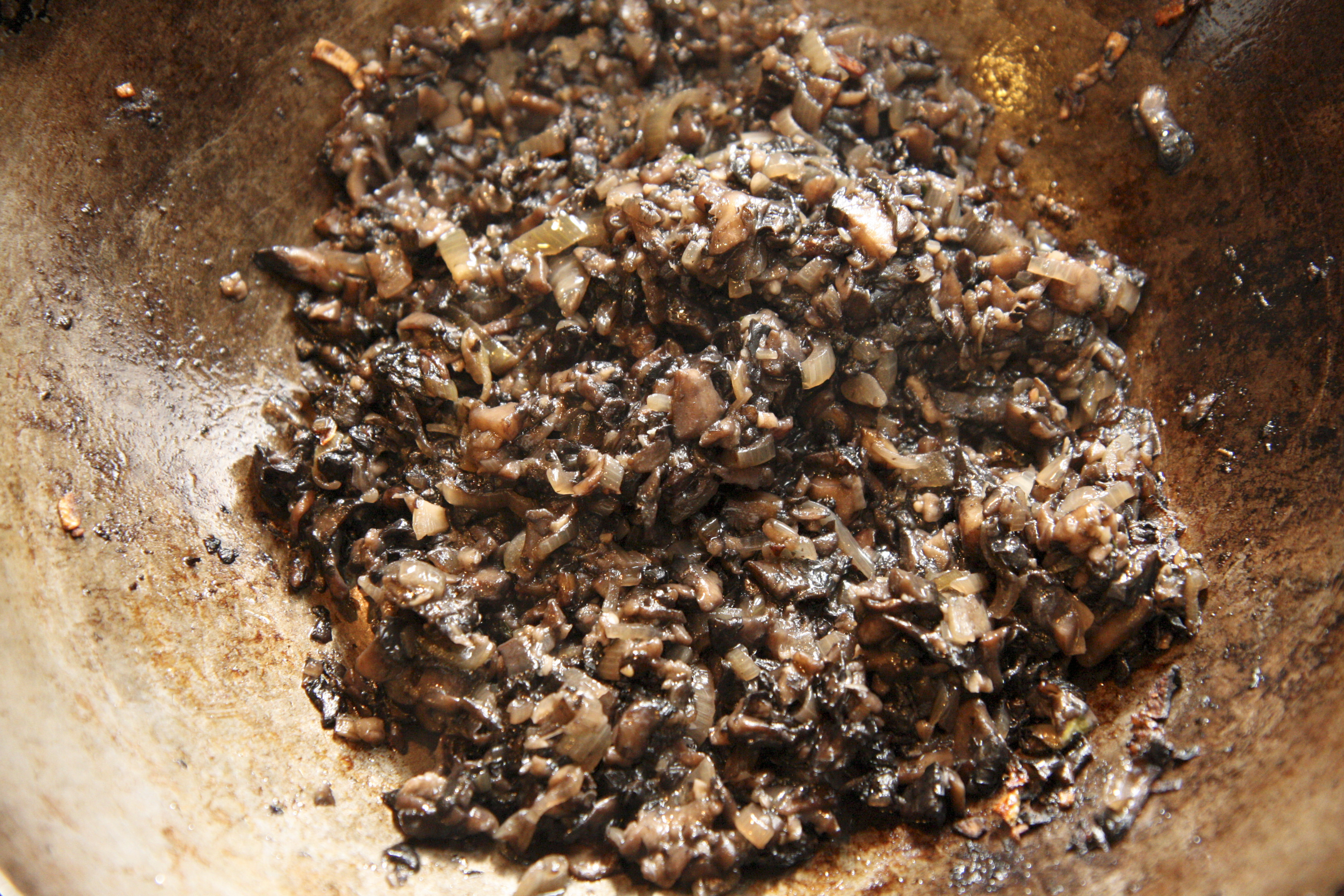
Duxelles

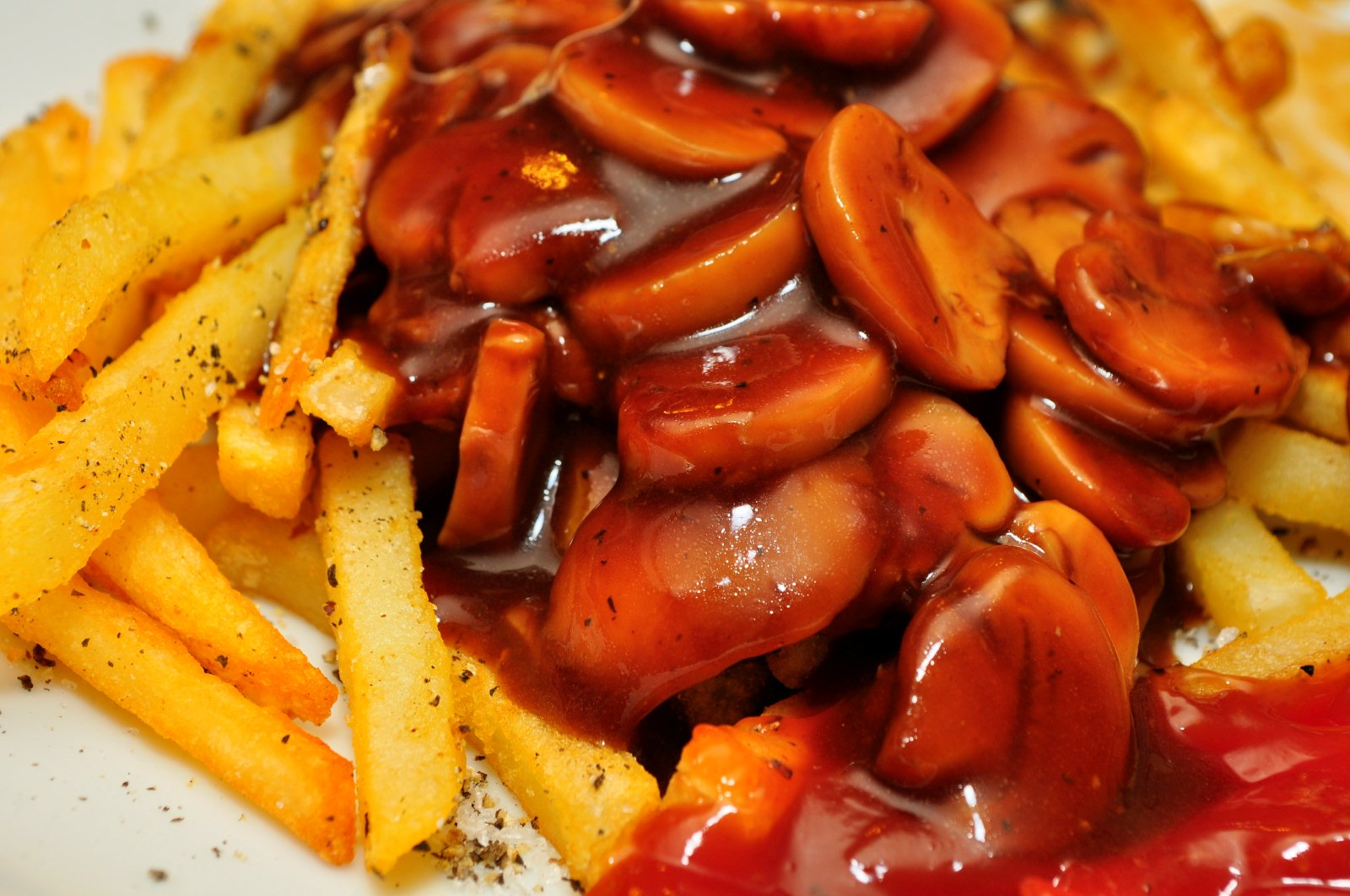
Mushroom gravy atop French fries

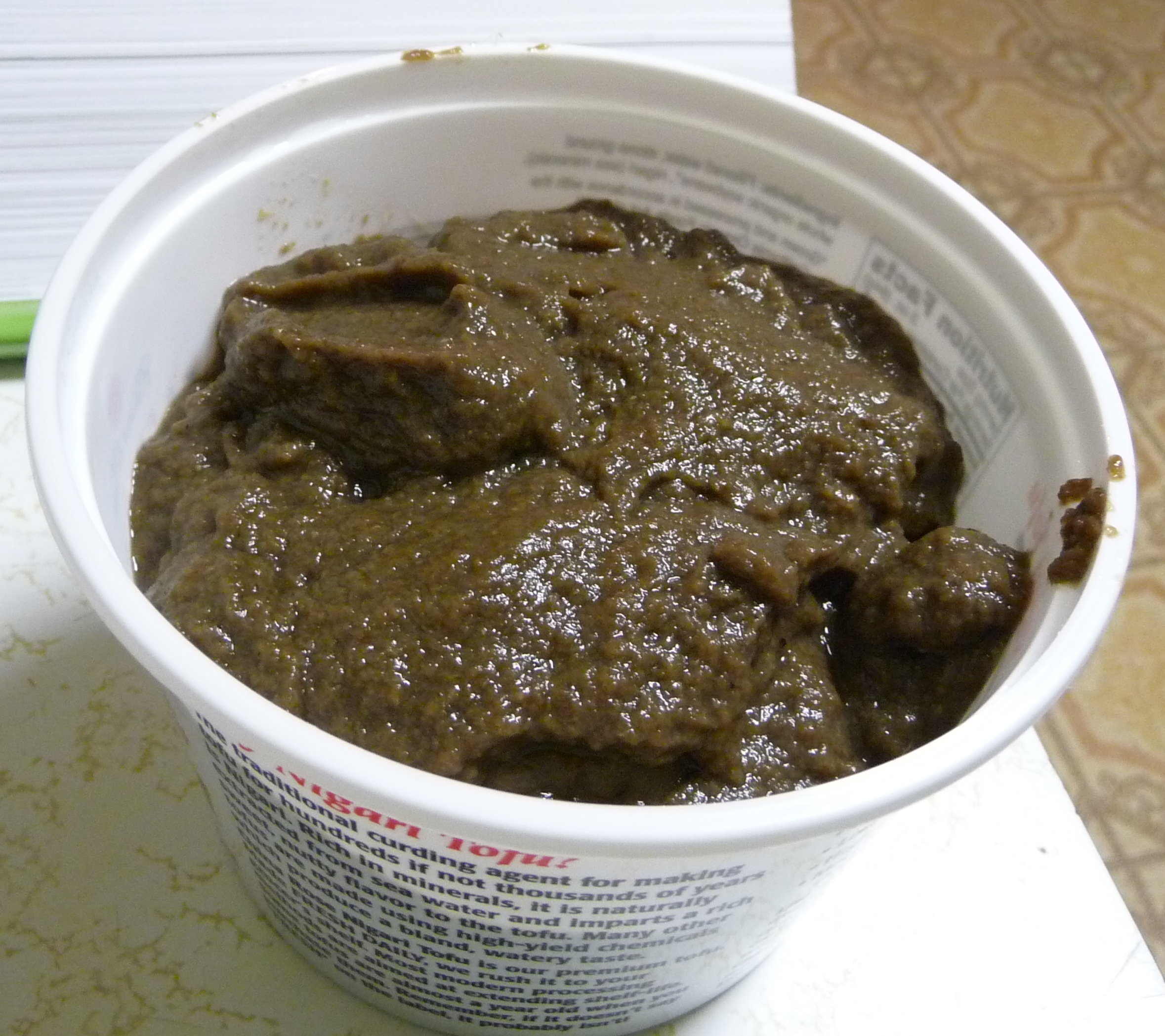
Mushroom ketchup in a plastic tub

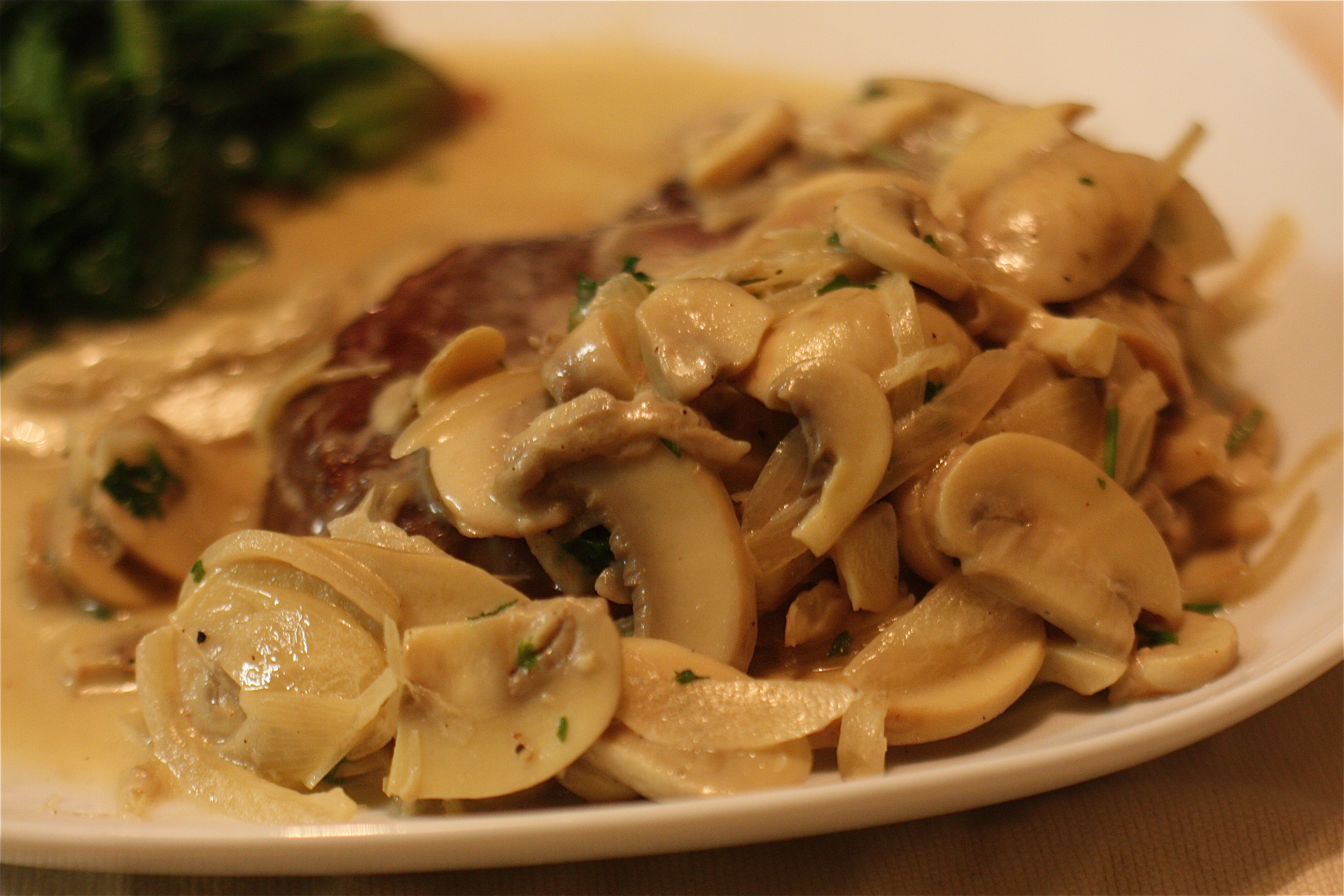
Filet mignon with a chunky, cream-based mushroom sauce

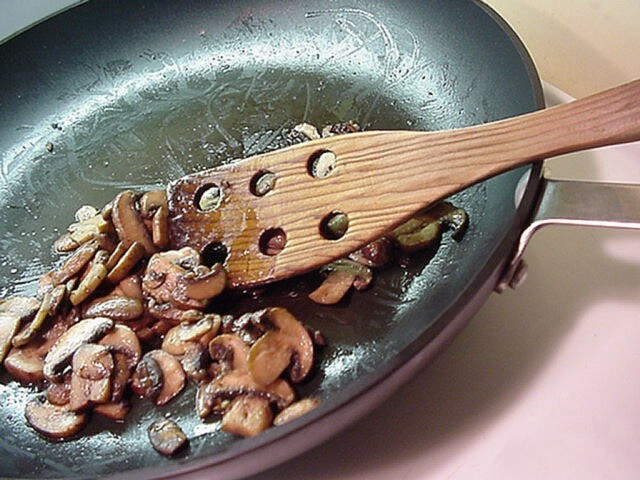
Sautéed mushrooms

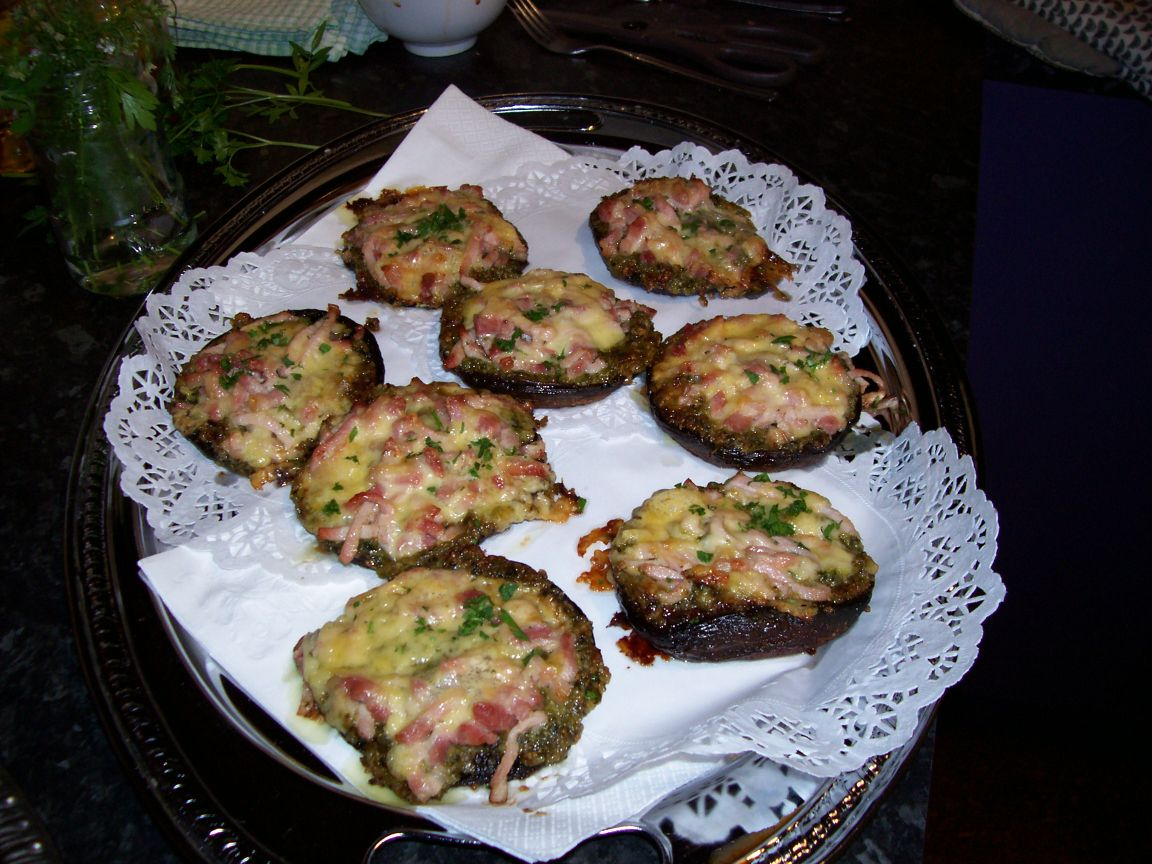
Stuffed mushroom cap

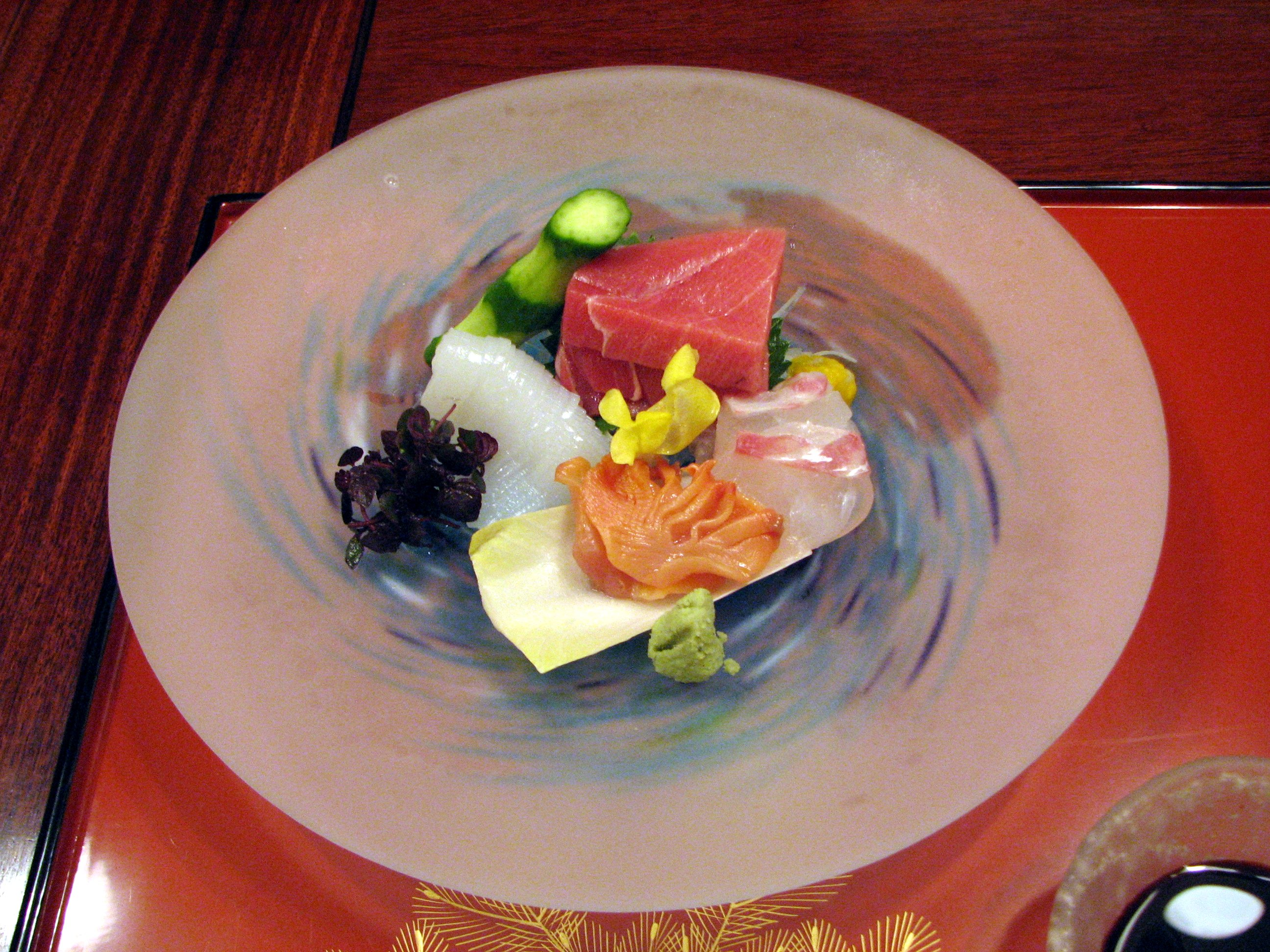
Jisaku Kaiseki Ryori

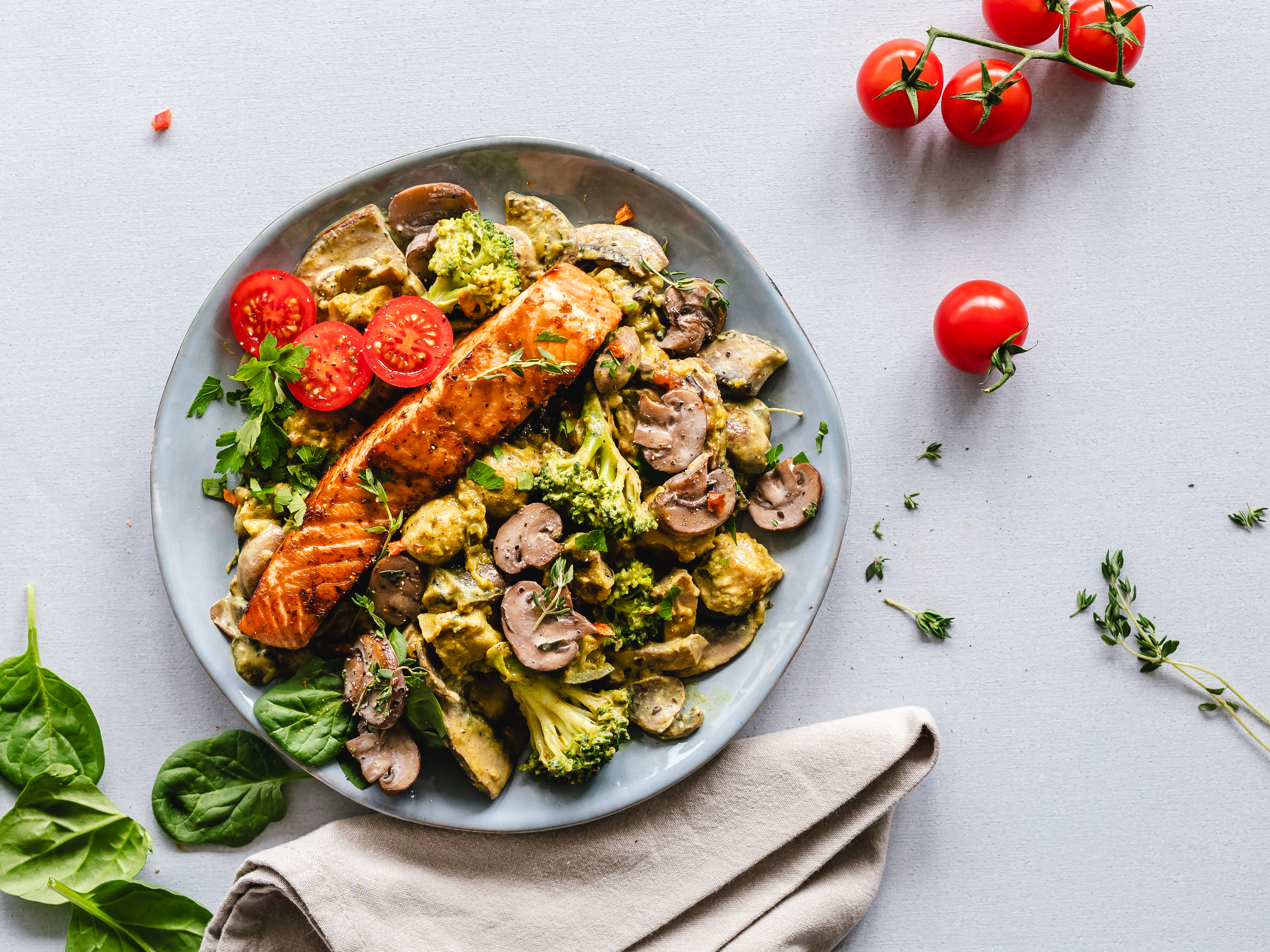
Mushroom salmon dish

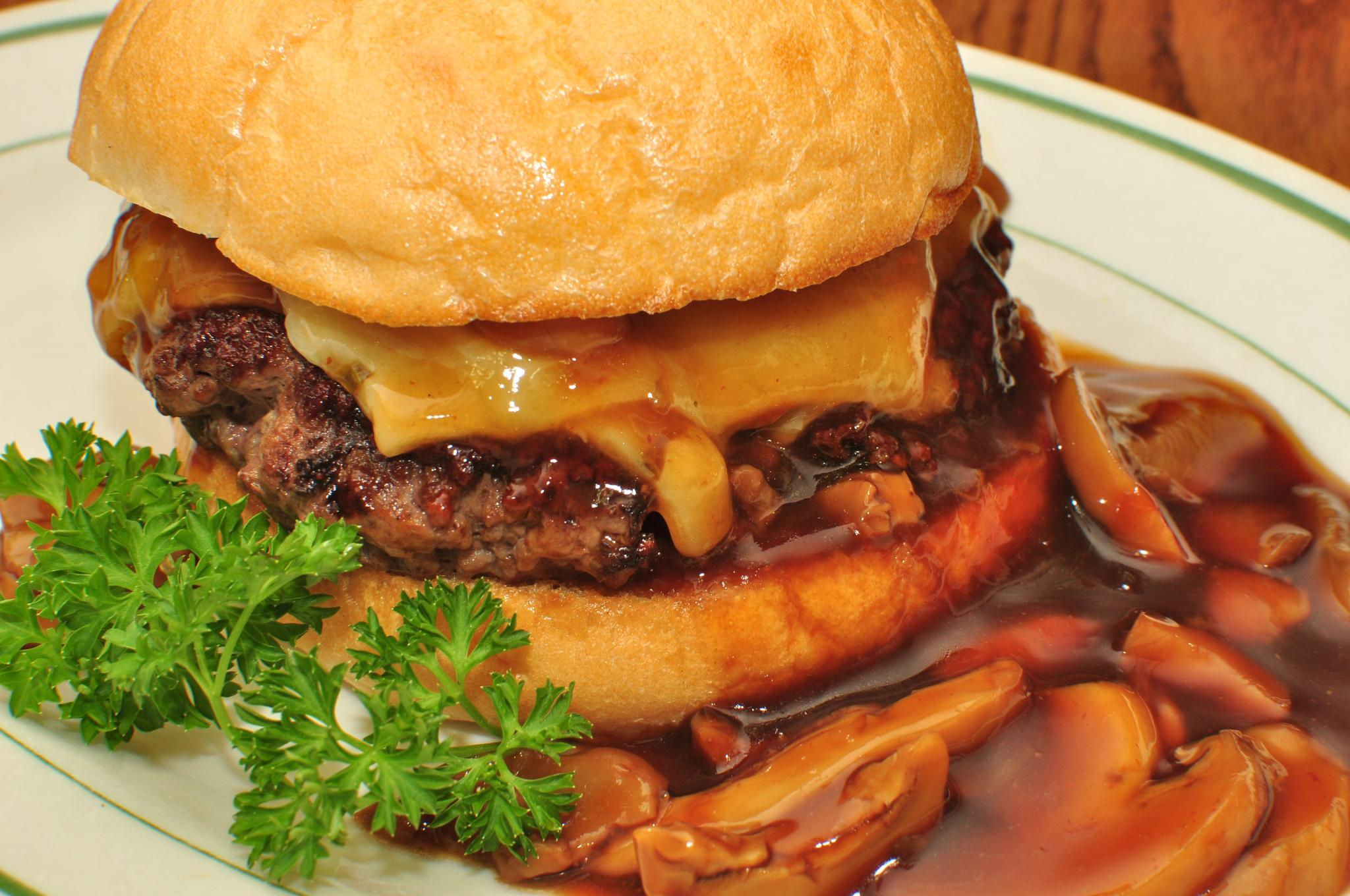
Mushroom cheeseburger

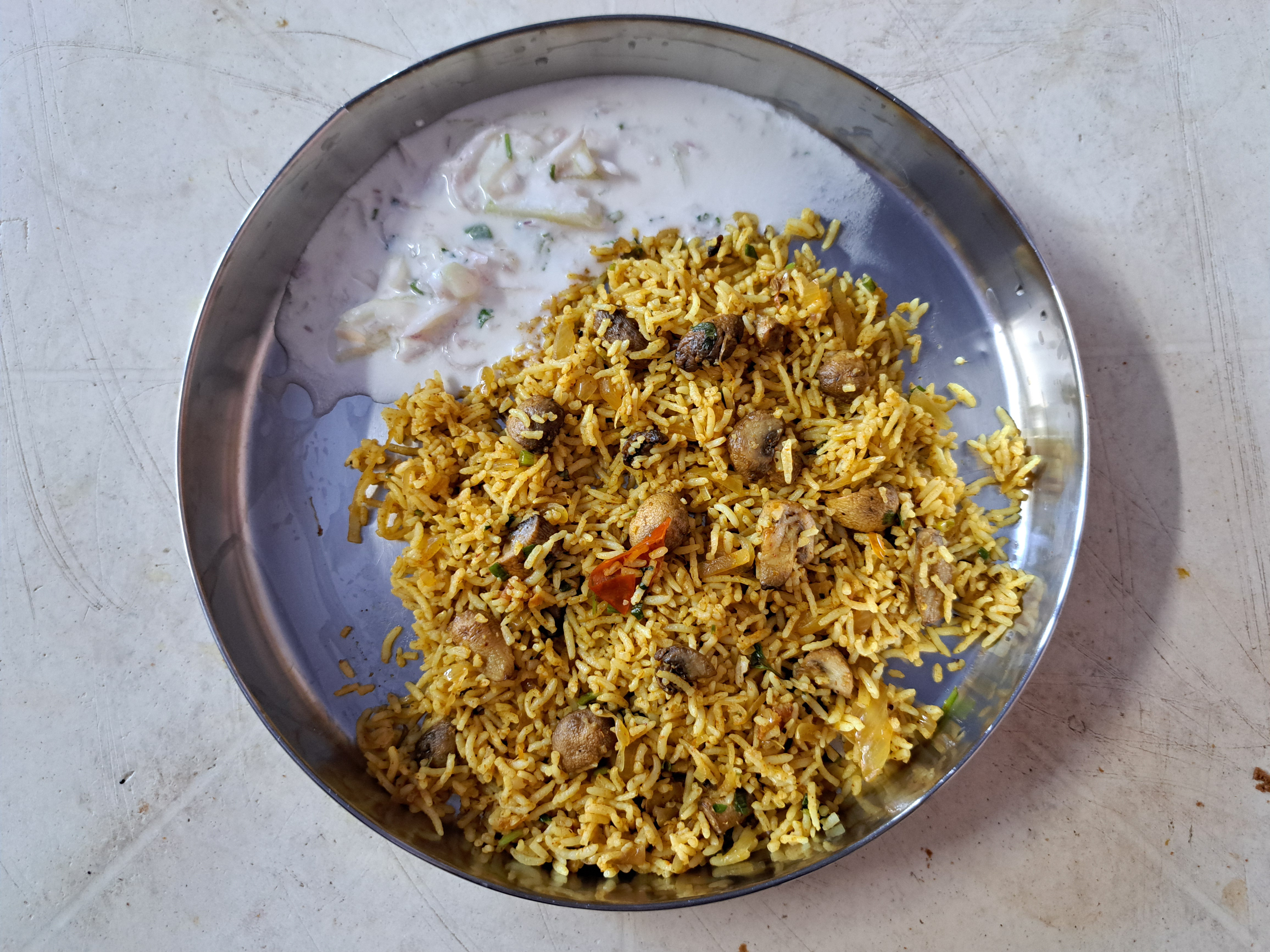
Mushroom biryani

== See also ==
- List of Chinese mushrooms and fungi
- List of onion dishes
- List of vegetable dishes
