= Mushroom gravy =

Type of sauce

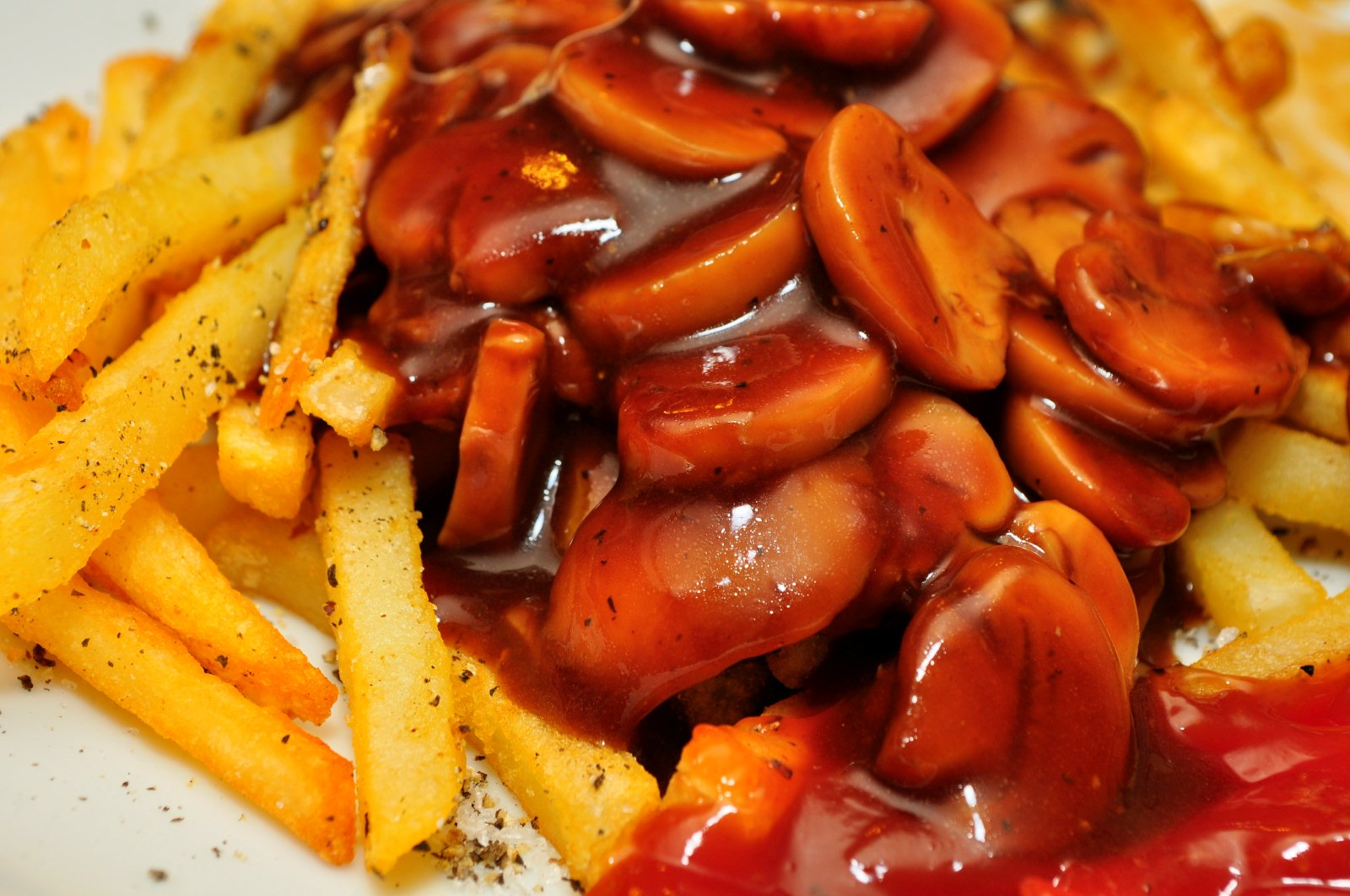
Mushroom gravy atop French fries

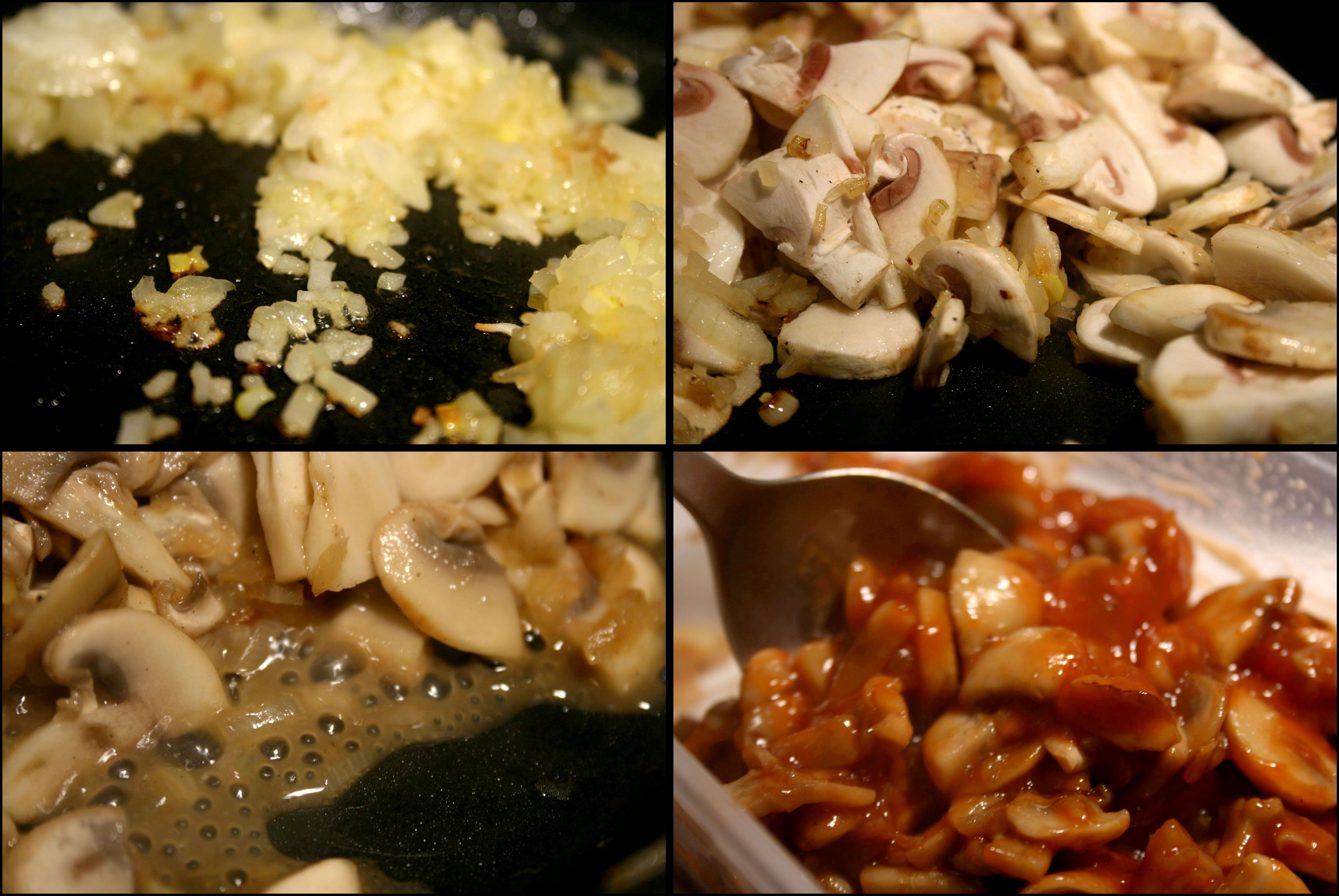
Preparation of a mushroom gravy

Mushroom gravy is a simple sauce that can be composed from stock (beef is typical, but chicken may be used), roux (a mixture of equal parts butter and flour to thicken), and mushroom base. It developed from mushroom gluts used in England to enhance gravies. An early version is in Elizabeth Raffald's The Experienced English Housekeeper from 1769. This type of sauce has been a staple of American cuisine for over 200 years. It continues to be a staple of vegan cuisine into the 21st century.

Recipes often include finely chopped or minced onion and garlic, or an onion soup powder.

It can also be enhanced with nutmeg, or mace to add a delicate nutmeg flavor.

Some recipes call for coriander, turmeric, garam masala, and/or red chili flakes.

== See also ==
- List of gravies
- List of mushroom dishes
- Mushroom sauce
