= Mushroom sauce =

White or brown sauce prepared with mushrooms

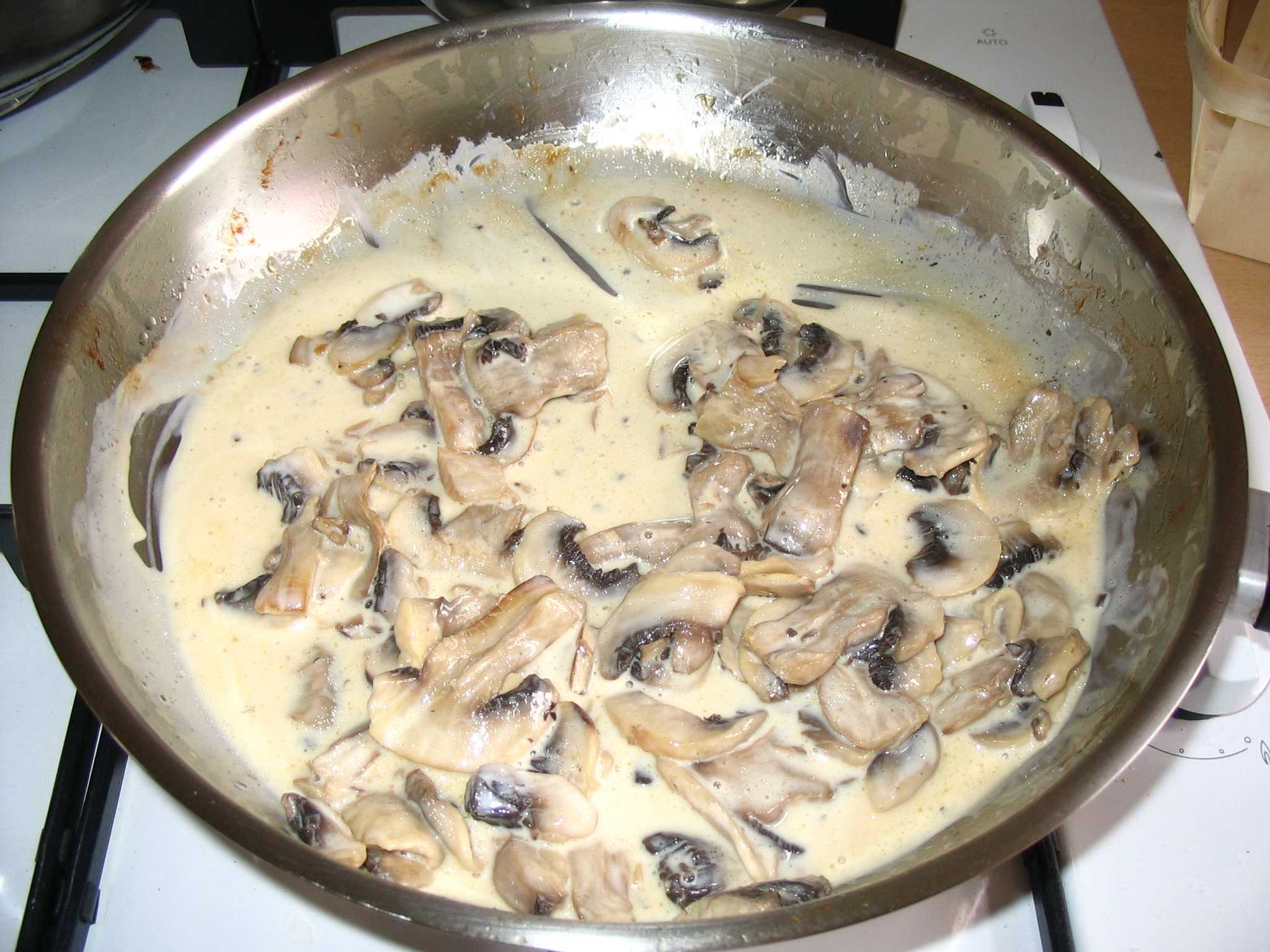
A cream-based mushroom sauce

Mushroom sauce is a white or brown sauce prepared using mushrooms as its primary ingredient. It can be prepared in different styles using various ingredients, and is used to top a variety of foods.

== Overview ==
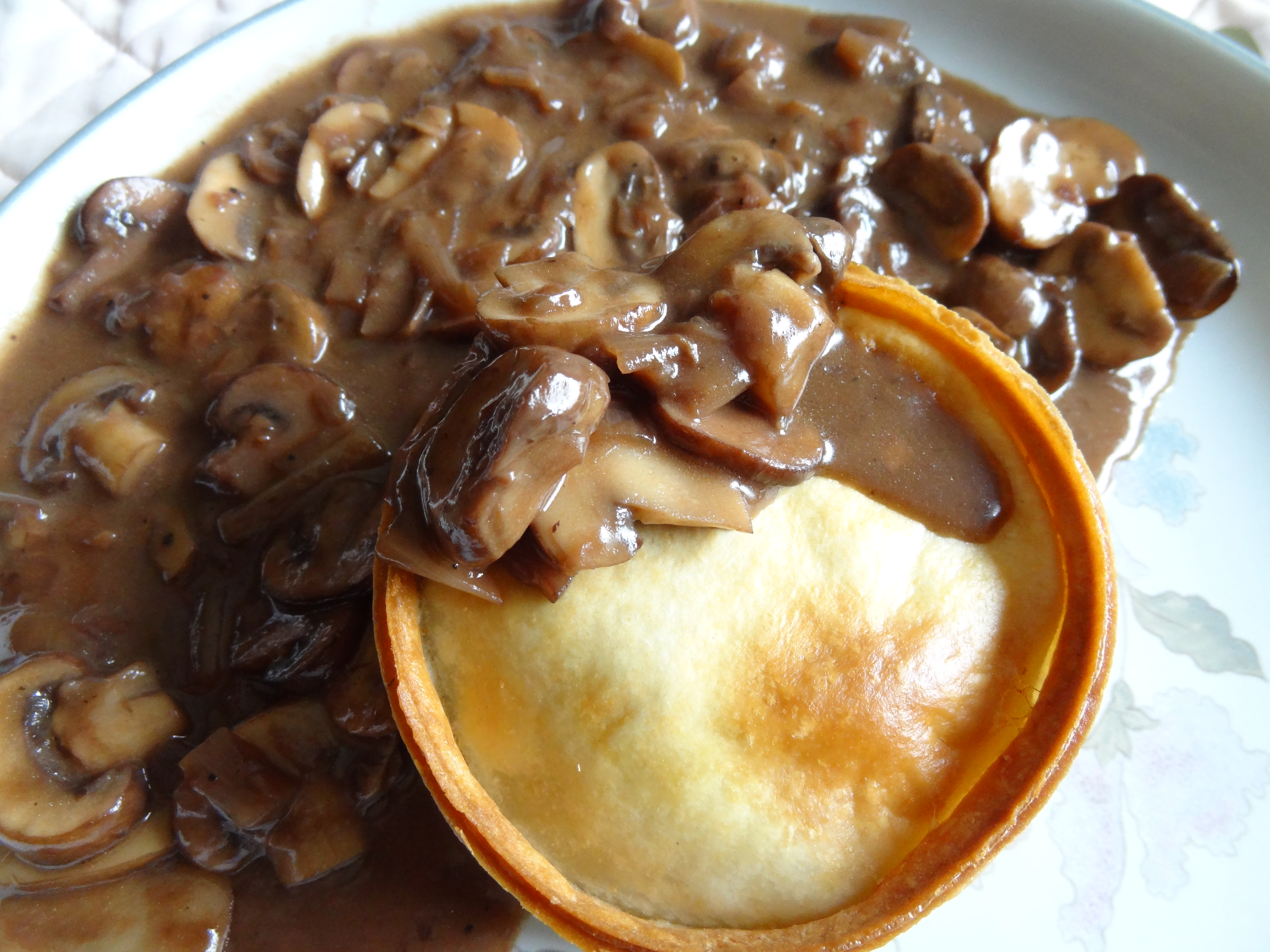
A brown mushroom sauce accompanying Scottish mince pie

In cooking, mushroom sauce is sauce with mushrooms as the primary ingredient. Often cream-based, it can be served with veal, chicken and poultry, pasta, and other foods such as vegetables. Some sources also suggest pairing mushroom sauce with fish.

It is made with mushrooms, butter, cream or olive oil, white wine (some variations may use a mellow red wine) and pepper with a wide variety of variations possible with additional ingredients such as shallot, garlic, lemon juice, flour (to thicken the sauce), chicken stock, saffron, basil, parsley, or other herbs. It is a variety of allemande sauce.

Mushroom sauce can also be prepared as a brown sauce. Canned mushrooms can be used to prepare the sauce.

== History ==
Mushroom sauces have been cooked for hundreds of years. An 1864 cookbook includes two recipes, one sauce tournee and one a brown gravy.

United States President Dwight D. Eisenhower, a well-known steak lover, was reportedly quite fond of mushroom sauce.

== Gallery ==
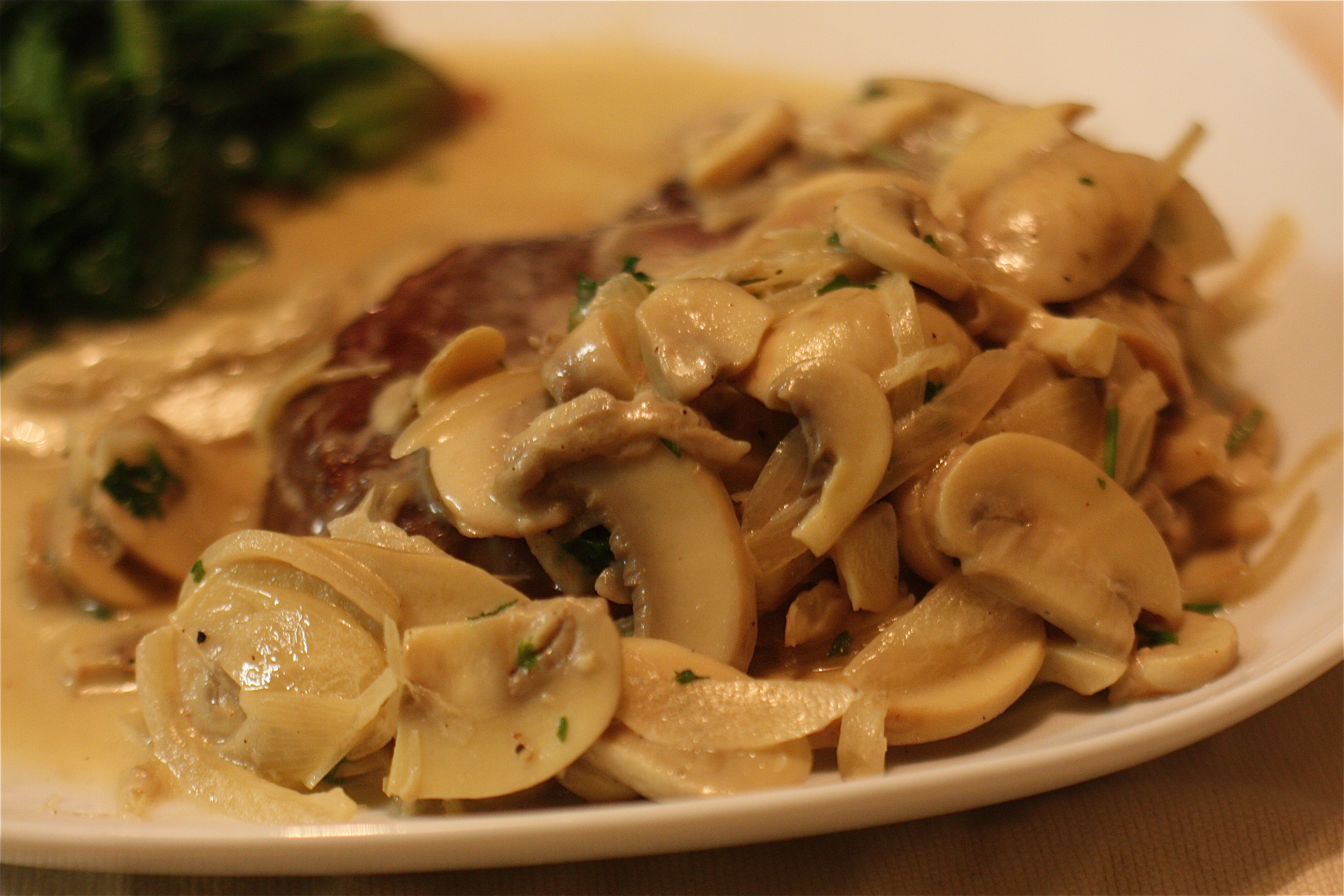
Filet mignon with mushroom-cream sauce

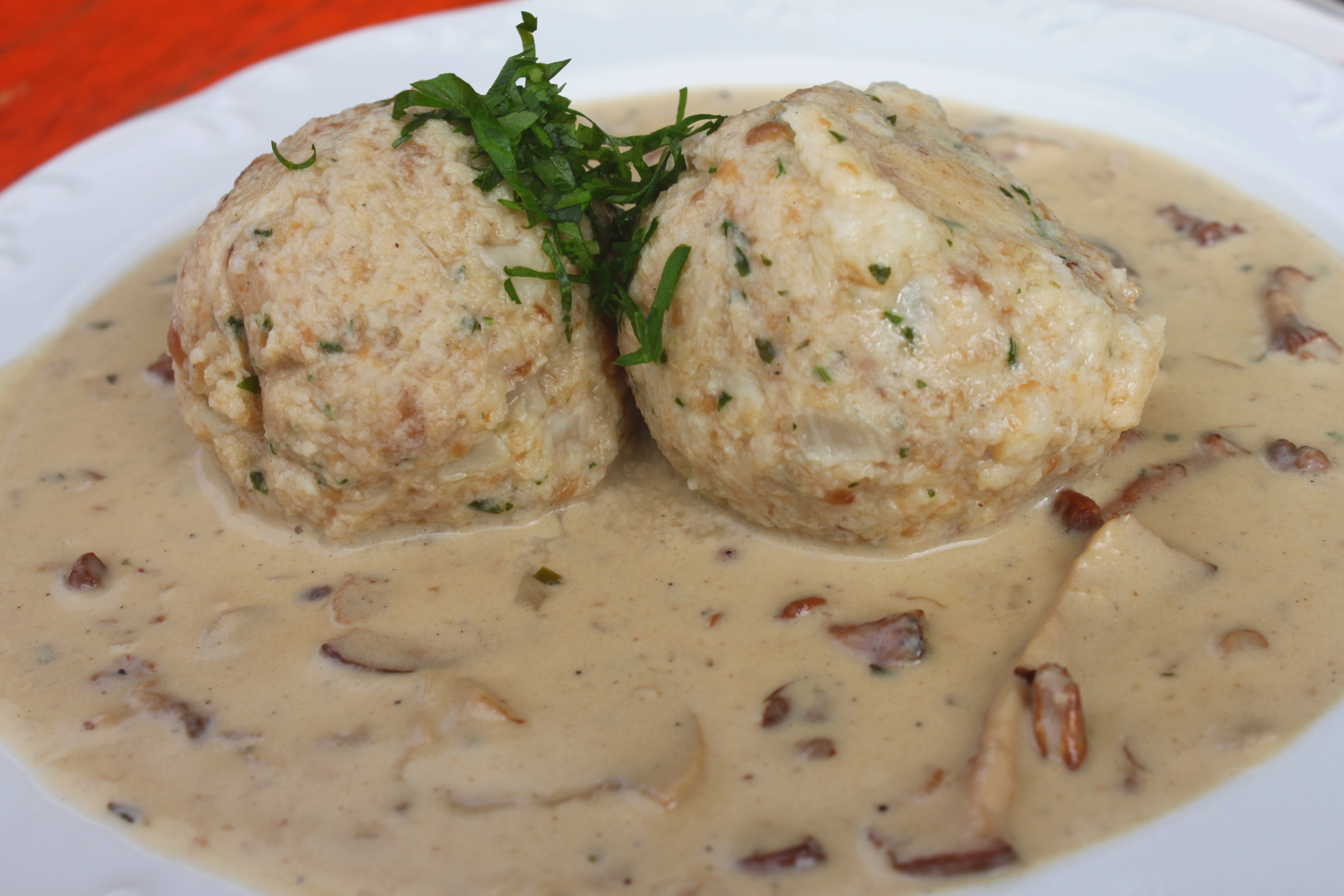
Semmelknödel with mushroom sauce

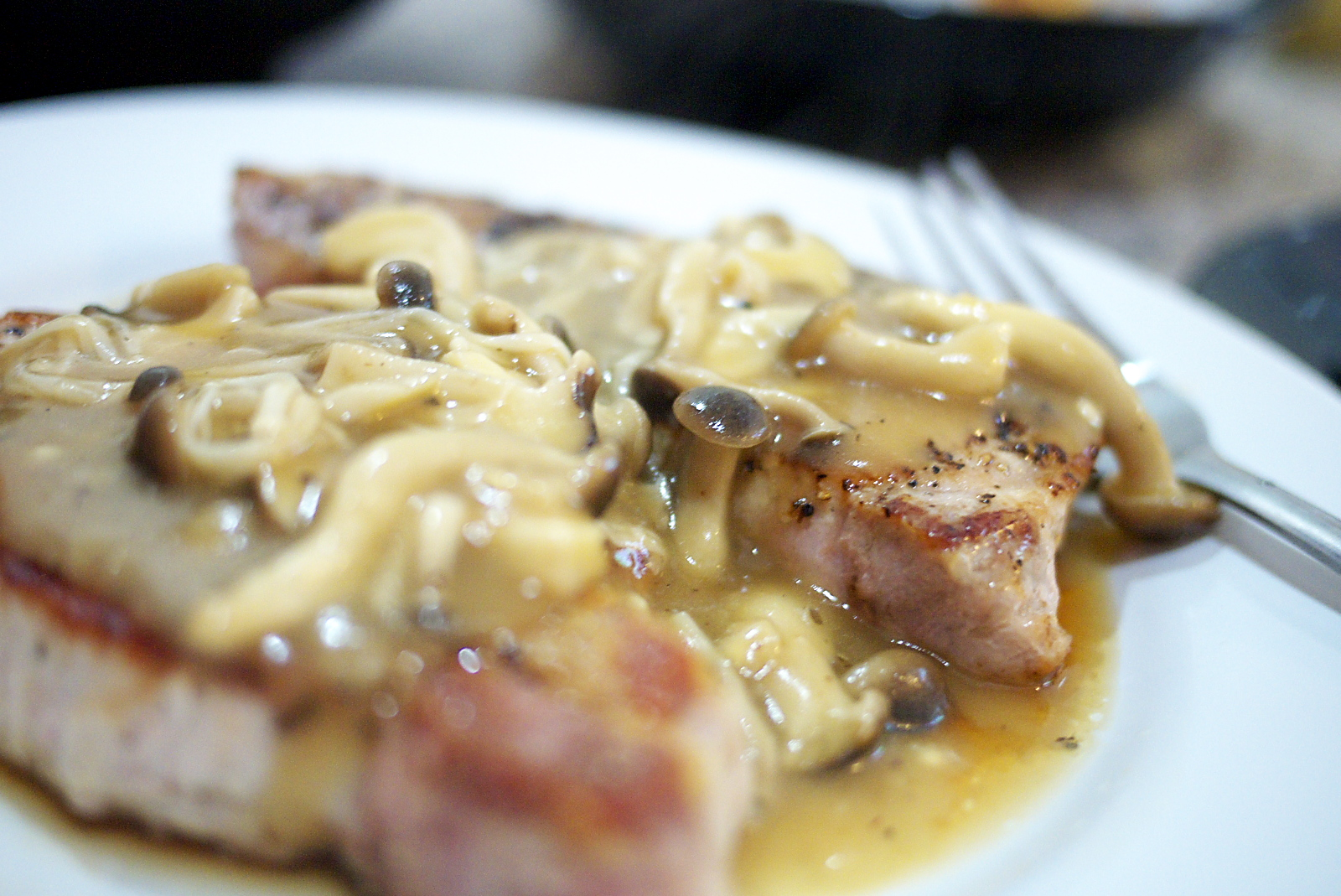
Grilled pork with mushroom sauce

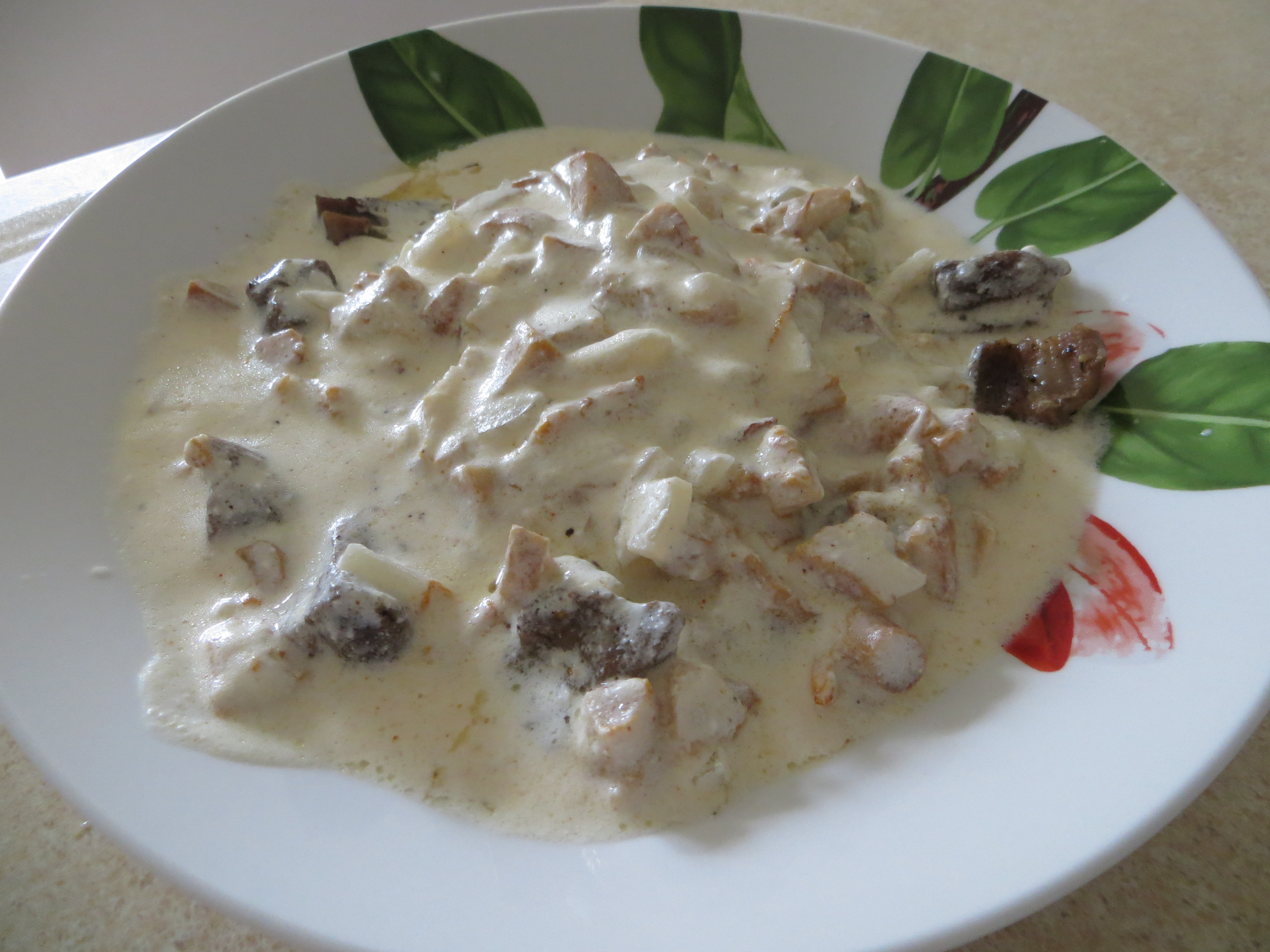
Chanterelle sauce served with steamed pork

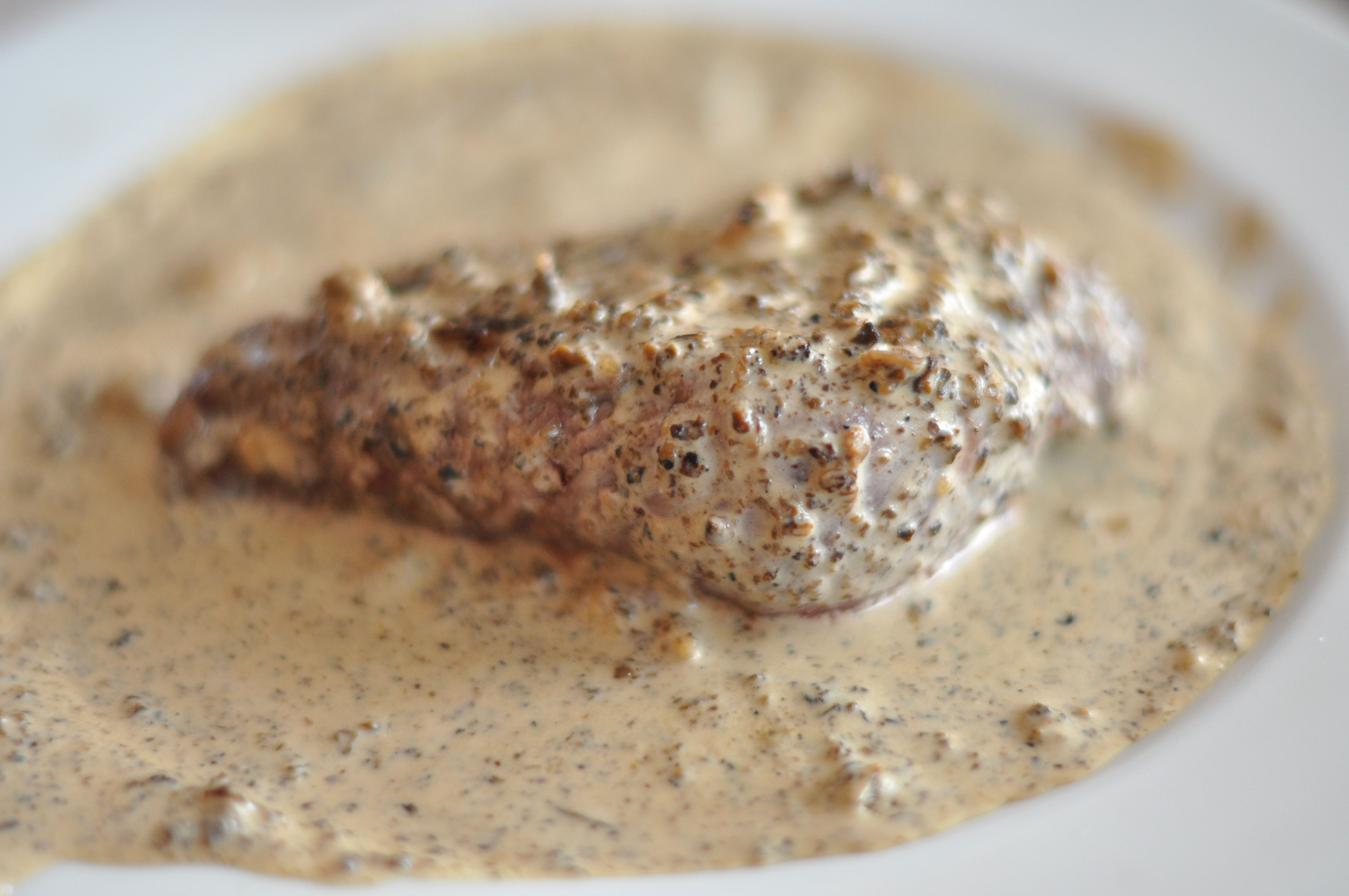
Rump steak in a morel mushroom sauce

== See also ==
- List of mushroom dishes
- List of sauces
- Mushroom gravy
- Mushroom ketchup
