= Ciulama =

Dish that can be mainly found in Romanian and Moldovan cuisine

- Alternative names: Topală
- Place of origin: Romania; Moldova
- Main ingredients: Poultry; Mushrooms; Flour; Butter; Onions; Parsley root Carrots

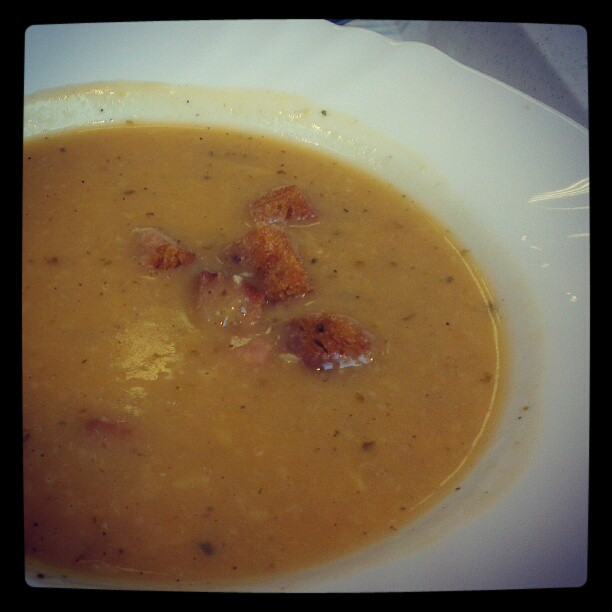

Ciulama is a dish that can be mainly found in Romanian and Moldovan cuisine. The name of this dish is hypothesized to come from Turkish (çullama), however it is entirely unrelated in form and bears no resemblance to the latter. It is prepared from meat (especially poultry) or mushrooms in white sauce. The sauce is made from a flour roux (known locally as "rântaș") with milk, cream, soup or a combination thereof. Typical seasonings include but are not limited to white pepper and nutmeg.

== See also ==
- List of mushroom dishes
