= Duxelles =

Chopped mushroom mixture

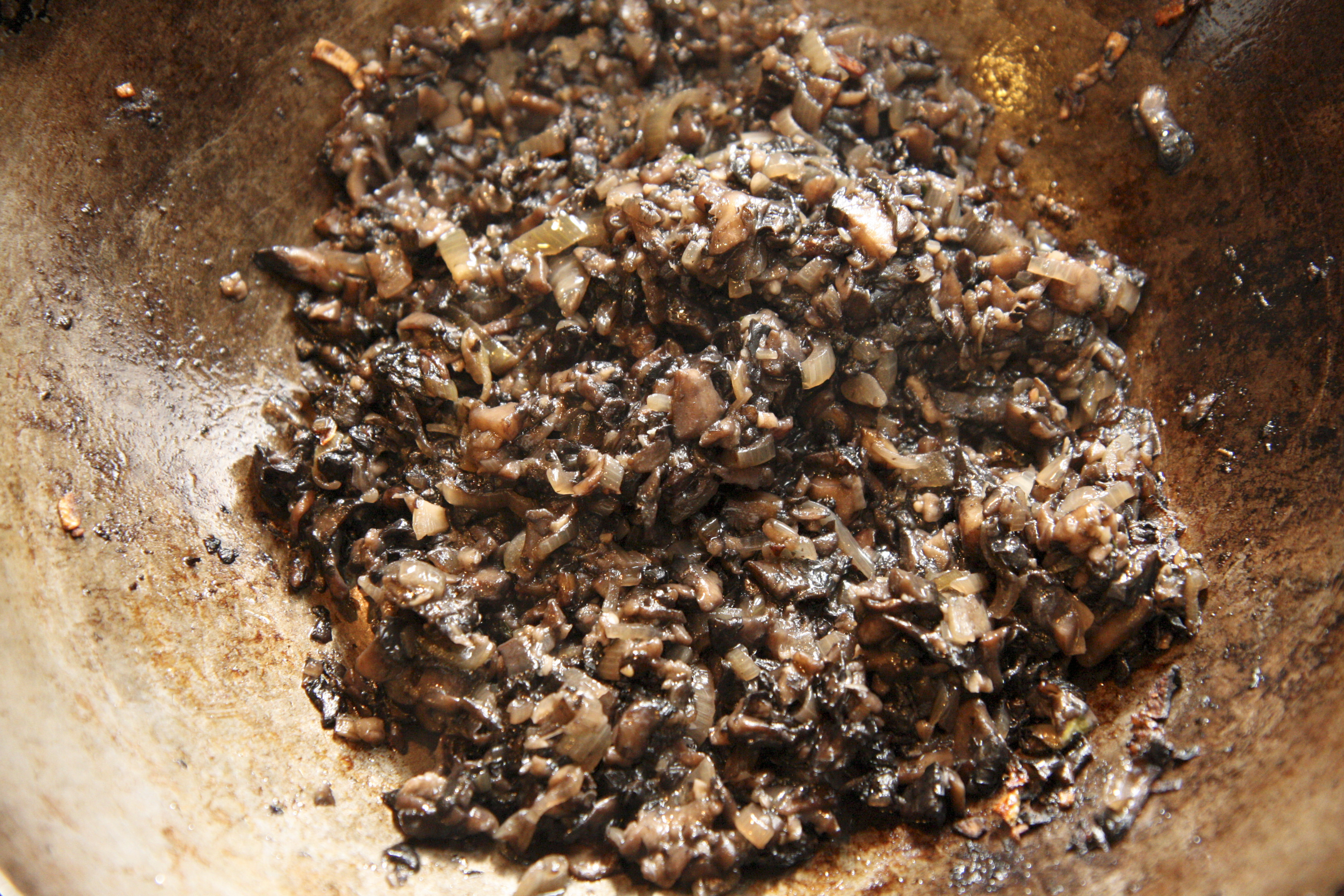
- Preparation of duxelles
- Created by: François Pierre La Varenne
- Invented: 17th century
- Main ingredients: Mushrooms
- Ingredients generally used: Onions or shallots; herbs

Duxelles (French: [dyksɛl]) is a French cuisine term that refers to a mince of mushrooms, onions, herbs (such as thyme or parsley), and black pepper, sautéed in butter and reduced to a paste. Cream is sometimes used, and some recipes add a dash of madeira or sherry.

It is a basic preparation used in stuffings and sauces (notably, beef Wellington) or as a garnish. It can also be filled into a pocket of raw pastry and baked as a savoury tart.

The flavor depends on the mushrooms used. For example, wild porcini mushrooms have a much stronger flavor than white or brown mushrooms.

Duxelles is said to have been created by the 17th-century French chef François Pierre La Varenne (1615–1678) and to have been named after his employer, Nicolas Chalon du Blé, marquis d'Uxelles, maréchal de France.

Some classical cookbooks call for dehydrated mushrooms. According to Auguste Escoffier, dehydration enhances flavor and prevents water vapor from building up pressure that could cause a pastry to crack or even explode.

== See also ==
- Sautéed mushrooms
- List of mushroom dishes
