= Selsko meso =

Balkan stew of pork and mushrooms

Selsko Meso
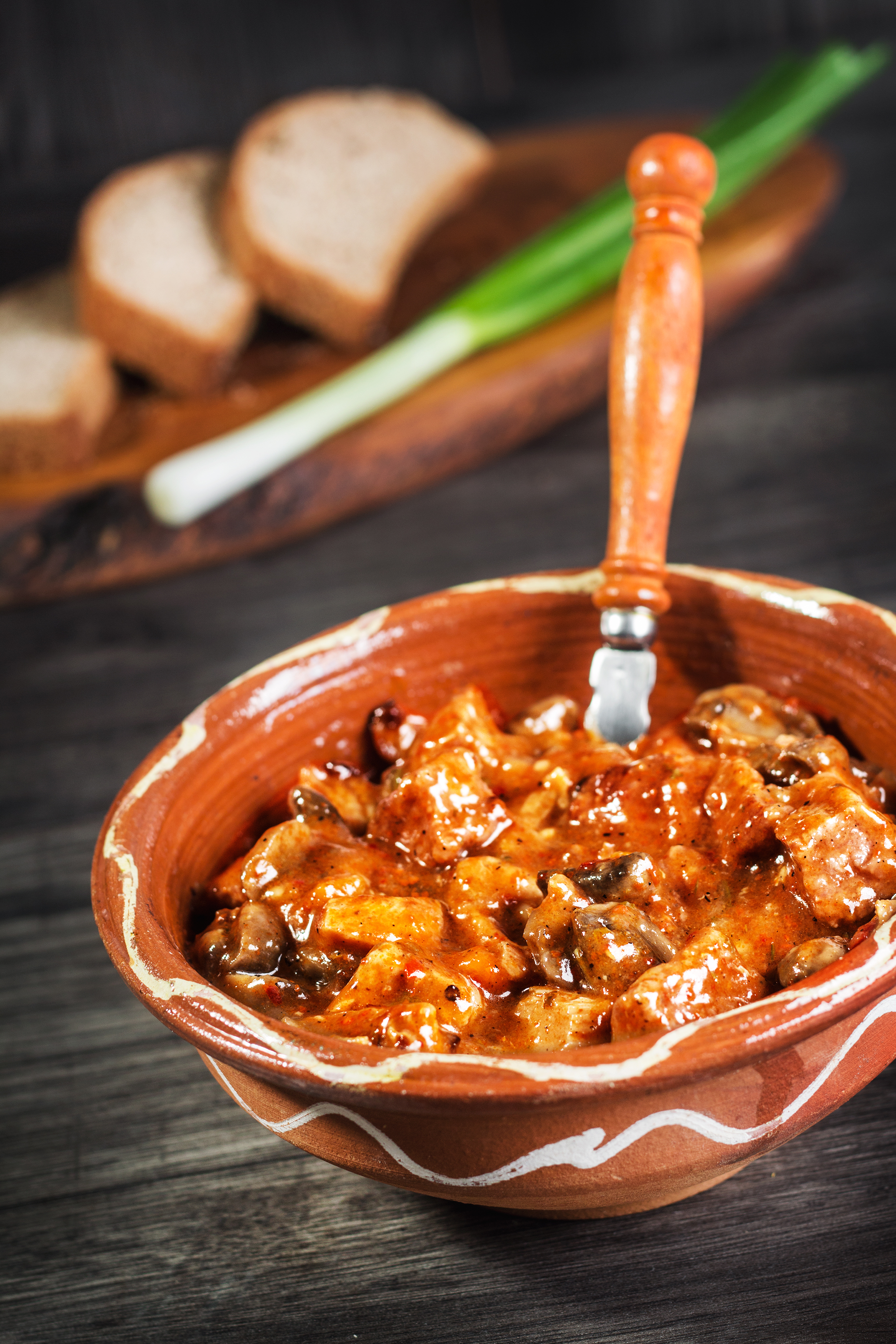
- Selsko meso served with bread.
- Course: Main
- Place of origin: North Macedonia
- Associated cuisine: Macedonian
- Serving temperature: Hot
- Main ingredients: Meat

Selsko meso (Macedonian: селско месо, "village meat") is a Macedonian pork and mushroom stew, also found in the cuisine of Bulgaria. Typical ingredients include pork, onions, smoked meat, ground beef, tomatoes, cream cheese, mushrooms, peppers, spices, wine, and salt. It is traditionally prepared in a clay pot.

== Ingredients ==
- Pork
- Onion pieces
- Smoked meat
- Ground beef
- Tomatoes/Ketchup
- Cream cheese
- Mushrooms
- Peppers, spices and salt
- Wine

== See also ==
- Macedonian cuisine
- List of mushroom dishes
