= Fried mushrooms =

Hors d'oeuvre made from mushrooms

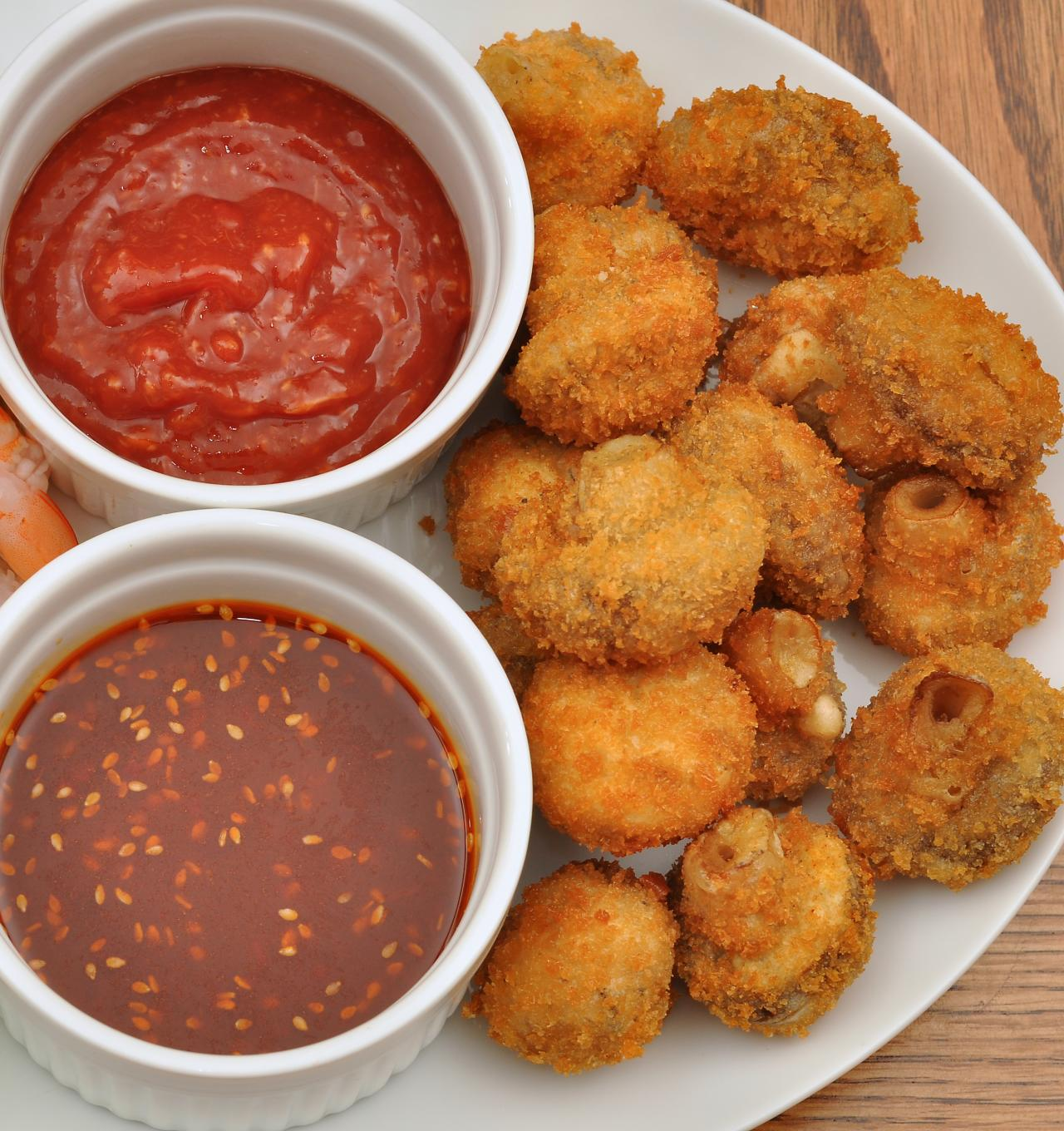
- Fried, battered mushrooms with dipping sauces
- Course: Hors d'oeuvre
- Main ingredients: mushrooms, batter

Fried mushrooms or battered mushrooms are a dish made by the frying or deep frying of edible mushrooms, sometimes after dipping them in batter. Often mixed with garlic powder to become garlic mushroom.

In Canada, the United States, United Kingdom and other countries, they are often served as an appetizer or snack, often with ranch dressing, garlic mayonnaise or barbecue sauce, and sometimes with spices added to the batter for flavor. These spices are similar to those used in preparing stuffed mushrooms. In the United Kingdom, battered mushrooms are sometimes sold by fish and chip shops.

== See also ==
- List of hors d'oeuvre
- Full English breakfast
