= Stuffed mushrooms =

Culinary dish or snack

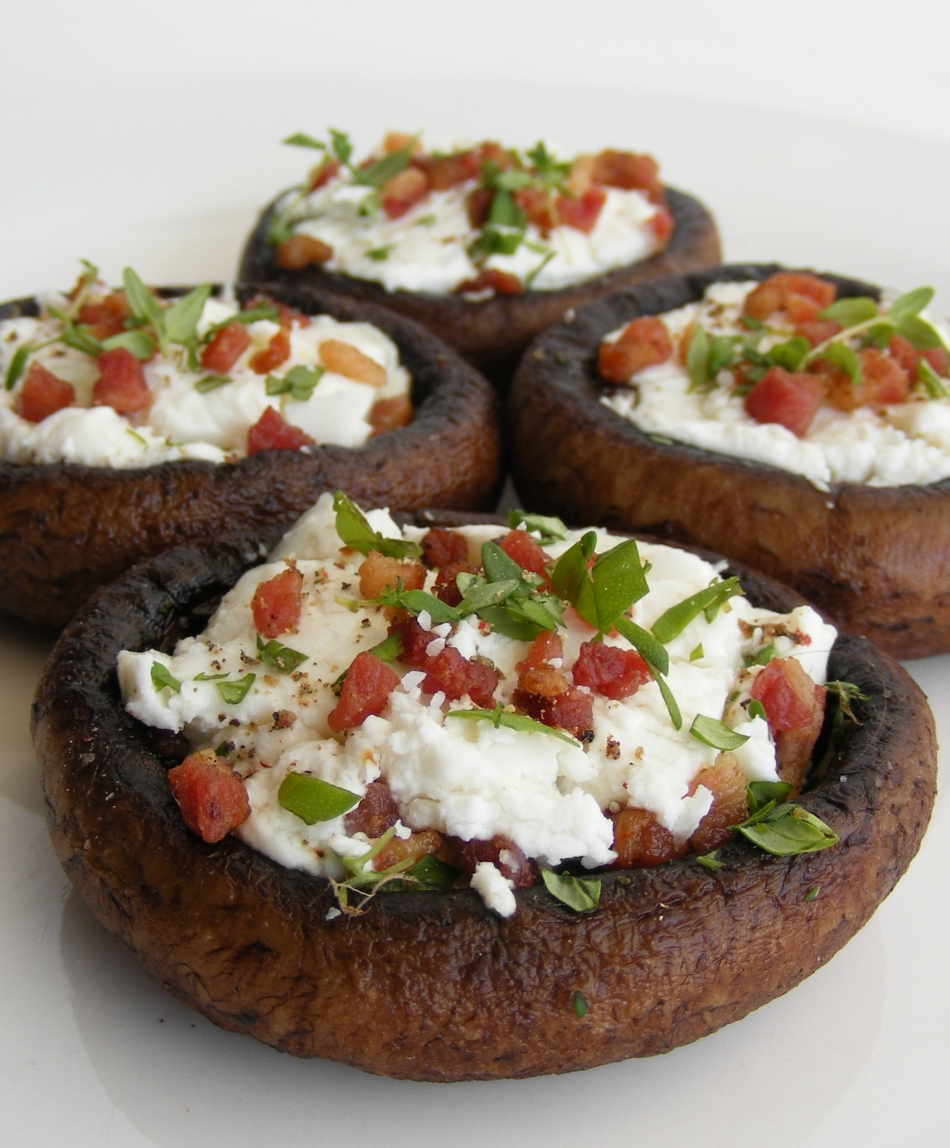
- Stuffed portabello mushrooms
- Course: Side dish or snack
- Serving temperature: Usually hot or room-temperature
- Main ingredients: Edible mushrooms

Stuffed mushrooms is a dish prepared using edible mushrooms as its primary ingredient. Many fillings can be used, and the dish is typically baked or broiled. It can be served hot or at room temperature, and is sometimes served cold. The dish can have a meaty texture, and serves as an hors d'oeuvre, side dish, or snack.

== Overview ==
Edible mushrooms are the main ingredient in stuffed mushrooms. Preparation typically involves washing the mushrooms and removing the stems, after which the caps are turned over and stuffed with various fillings. The removed stems can be chopped and used as in ingredient in the filling. Filling ingredients used are diverse, and can include bread crumbs, spinach, tomato, cheese, onion, garlic, herbs such as basil, chives, tarragon and parsley, meats such as sausage and pork, egg, spices, salt and pepper. The filling can be sautéed prior to being placed in the mushroom caps. The dish can be drizzled with olive oil prior to cooking. The dish can have a meat-like texture.

Stuffed mushrooms are typically placed on a cooking pan or dish and baked or broiled to cook the dish. They can also be cooked on skewers, and can be cooked on a rotisserie. The mushrooms shrink during the baking process. The dish is typically served hot or at room temperature, and can also be served cold. The dish can be served as an hors d'oeuvre, as a side dish, and as a snack.

Stuffed mushrooms

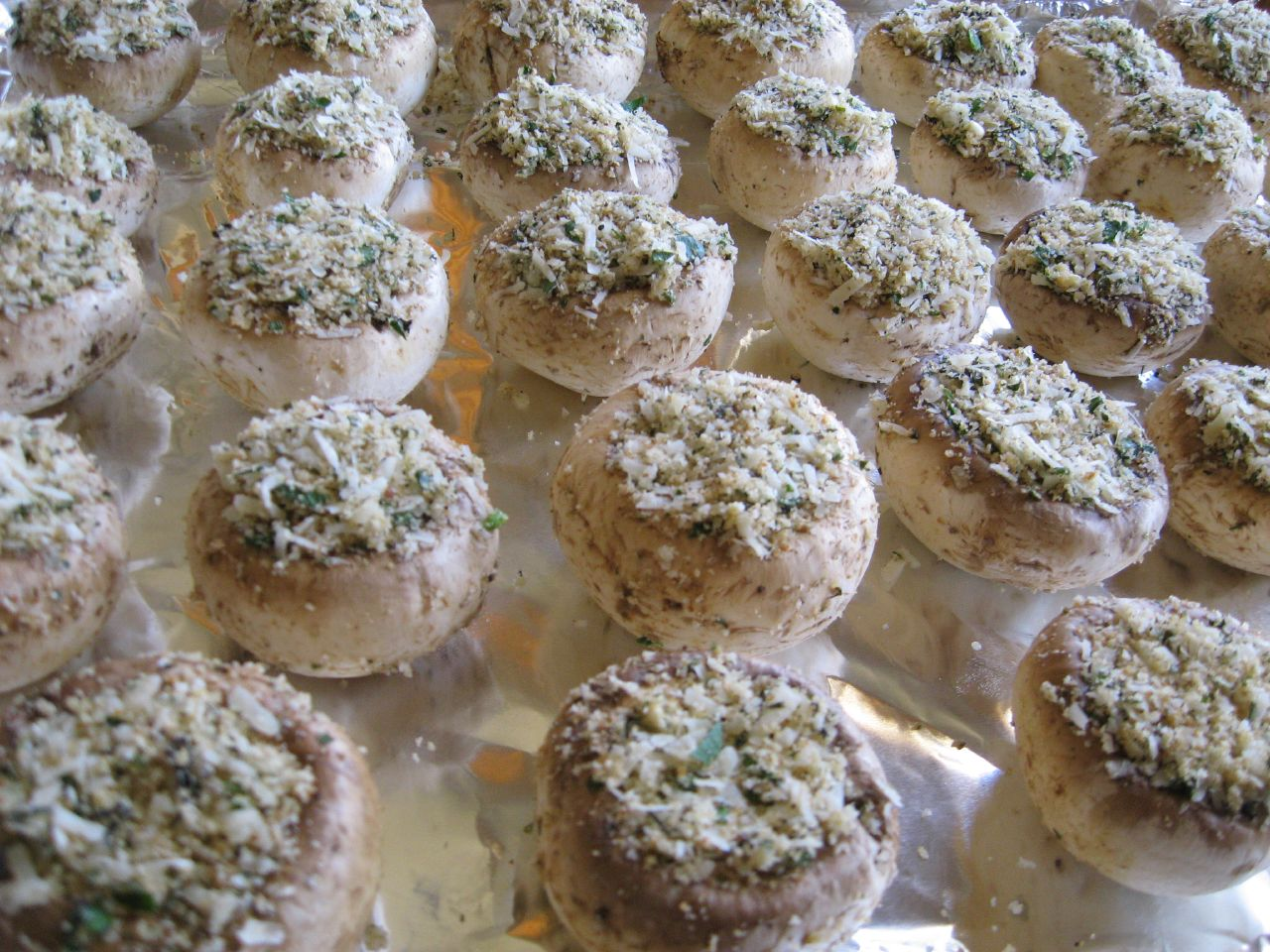
Uncooked stuffed mushrooms

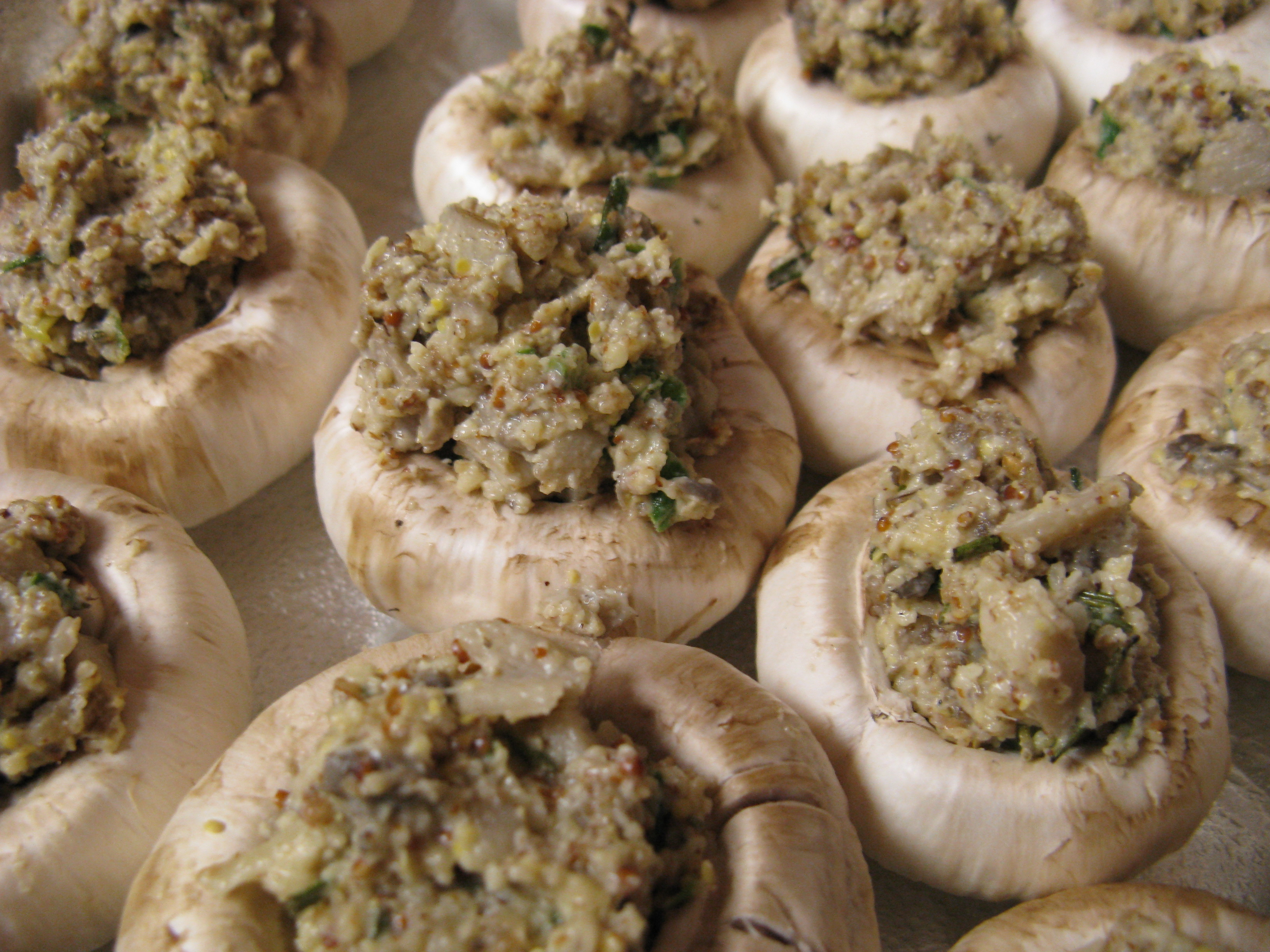
Close-up view of the filling in uncooked stuffed mushrooms

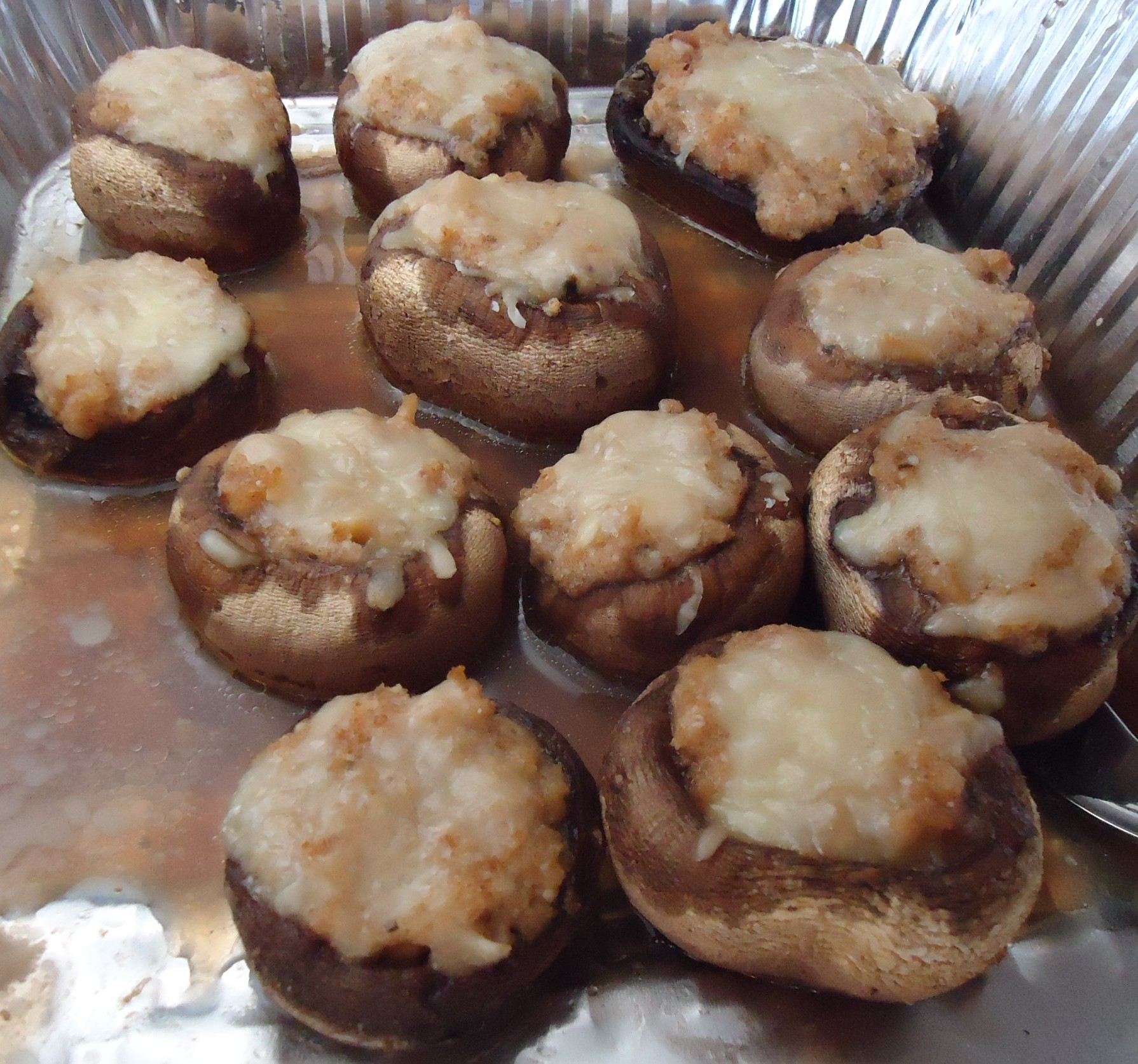
Close-up view of cooked stuffed mushrooms

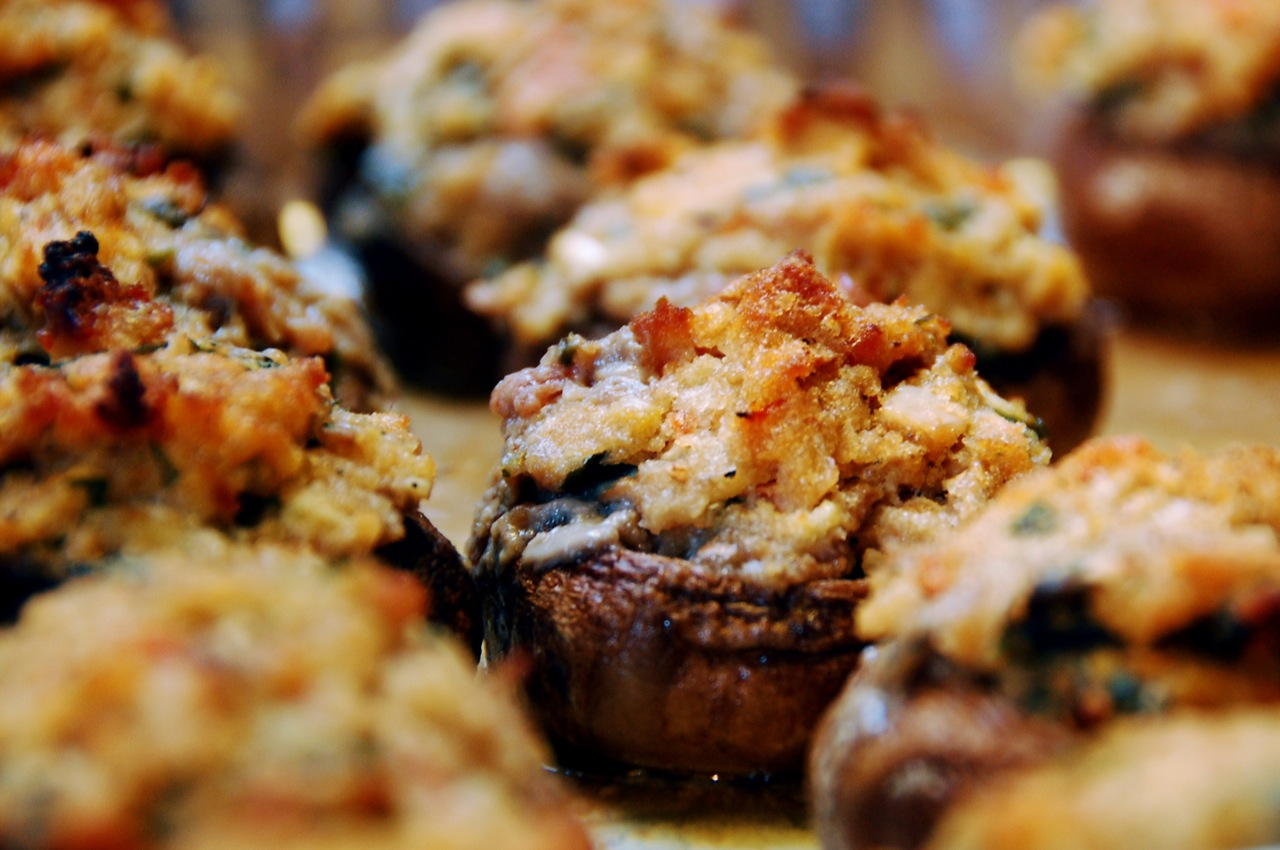
Close-up view of cooked stuffed mushrooms

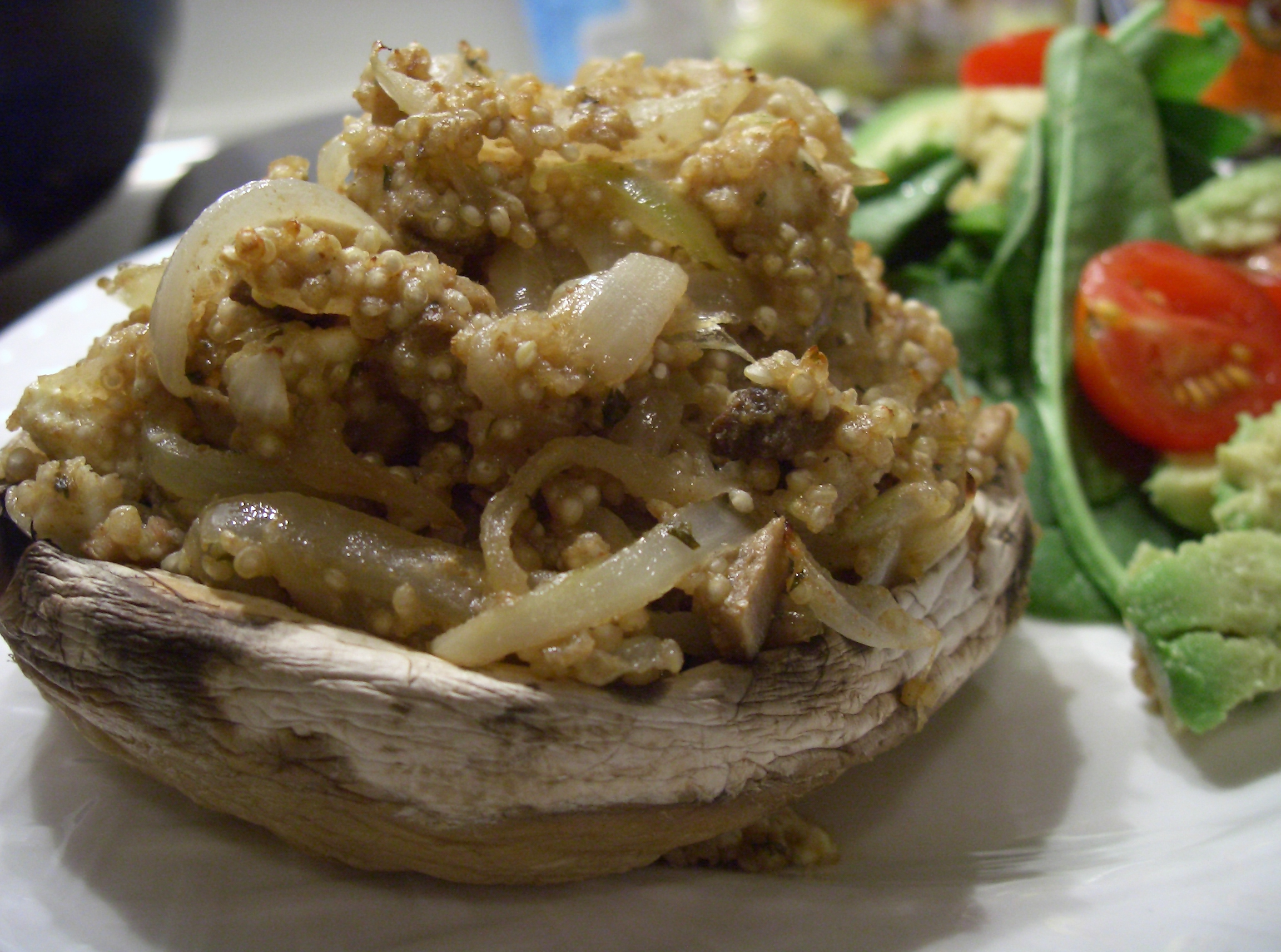
A stuffed mushroom with spiced quinoa

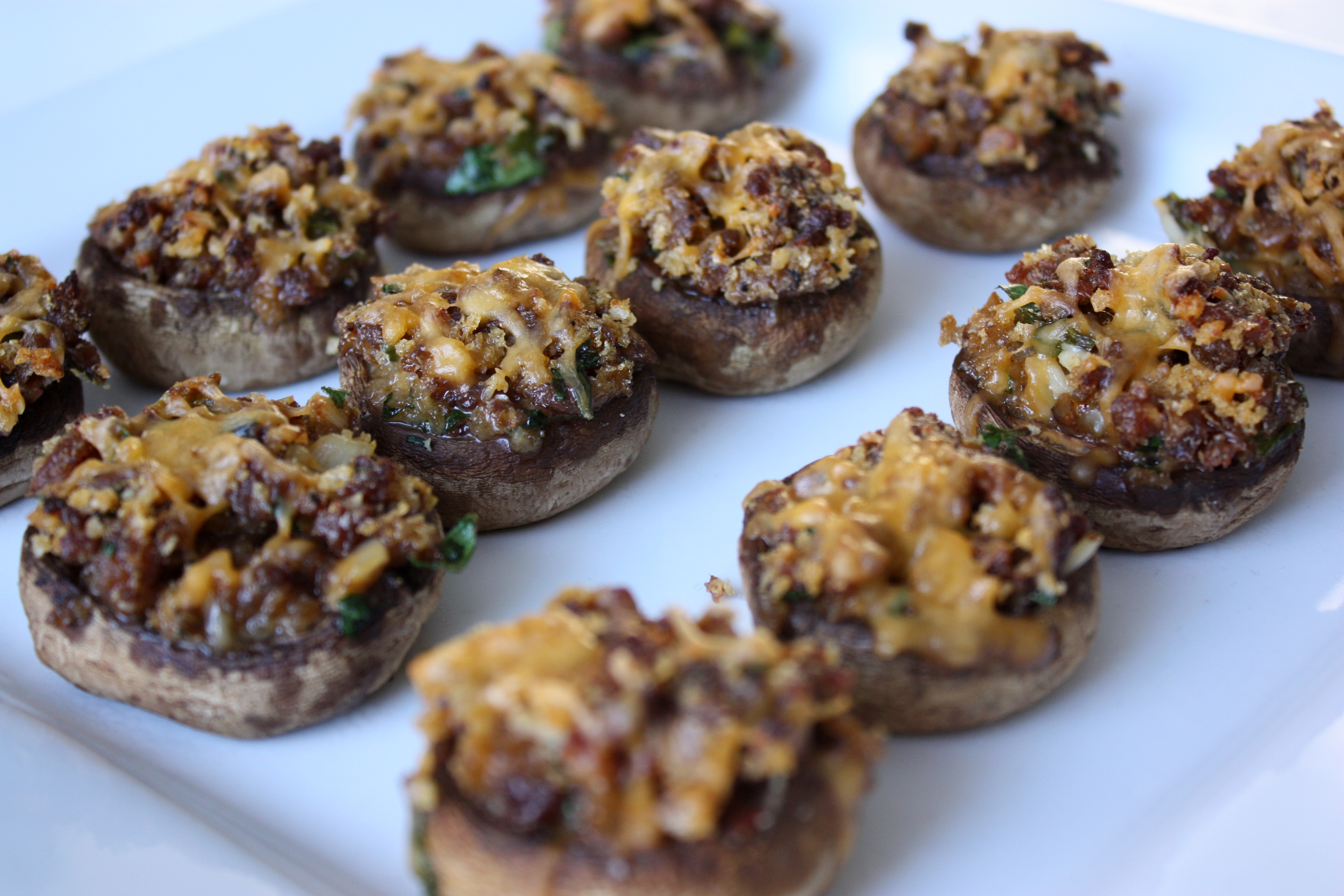
Sausage-stuffed mushrooms

== See also ==
- List of hors d'oeuvre
- List of mushroom dishes
