= Pincho =

Small snack in northern Spain

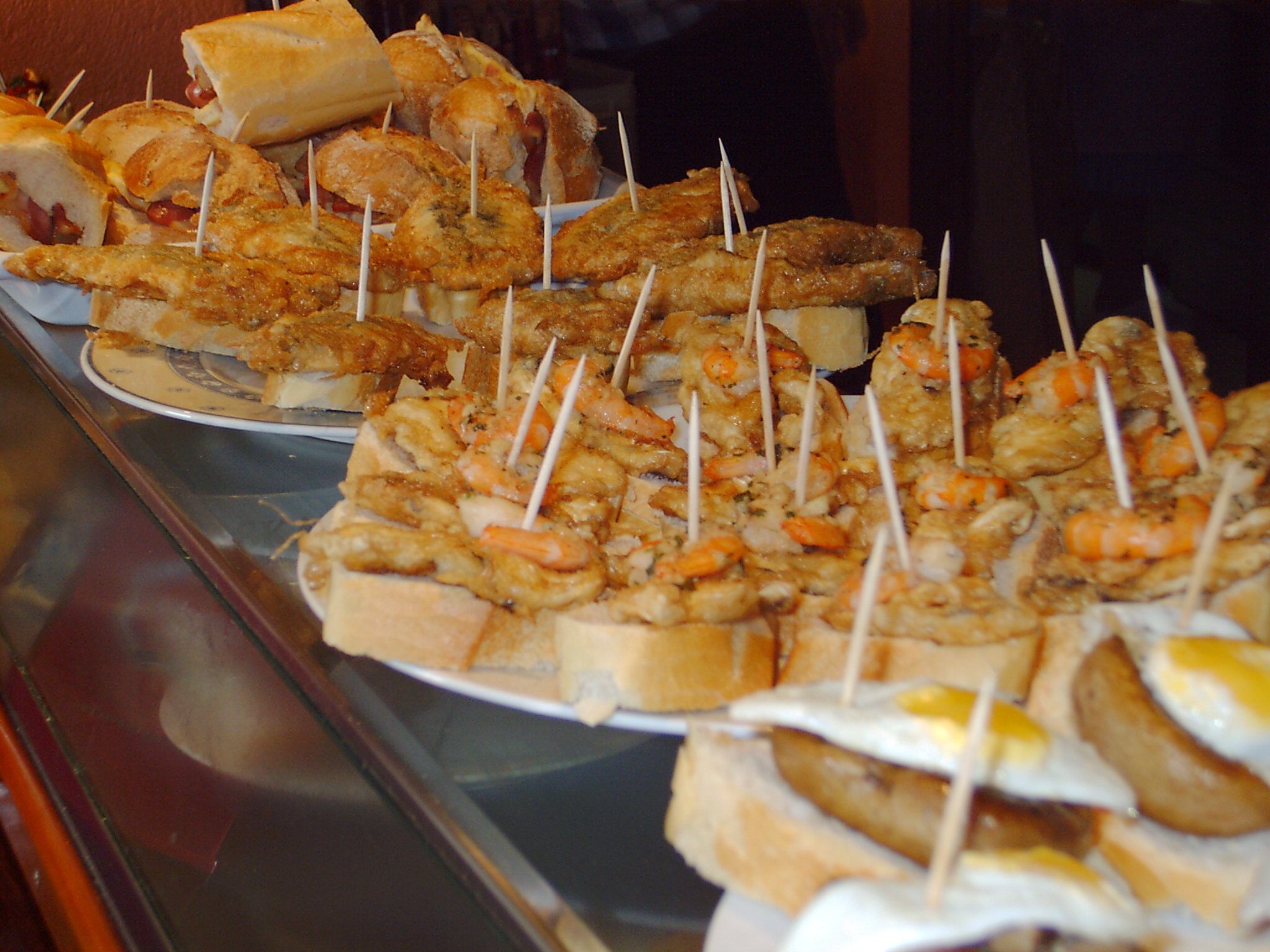
- Pintxos served in Bermeo
- Alternative names: Pintxo
- Course: Hors d'oeuvre or snack
- Place of origin: Spain
- Main ingredients: Sliced bread, topping

A pincho (Spanish: [ˈpintʃo]; literally "thorn" or "spike"), pintxo (Basque: [pintʃo]) or pinchu (Asturian: [ˈpintʃʊ]) is a small snack, typically eaten in bars or taverns. They are traditional in northern Spain and especially popular in the Basque country, Navarre, La Rioja, Cantabria, and Asturias. Pinchos are usually eaten in the company of friends or relatives; thus, they have a strong socializing component, and, in the Basque country and Navarre, they are usually regarded as a cornerstone of local culture and society. They are related to tapas, the main difference being that pinchos are usually 'spiked' with a skewer or toothpick, often to a piece of bread. They are served in individual portions and always ordered and paid for independently from the drinks. It is not impossible, however, for the same item to be called pincho in one place and tapa in another.

They are called pinchos because many of them have a pincho (Spanish for spike), typically a toothpick —or a skewer for the larger varieties— through them. They should not be confused with brochettes (brochetas in Spanish) which, in Latin America and some parts of Spain, are called pinchos too (see pinchitos); in brochettes, the skewer or toothpick is needed to cook the food or keep it together.

== Basque pintxo ==
A typical snack of the Basque Country and Navarre, "pinchos" consist of small slices of bread upon which an ingredient or mixture of ingredients is placed and fastened with a toothpick, which gives the food its name "pincho," meaning "spike." Pinchos are usually eaten as an appetizer, accompanied by a small glass of young white wine (called txakoli, pronounced [tʃakoˈli]) or beer (zurito, pronounced [s̻uˈɾito] quarter of a pint). Pinchos are common in the taverns of the Basque Country and in other nearby areas, such as Cantabria, La Rioja, northern Burgos, and Navarre, where a variety of pinchos is usually served on a tray at the bar.

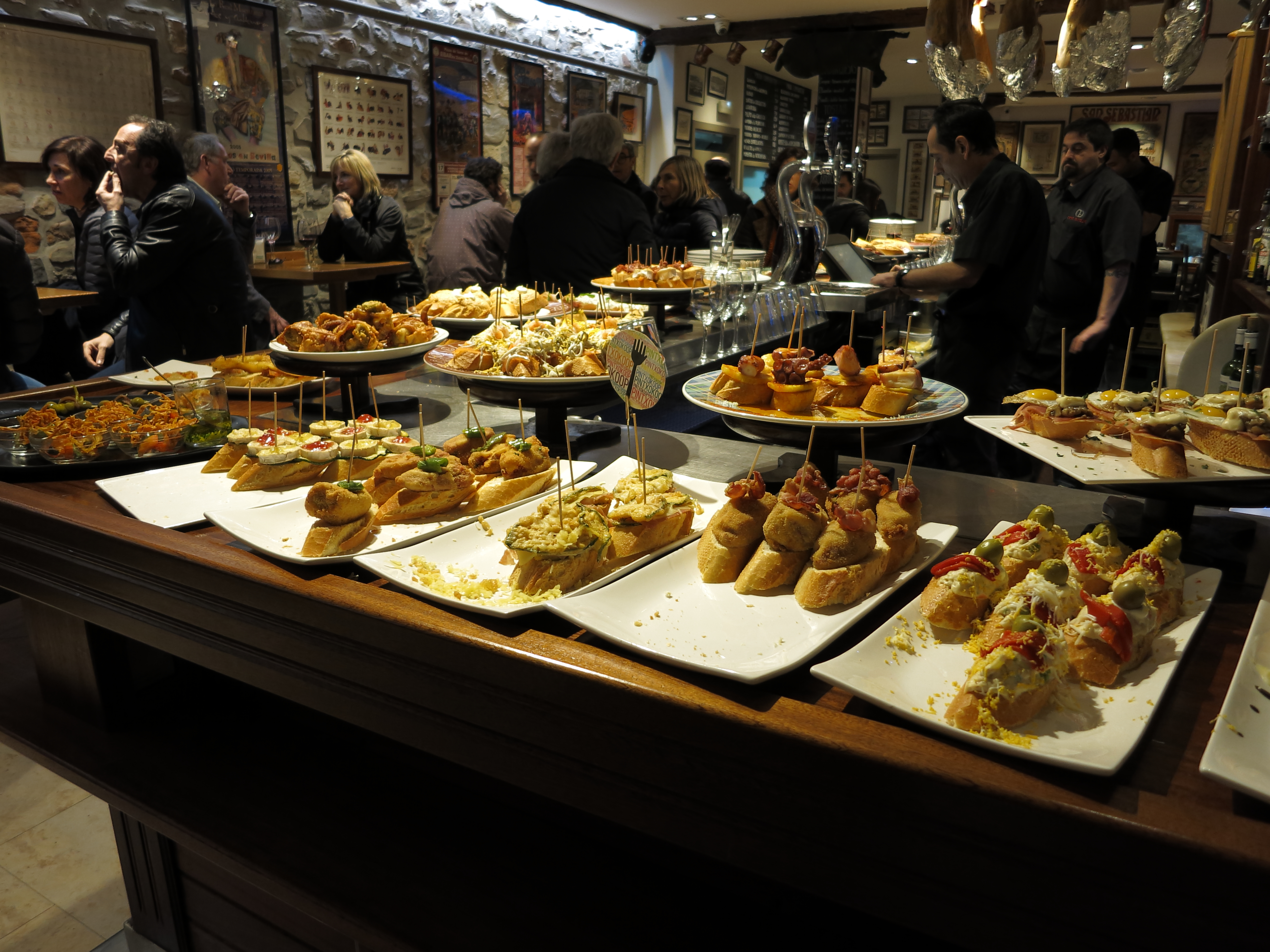
Pinchos in bar

In this type of pinchos, the toothpick is used to keep ingredients from falling off the bread and track the number of items the customer has eaten. Sometimes, differently priced pinchos have toothpicks of different shapes or sizes.

Almost any ingredient can be put on the bread, but those most commonly found in the Basque Country include fish such as hake, cod, anchovy; tortilla de patatas; stuffed peppers; and croquettes. Pinchos can be relatively sophisticated, sometimes consisting of elaborate (and occasionally expensive) fish, other seafood, or meat.

Pinchos are used as an excuse for socializing. Typically, a group of friends will go from one tavern to another, drinking small glasses of wine or beer and eating pinchos.

== See also ==
- Gilda
- Canapé
- Tapas
- Pinchitos
- Mixed grill
- Yakitori
- Brochette
- Cicchetti
