= Cucumber sandwich =

Sandwich made with cucumber

Cucumber sandwiches
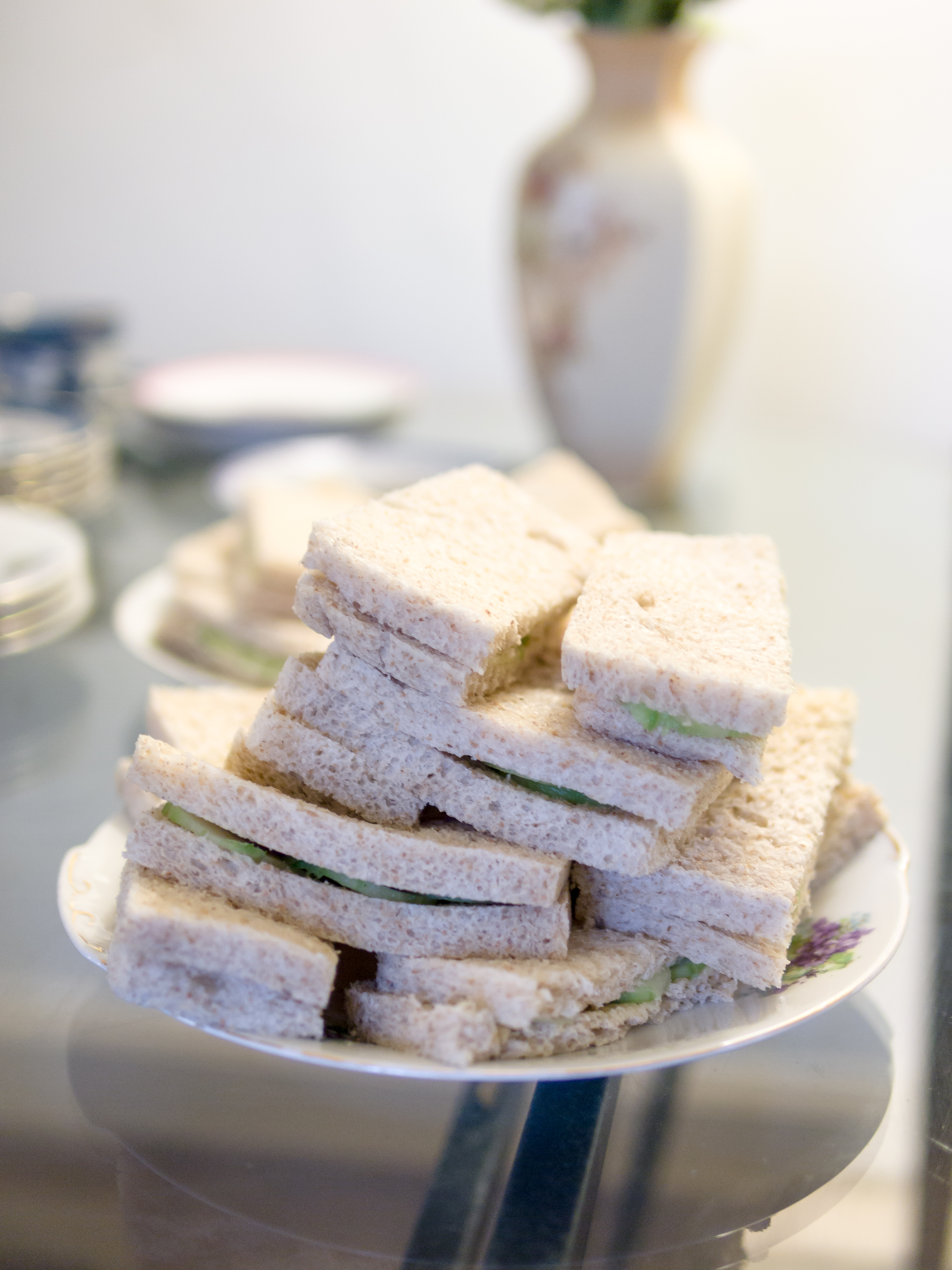
- Cucumber sandwiches stacked on a plate
- Type: Tea sandwich
- Course: Afternoon tea
- Place of origin: United Kingdom
- Main ingredients: White bread, cucumber, butter
- Variations: Brown bread

The traditional cucumber sandwich is a crustless tea sandwich (or finger sandwich) composed of thin slices of cucumber situated between two thin slices of lightly buttered white bread. The sandwich originated in the United Kingdom.

Cucumber sandwiches are most often served for a light snack or afternoon tea, or in the early evening before the main supper. Cucumber sandwiches are also traditionally served during the tea break at club cricket matches in England.

== Cultural and historical associations ==
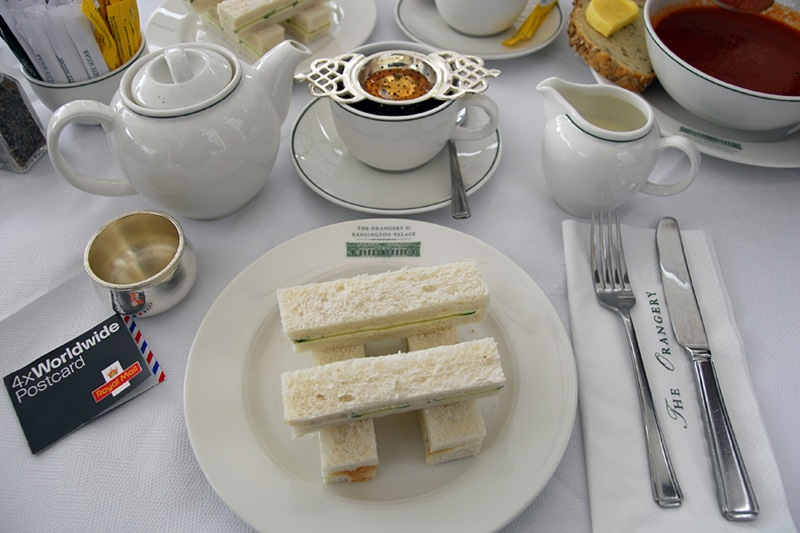
Cucumber sandwiches and tea, as served at Kensington Palace

Cucumber sandwiches form an integral part of the stereotypical afternoon tea affair. By contrast, people of the era's lower working classes were thought to prefer a coarser but more satisfying protein-filled sandwich, in a "meat tea" that might substitute for supper.

Some writers have attempted to draw out an association between the daintiness of the sandwich and the perceived effeteness of the UK's aristocracy. As a result, cucumber sandwiches are often used in novels and films as a means to identify upper-class people, occasionally in a derogatory manner. In the first act of Oscar Wilde's The Importance of Being Earnest (1895), cucumber sandwiches that have expressly been ordered and prepared for Lady Bracknell's expected visit are all voraciously eaten beforehand by her nephew and host, Algernon Moncrieff; consequently, Moncrieff is forced to lie, with his butler's connivance, that "there were no cucumbers in the market this morning... not even for ready money". The sandwiches were once considered appropriate to offer to visiting clergy, in times when such visits were still a common feature of English middle-class life.

The popularity of the cucumber sandwich as an upper-class "dainty" reached its zenith in the Edwardian era, when cheap labour and plentiful coal enabled new techniques of producing cucumbers in hotbeds under glass through most of the year. With the declining popularity of tea as a meal in the United Kingdom, there was a corresponding decline in the popularity of cucumber sandwiches, but they are still frequently served at teas, luncheons, and gatherings. Most English cricket clubs supply malt vinegar and ground pepper to dash inside the sandwich.

Cucumber sandwiches are often eaten in the summer months or in warmer climates, such as in parts of India. The English influence on Indian culture has made the sandwiches popular during cricket matches and weekend picnics. The Indian variant is flavoured with green chutney and occasionally includes slices of boiled potatoes. Indian Airlines served cucumber sandwiches as part of its usual vegetarian inflight meal in short-haul domestic flights until 2011.

== Preparation ==
The most basic version of this sandwich consists of bread and cucumber slices. One recipe from 1919 gives the following instructions:

"Spread white bread with butter and a dash of mayonnaise dressing. Slice fresh cucumbers, soak in salt water, dip in vinegar and drain. Put between two bread slices and serve immediately."

Variants include the addition of chopped mint or meat (such as chicken), or substitution of brown bread for white bread.

== See also ==
- Benedictine sandwich, an American cucumber tea sandwich
- Canapé
- Cucumber cake
- Cucumber juice
- Cucumber sauce
- List of sandwiches
- Tea (meal)
