= Soubise sauce =

Onion sauce based on béchamel

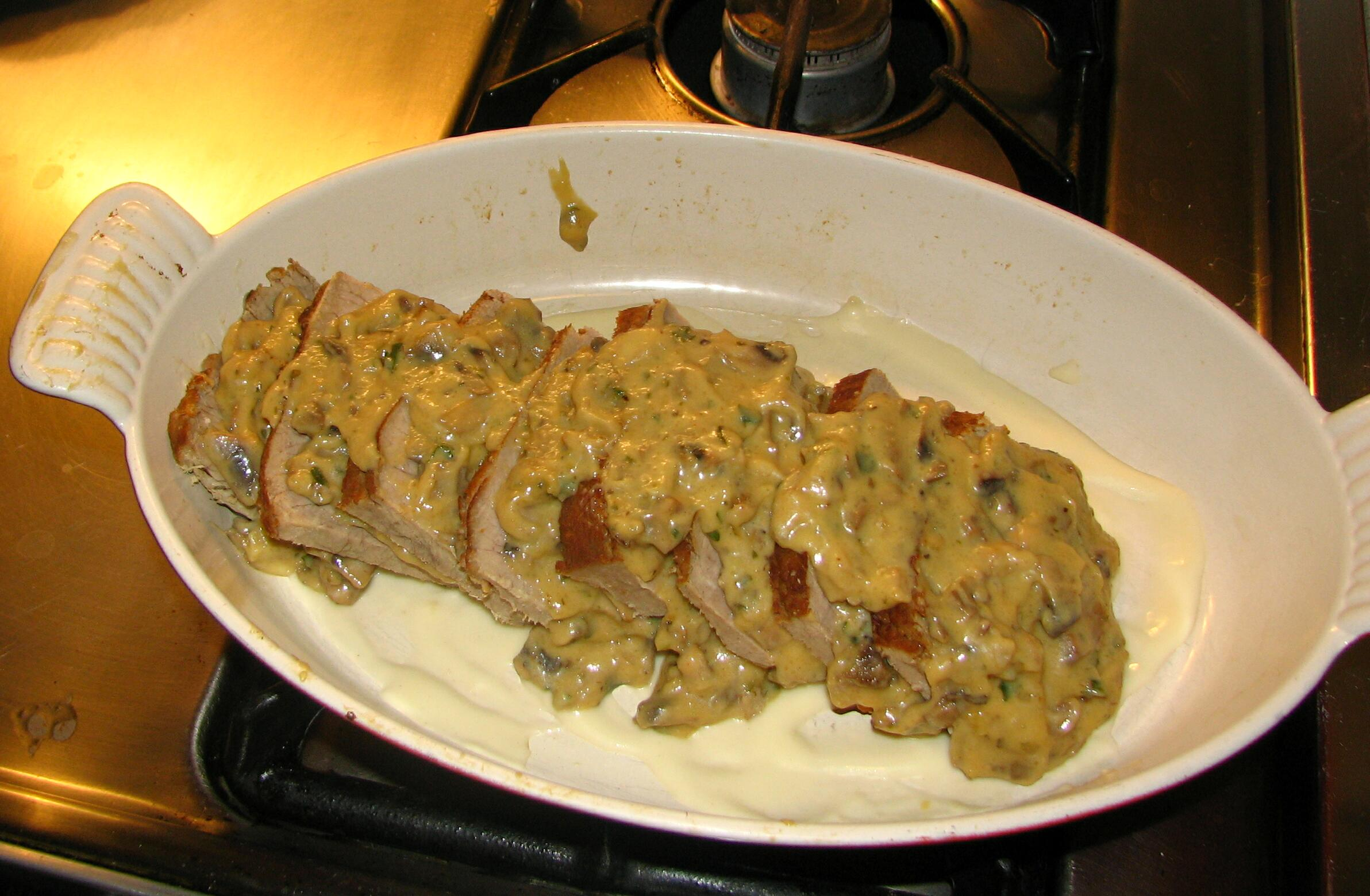
- Preparation of veal Orloff. The veal is covered by a soubise-mushroom sauce.
- Type: Sauce
- Main ingredients: Butter, onions

Soubise sauce is an onion sauce thickened with béchamel sauce, pounded cooked rice, or cream. It is generally served with meats, game, poultry and vegetables. It was formerly often used to coat meat. It is first documented in 1836.

== History ==
The sauce is said to take its name from Charles de Rohan, Prince de Soubise. Auguste Escoffier's recipe adds a thickened béchamel to butter-stewed onions. For a variant with rice and bacon fat, Escoffier cooks a high-starch rice (such as Carolina rice) with fatty bacon, onions and white consommé, then purées the onions and rice before finishing with the usual butter and cream. Tomato purée seasoned with paprika or curry can be added to either variation, but Escoffier notes that béchamel is preferred to rice for its smoother consistency.

The 19th-century Anglo-Italian cook Charles Elmé Francatelli serves the sauce over boiled pheasant with potato croquettes.

Eliza Acton, who said soubise was "the finest kind of onion sauce", serves it with lamb, suggesting any rich gravy or brown cucumber sauce as a substitute. It is among the sauces she recommends to be served with Fricandeau of veal. Her recipe for English soubise replaces the béchamel with rich veal gravy finished with cream.
