= Tea sandwich =

Sandwiches served with tea

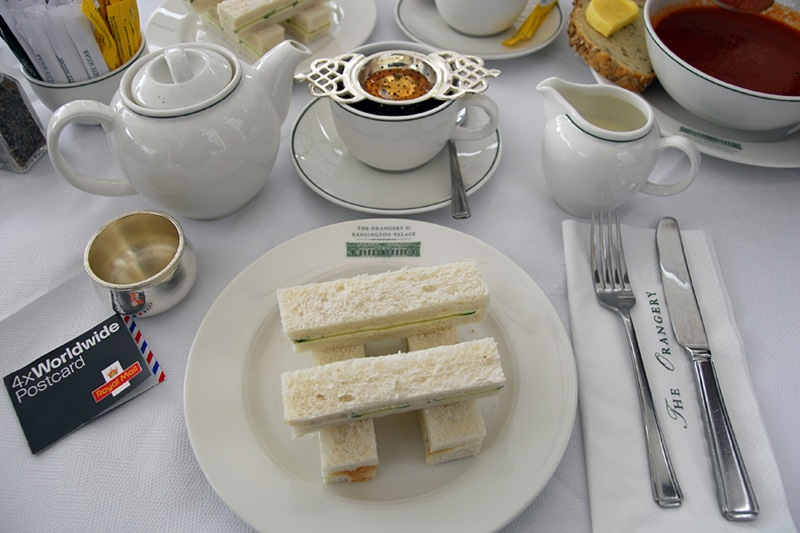
- Cucumber sandwiches and tea
- Type: Sandwich
- Course: Tea
- Place of origin: United Kingdom

A tea sandwich (also referred to as finger sandwich) is a small prepared sandwich typically sliced into pieces that can be picked up with one hand. It was originally developed in the 19th century as an offering at afternoon teatime meant to stave off hunger until the main meal, but has evolved into a term for any dainty crustless sandwich served at a variety of events.

== History and background ==
The drinking of tea in England became popular in the 1600s when Charles II and Catherine de Braganza made it fashionable. Because tea was expensive, only the wealthy could afford it, so drinking and serving tea was also an indicator of wealth. By the Victorian era, it had become affordable for all and was a popular beverage in all social strata.

Afternoon tea as a meal became popular in Britain around 1840, a time when the upper classes normally dined at 9pm or later. Anna Maria Stanhope, the 7th Duchess of Bedford, habitually requested a light snack of tea with bread and butter, cake, or biscuits in mid to late afternoon to tide her over until dinner was served. After she started inviting friends to join her in afternoon tea, the meal became popular. The new meal became popular throughout the country.

Tea sandwiches became popular in the US when tea parties were a common afternoon entertainment for the well-off. Recipes for tea sandwiches appeared in Mrs. Hill's New Cook Book (1867).

== Ingredients, preparation, and serving ==
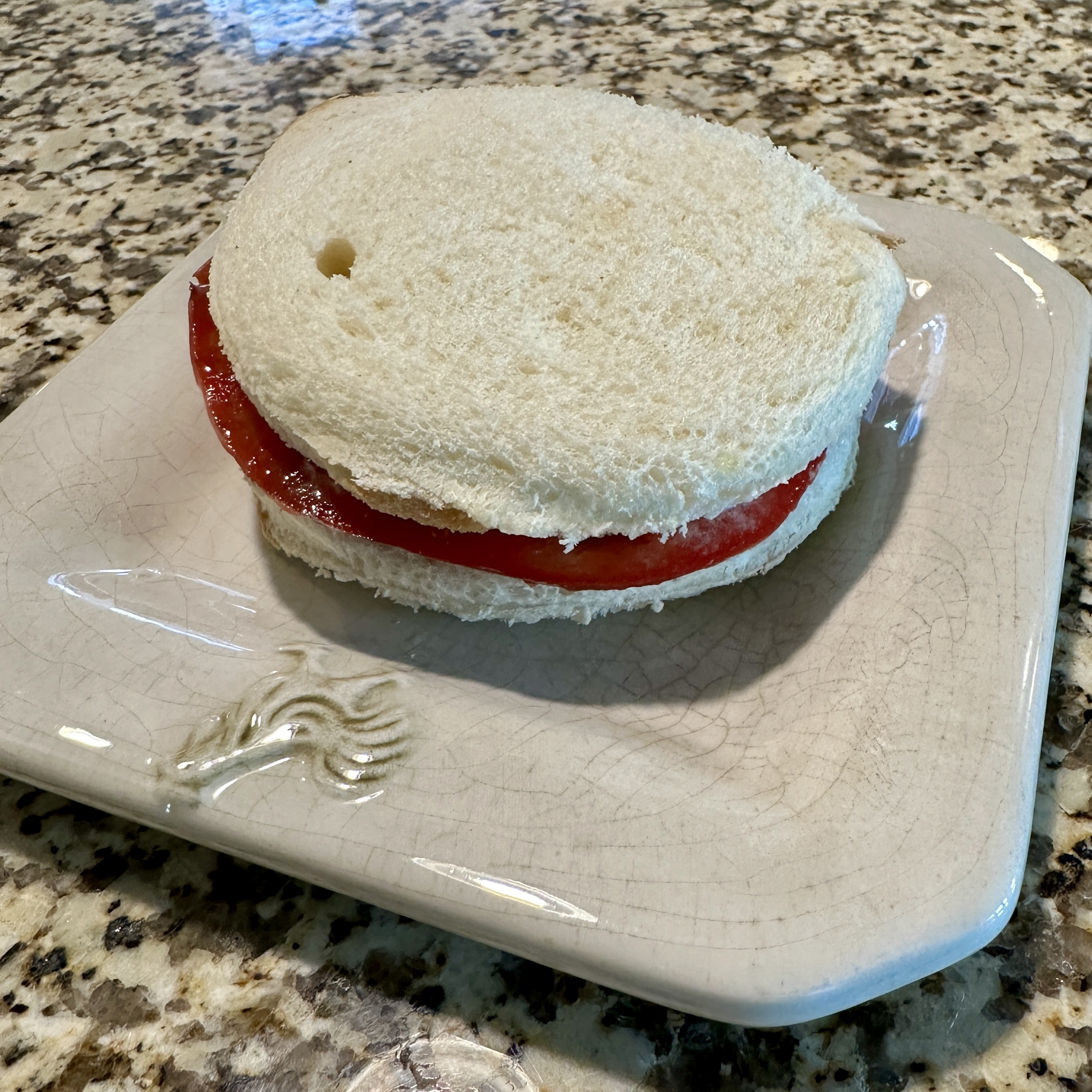
Vicksburg tomato sandwich

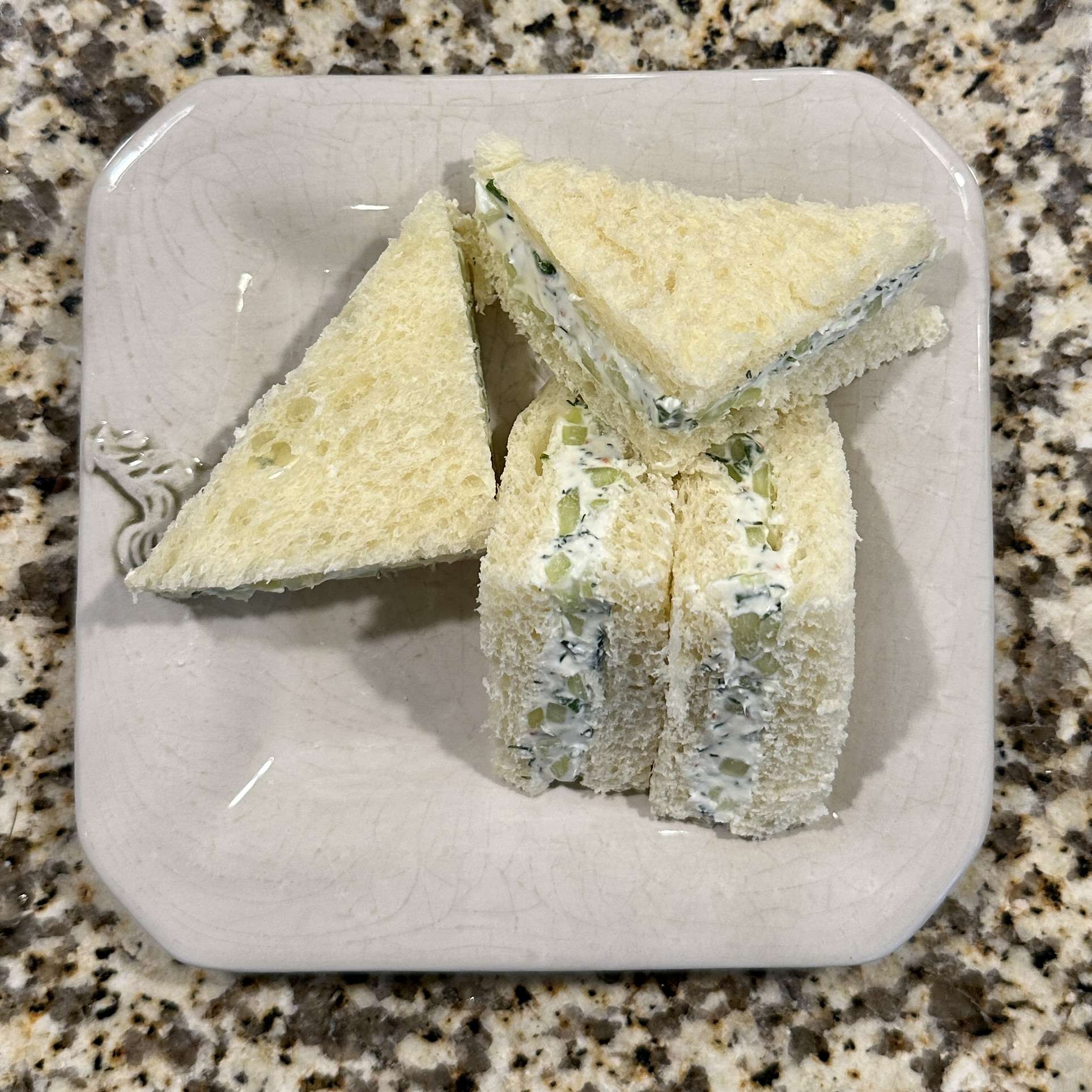
Benedictine sandwiches

The tea sandwich may take a number of different forms, but they typically are sized to be easy to handle with one hand and capable of being eaten in two or three bites. Shapes may be long and narrow, triangular, round, or a decorative shape created with a cookie cutter.

The bread is traditionally a soft white bread, thinly sliced, and buttered. The bread crust is cut away cleanly from the sandwich after the sandwich has been prepared but before serving. Modern bread variations might include wheat, pumpernickel, sour dough or rye bread. The bread used for preparing finger sandwiches is sometimes referred to as sandwich bread.

Fillings are light, and are "dainty" or "delicate" in proportion to the amount of bread. Spreads might include butter, cream cheese or mayonnaise mixtures, and the sandwiches often feature fresh vegetables such as radishes, olives, cucumber, asparagus, or watercress. The cucumber tea sandwich in particular is considered the quintessential tea sandwich. The Vicksburg tomato sandwich and the cucumber sandwich made with Benedictine are classic tea sandwiches in parts of the American South.

Other popular tea sandwich fillings include tomatoes, pimento cheese, ham with mustard, smoked salmon with cream cheese, fruit jam, curried chicken, fish paste, and egg salad.

== See also ==
- Canapé
- Cucumber sandwich
- Tapas
- Pinchos
- Tramezzino
- List of sandwiches
