= Gilda (snack) =

Gilda, Spanish tapas from Basque

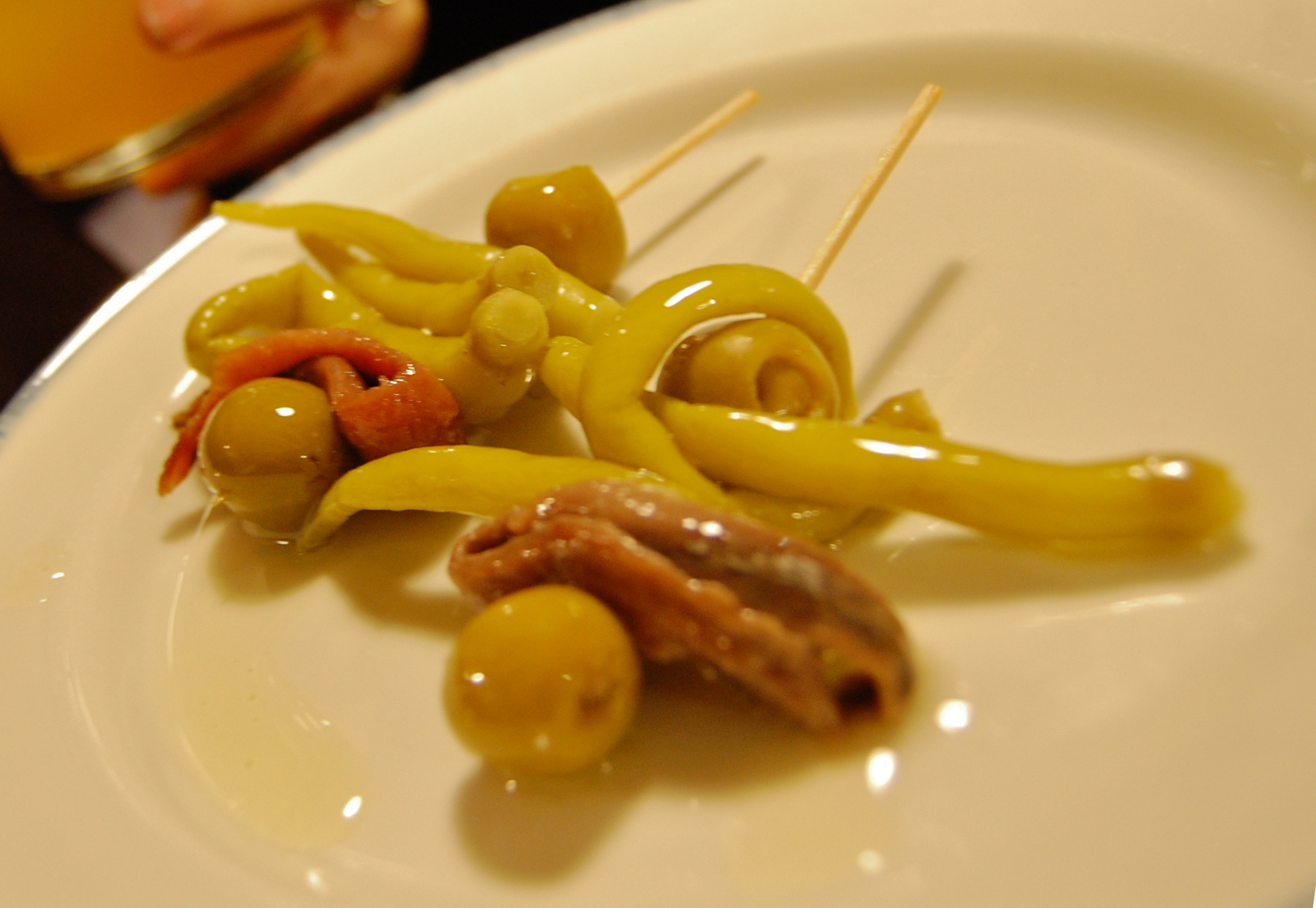
Plate of Gildas

A gilda is a type of skewered tapa or appetizer from Basque Country. It combines olives, chili peppers and a preserved fish, typically an anchovy, held together by a toothpick and pickled in vinegar. By skewering the ingredients, this dish is a pincho/pintxo, and it is considered the most famous skewer of its kind. It is commonly served in bars and traverns. Today, canning and pickling companies commonly distribute them pre-made.

== Name ==
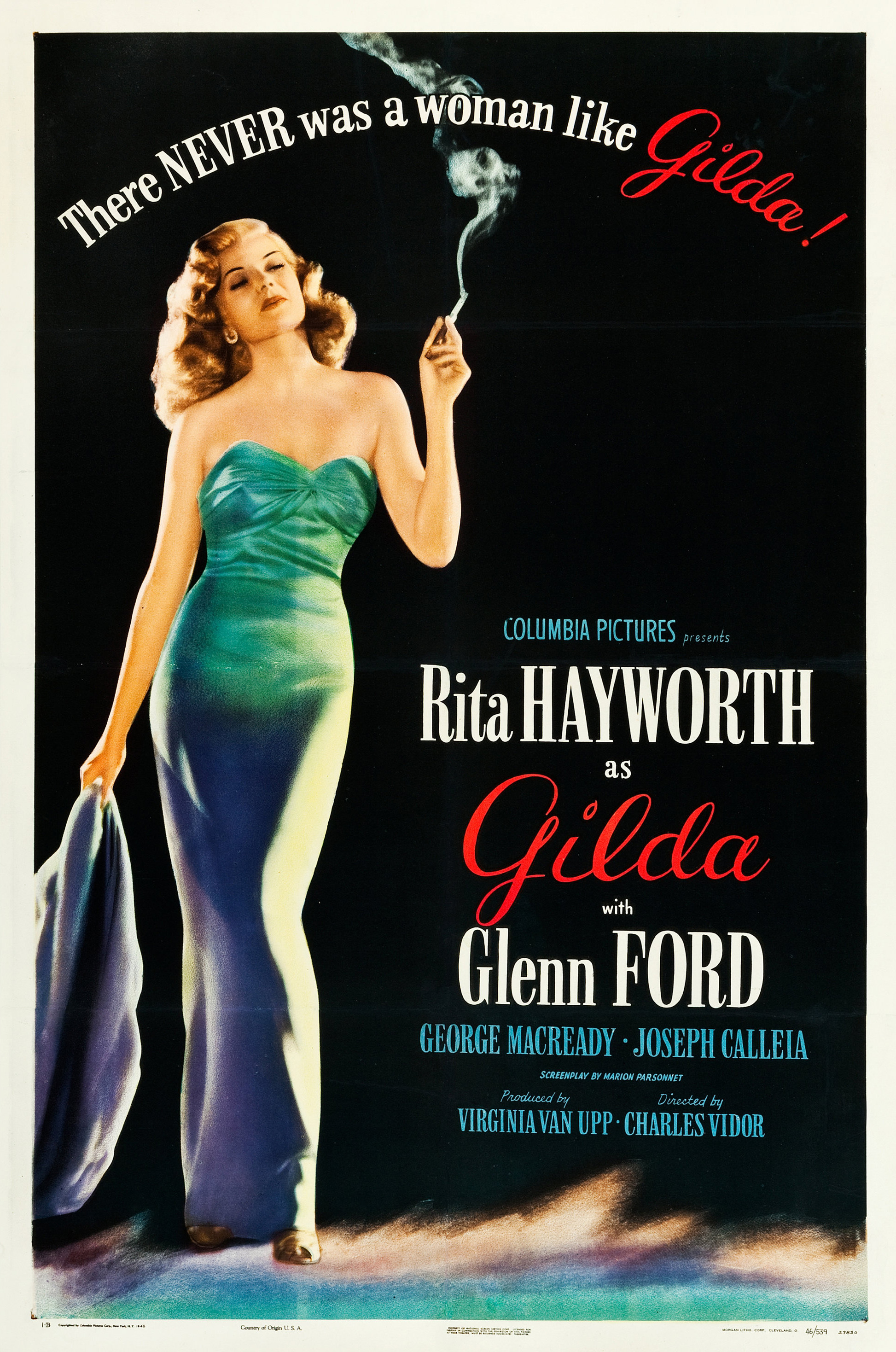
1946 film Gilda and namesake of the skewer

The name Gilda was first used in San Sebastian, in reference to the main character of the 1946 film Gilda, played by actress Rita Hayworth, as the skewer is "salty, green and a little spicy" (salada, verde y un poco picante).

== Origin ==
The invention of the Gilda as a skewer or pintxo is attributed to Blas Vallés, the owner of the bar, Casa Vallés, in 1948. It is considered as the first true pintxo in Basque culinary history, setting a standard for assembling ingredients on a single skewer at bar counters.
