= Cucumber cake =

Indian dessert

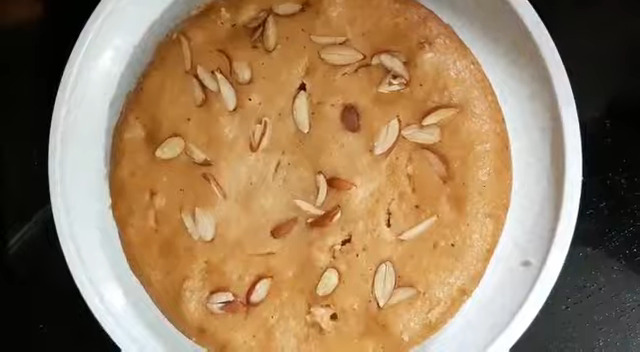
- Steamed tavsoli
- Type: Cake
- Course: Dessert
- Place of origin: Goa

Cucumber cake is a cake prepared using cucumber as a primary ingredient. Additional ingredients may include typical cake ingredients such as flour, sugar, eggs and leavening. It may be served as a dessert cake, and some versions are topped with an icing.

Cucumber cake may be referred to as tavsoli or tausali, and is a dish in Goan cuisine. Tavsoli is prepared using cucumber, and additional ingredients may include rice, coconut, jaggery, ghee, cashews and cardamom. Turmeric leaves may be placed atop the cake prior to baking, which adds flavor. It may be served as a breakfast dish, and may be prepared in the style of a dhokla and steamed.

== See also ==
- Cucumber sandwich
- List of cakes
- Zucchini bread
