= Tea party =

Gathering for afternoon tea

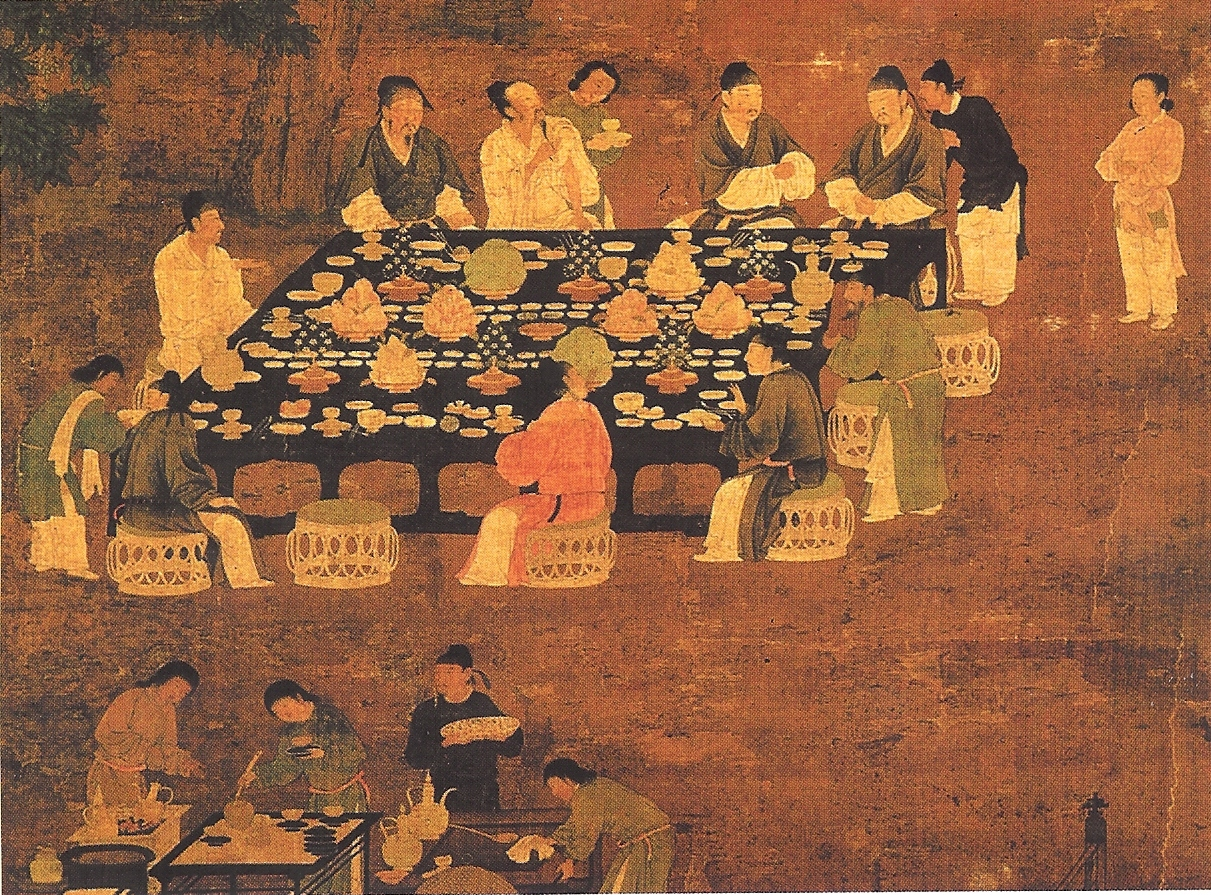
An Elegant Party (文會圖) depicts a tea party in Tang dynasty. The painting illustrated is a replica during Song dynasty.

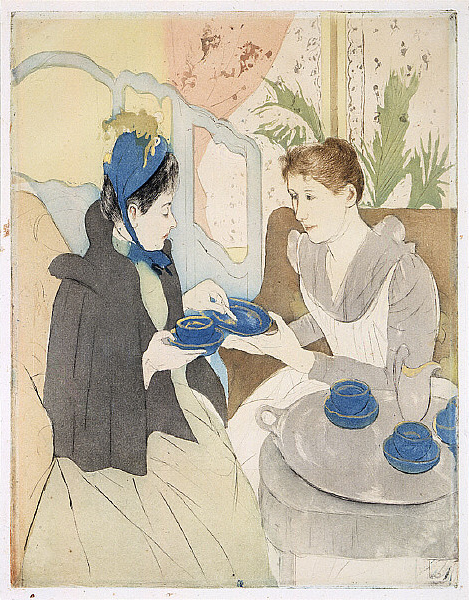
Afternoon Tea Party c. 1891, by Mary Cassatt

A tea party is a social gathering event featuring the consumption of tea, sometimes including light refreshments. Social tea drinking rituals are observed in many cultures worldwide, both historically and in the present day. There is a long history of social consumption of tea in China, depicted in words and paintings, as well as in neighbouring countries such as Japan. The custom of tea party spread from China to Europe, where it became part of European culture.

A European style tea party, typically held in the afternoon, typically features the consumption of loose leaf tea provided in a teapot along with milk and sugar. A variety of food including sandwiches, scones, cakes, pastries and biscuits are commonly served. Traditionally, the food served at tea parties changed seasonally. People typically consumed light foods such as fruit during summer and spring seasons and more substantial fare in autumn and winter.

Formal tea parties are generally characterised by the use of prestige utensils, such as porcelain, bone china or silver. Tables may be set with napkins and matching cups and plates.

In the past, afternoon tea parties were hosted at home as a social gathering. In the 21st century, specialised venues for tea parties or "high tea" are more commonplace.

== History ==
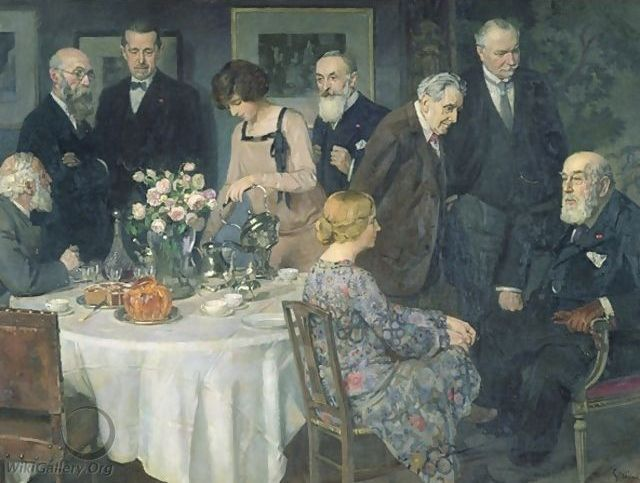
A Group of Artists, Paris c. 1929, by Jules-Alexandre Grün

=== Formal teas ===
Queen Victoria reportedly ordered "16 chocolate sponges, 12 plain sponges, 16 fondant biscuits" along with other sweets for a tea party at Buckingham Palace. The afternoon tea party became a feature of great houses in the Victorian and Edwardian ages in the United Kingdom and the Gilded Age in the United States, as well as in all continental Europe (France, Germany, and the Russian Empire). The formal tea party still survives as an event, as in the debutante teas of some affluent American communities.

Traditionally, servants stayed outside the room until needed. This was due to the rigidity of social conventions and also reflected the intimate nature of the afternoon tea. Proving the truth of 18th-century author Henry Fielding's quip that "love and scandal are the best sweeteners of tea", the custom of banning servants from the drawing room during tea shows the hostess's desire to encourage free conversation among her guests. Most of the formalities of that age have disappeared, particularly since World War II, when economic changes made household servants a rarity, but afternoon tea can still provide a good opportunity for intimate conversation and a refreshing light meal.

Queen Elizabeth II's favourite tea cakes were honey and cream sponge and chocolate biscuit cake. Tea sandwiches might include smoked salmon, egg mayonnaise or ham and mustard among other offerings. Crustless triangle shaped tuna sandwiches can be served on buttered loaves with thinly sliced cucumbers.

=== "Kettle drums" ===
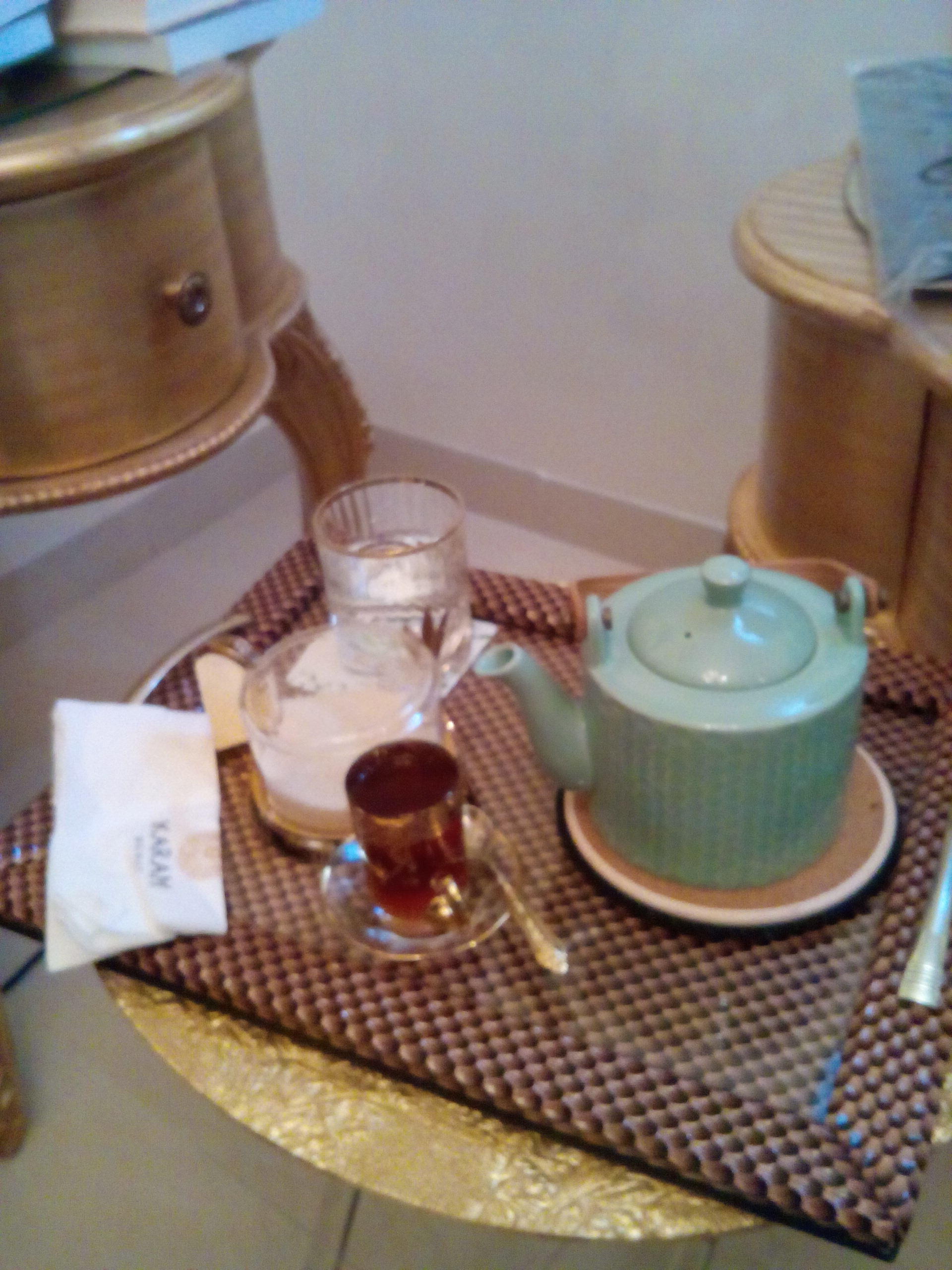
Tea table

"Kettle drums" came about in 18th and 19th centuries and are informal large afternoon parties for tea. At kettle drums, guests traditionally came for short periods and left at will, mingled and conversed with little formality, and partook of tea, chocolate, lemonade, cakes, and sandwiches. Guests were expected to dress for ordinary daytime visiting, but not more formally.

Per false folk etymology, the name "kettle drum" is said to have originated in the informal tea gatherings hosted by British camp officers' wives during East India Company rule or the British occupation of India, during which kettle drums are claimed to have served as tea tables in the camps. Alternatively, "kettle drum" may have been an amalgam of "drum" — 18th-century slang for a vivacious party — and "kettle" for the tea served.

== Etiquette ==
Tea party etiquette depends on the customs and accepted standards of behaviour of a given time period and place. 1900 etiquette demonstrated etiquette to be linked with conservative and rigid gender roles. Manners were of utmost importance in the proper conduct of men and women in early tea parties.

There are several rules of etiquette noted during the 19th and 20th centuries. Various rules of etiquette included:

1. Learn to be patient
2. Restrain your temper
3. Refrain from speaking in anger
4. Silence is more valuable than speech

== Children's parties ==
Tea parties are sometimes hosted by young children where the guests consist of stuffed animals, dolls, friends (both real and imaginary) and family members.

== Representations in literature ==
The mad tea-party from Wonderland c. 1865, illustrated by John Tenniel

In Lewis Carroll's Alice's Adventures in Wonderland, in the chapter "A Mad Tea-Party", Alice becomes a guest at a tea party along with the March Hare, the Hatter, and a sleeping Dormouse who remains asleep for most of the chapter. The other characters give Alice many riddles and stories, including the famous 'Why is a raven like a writing desk?'. The Hatter reveals that they have tea all day because time has punished him by eternally standing still at 6 pm (tea time). Alice becomes insulted and tired of being bombarded with riddles and she leaves, claiming that it was the craziest tea party that she had ever attended.

== Global analogues ==
- Yum cha is the Chinese equivalent of a tea party, usually held in a restaurant.
- The German "Kaffeeklatsch", literally "coffee gossip", is an afternoon gathering – stereotypically of housewives – in which coffee or tea is drunk, cakes are eaten, and gossip is exchanged.

== See also ==
- British tea culture
- Coffee break
- Japanese tea ceremony
- Tea
- Tea ceremony
- Tea culture
- Tea dance
- Tea sandwich
- Tea set
