= Finger food =

Food to be consumed without utensils

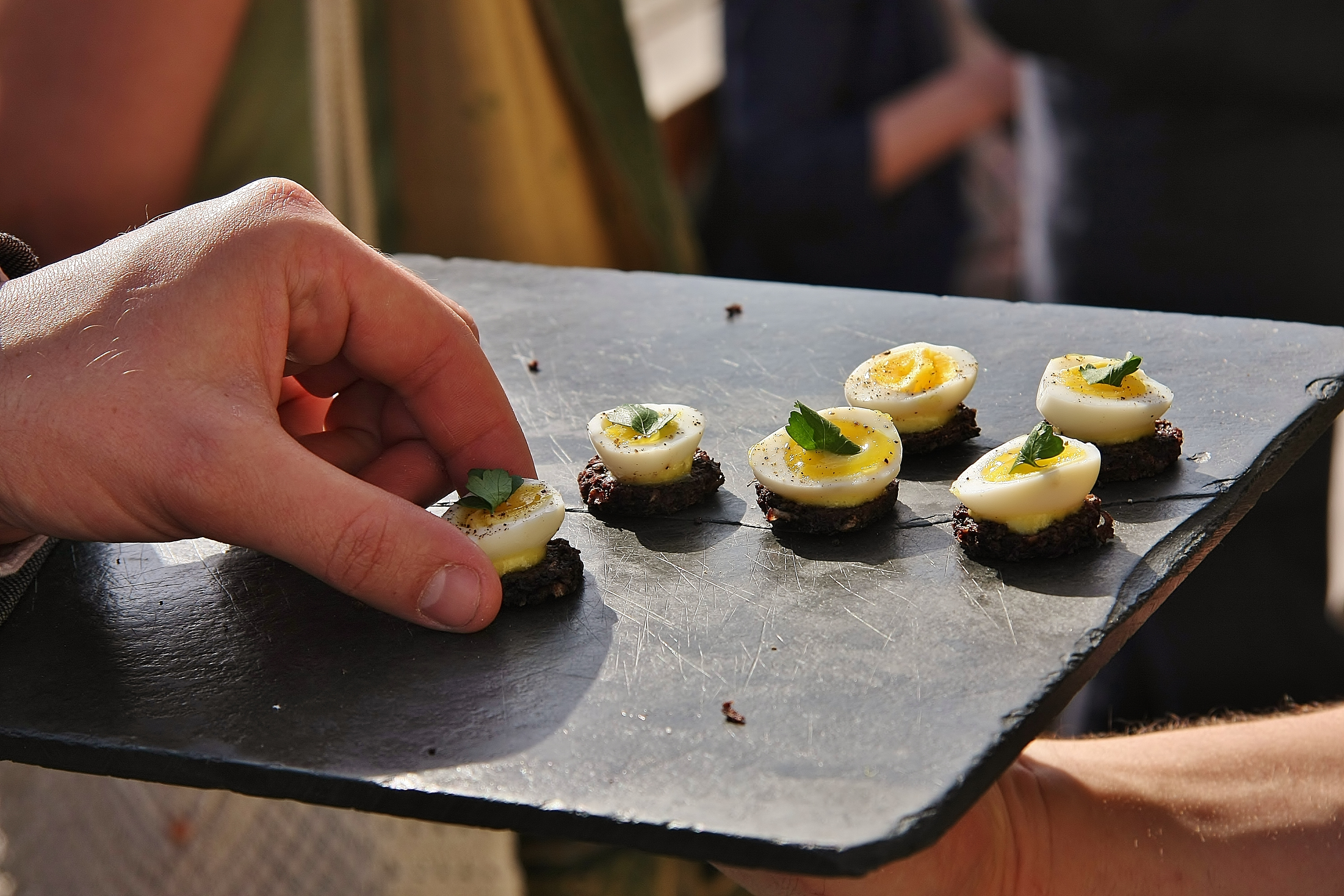
Finger food egg canapés

Finger foods are small, individual portions of food that are eaten out of hand. They are often served at social events. The ideal finger food usually does not create any mess (such as crumbs or drips), but this criterion is often overlooked in order to include foods like tacos. One origin for finger foods is the French canapé.

== History ==
=== Middle Ages ===
Finger foods do not share common origin, history, or identity. Most of them originate in hors d'oeuvre such as the canapé. During the Middle Ages formal French meals were served with entremets between the serving of plates. These secondary dishes could be either actual food dishes, or elaborate displays and even dramatic or musical presentations. In the 14th century, recipes for entremets were mostly made with meat, fish, pork and vegetables. By the 15th century the elaborate display and performances were served up between courses, and could be edible or displays of subjects relevant to the host, created in butter sculpture or other types of crafted work.

=== 1600s to early 1900s ===
With the introduction in the 1600s of service à la française, where all the dishes are laid out at once in very rigid symmetrical fashion, entremets began to change in meaning but were still mainly savoury. Along with this came elaborate silver and ceramic table displays as well as pièces montées. The entremets were placed between the other dishes within the main work of the meal. One kind of finger food is the French canapé, known since the late 1700s. Canapés began as slices of toasted or fried bread with various toppings. Their name, literally 'sofa', was inspired from how the toppings "sat" on the bread as though it were a sofa. Over time, canapés became a word to describe all finger foods served at parties.

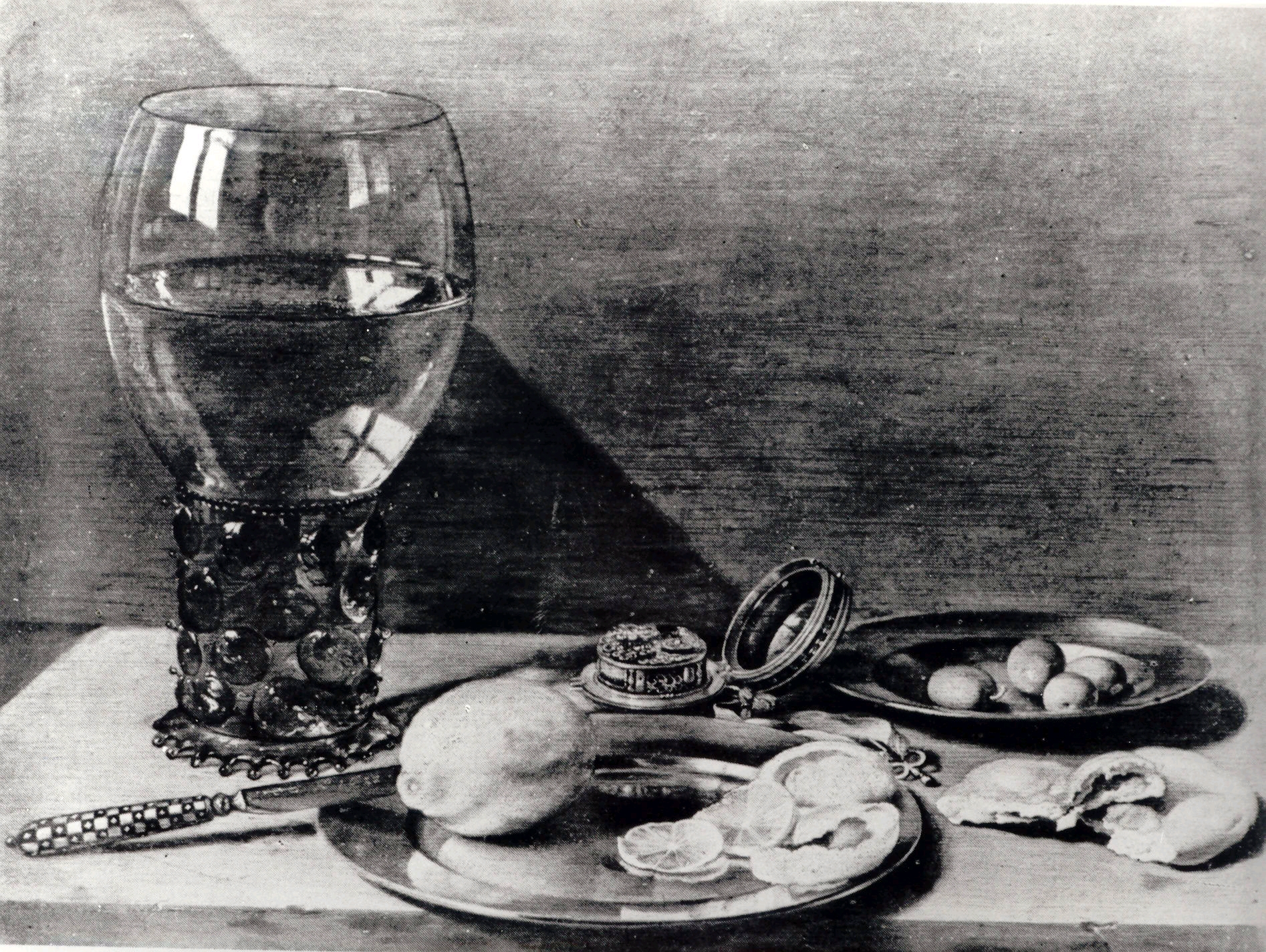
Hors-d'oeuvres (1623) by Pieter Claesz

Drinks before dinner became a custom towards the end of the 19th century. As this new fashion caught on, the British took inspiration from the French to begin serving hors d'oeuvres before dinner. A cocktail party is considered a small gathering with mixed drinks and light snacks. Hors d'oeuvres may be served as the only food offering at cocktail parties and receptions, where no dinner is served afterward. After the end of prohibition in the United States, the cocktail party gained acceptance. Prior to the First World War, American dinner guests would be expected to enter the dining room immediately where drinks would be served at the table with appetisers. This changed by the 1920s, when hors d'oeuvres were served prior to a non-alcoholic cocktail. However, after the repeal of Prohibition in the United States, cocktail parties became popular with many different hors d'oeuvres meant as something to help counter the stronger drinks. It is the cocktail party that helped transfer the hors d'oeuvres from the formal dining table to the mobility of the serving tray. These appetisers passed around the cocktail party may also be referred to as canapés.

=== American prohibition ===
Canapés were often served in speakeasies during American Prohibition. Following the enactment of American Prohibition laws in 1920, many people drank in secret, often in speakeasies. To ensure that guests did not appear intoxicated after leaving to avoid detection, speakeasies often served finger foods throughout the night. These finger foods also allowed guests to eat while drinking because of the food's small size.

After Prohibition, canapés were often served at cocktail parties.

== Modern finger foods ==
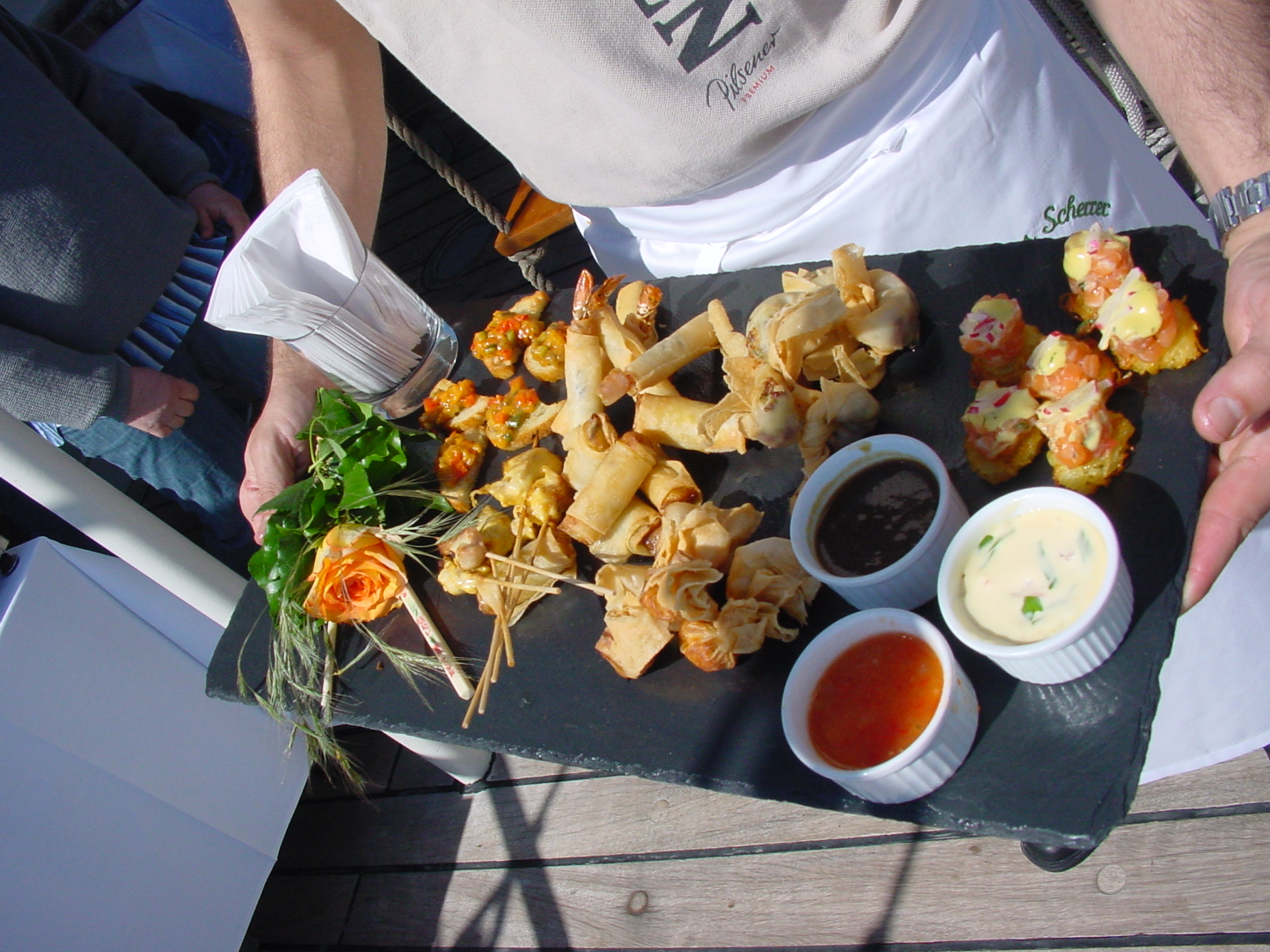
Finger foods being served

Finger foods appear at both casual and more formal events. While more informal finger foods reign supreme at sporting events and casual gatherings, upscale versions—often termed passed hors d'oeuvres—are found at weddings, corporate events, and fancy receptions. There is a wide variety of finger foods.

Finger foods are easy to prepare, portable, and diverse to suit various tastes. They can serve as both quick bites and key components of meals, making adaptations that blur the line between casual and formal dining. Contemporary finger foods are often served as fast food as well as at formal events.

=== Fast food ===
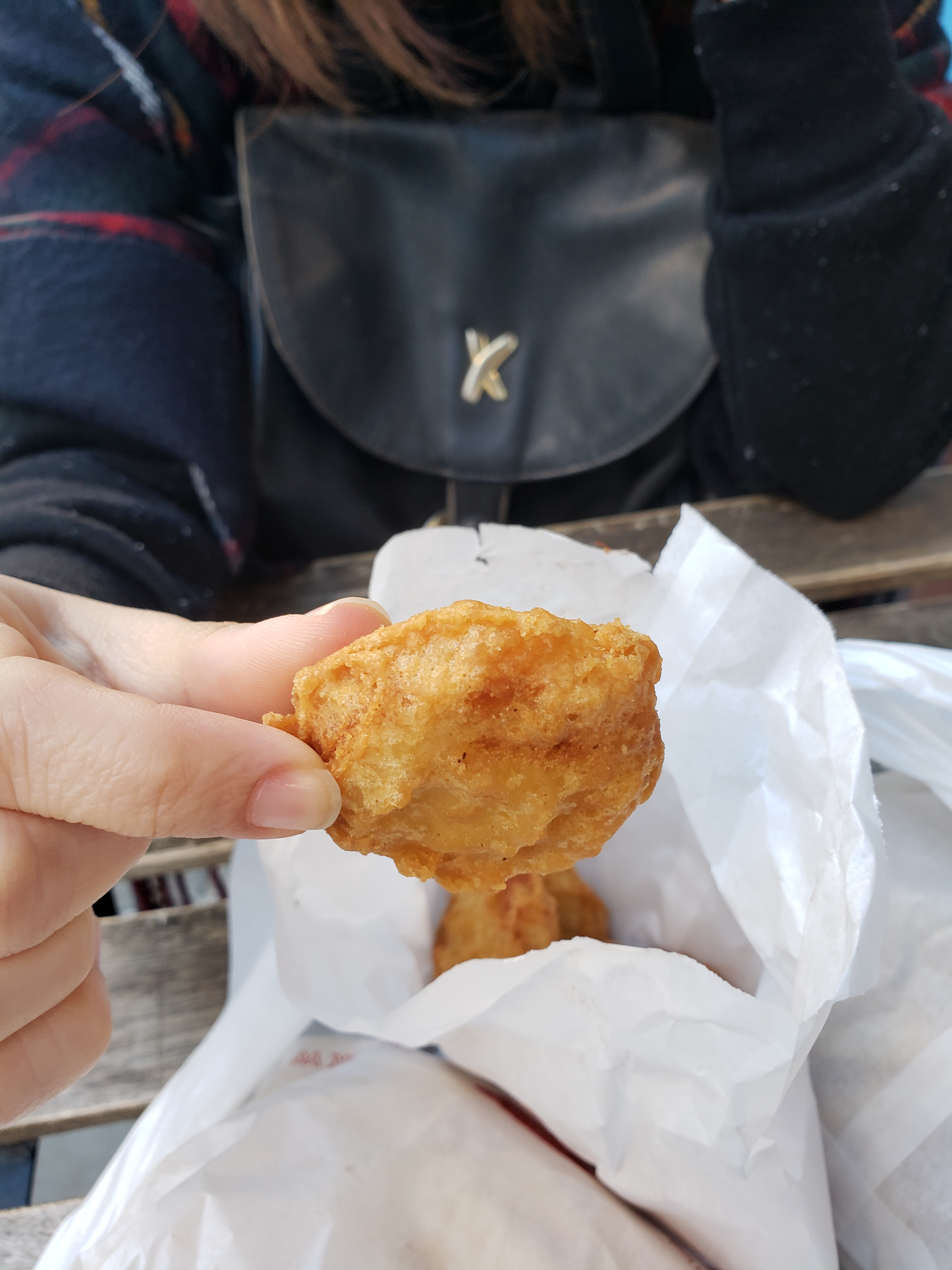
Chicken nugget

Most fast food is finger food. Finger food is quick to eat, and can be eaten on the go. For producers, the simple recipes of finger foods allows them to create new menu options that share ingredients.

=== Parties and events ===
Finger foods are often served at formal events and celebrations in the form of passed hors d'oeuvre, where they create a casual, relaxed atmosphere and keep guests' hands and fingers entertained.

The Super Bowl is one of the biggest modern showcases for finger foods. Super Bowl Sunday has become known for casual finger foods like sliders, nachos, and Buffalo wings, invented in 1964 at Anchor Bar in Buffalo, New York. These foods capture the ultimate convenience and camaraderie with contemporary finger food, providing guests with various bites as they move about.

== Regional and cultural differences ==
Finger foods are diverse worldwide, with different cultures having their traditions, foods, and social customs that dictate what finger foods are. In some cultures, these small bites may be considered appetizers, snacks, or even main dishes.

=== Mediterranean finger foods ===
Finger foods abound in the Mediterranean region, often called meze, antipasti, or hors d’oeuvres. They include hummus and pita bread, dolmas (stuffed grape leaves), and several marinated olives and cheeses. In Southern Europe, small toasted bread topped with savory ingredients, such as crostini and bruschetta, are also popular in Italy. Tapas in Spain offer myriad choices, including patatas bravas, albondigas (meatballs), and jamón ibérico.

=== Halal and Middle Eastern finger foods ===
Middle Eastern cultures have brought many finger foods in the halal diet. Favorites include falafel, kibbeh, samosas, and spreads such as baba ghanoush, served with fresh flatbreads. These meals prioritize robust spices, fresh herbs, and wholesome ingredients.
