= Benedictine (spread) =

Spread/dip made with cucumbers and cream cheese

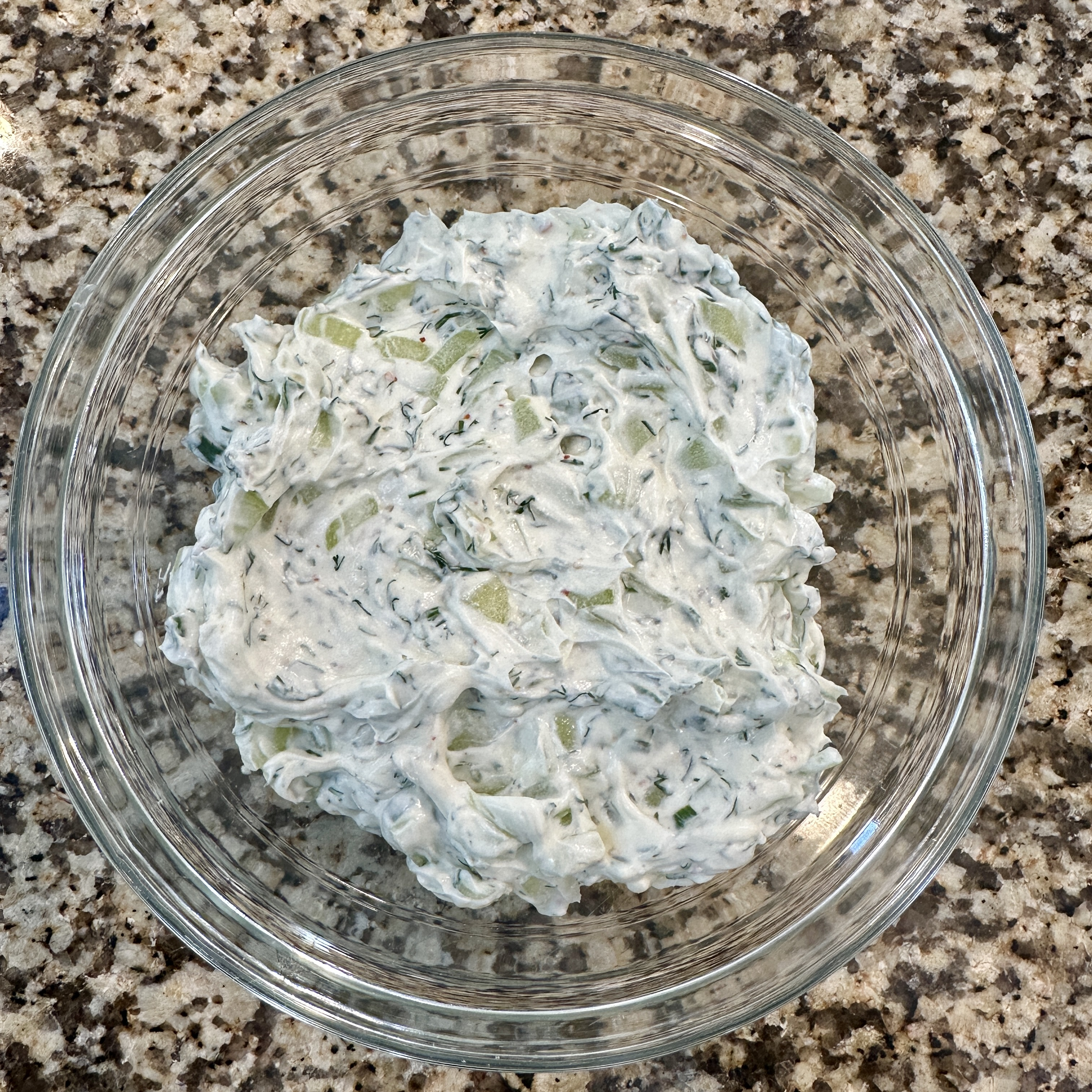
- Benedictine spread, which is used as a filling for Benedictine sandwiches
- Type: Sandwich filling
- Place of origin: United States
- Region or state: Louisville, Kentucky
- Created by: Jennie Carter Benedict
- Serving temperature: Cold or room temperature
- Main ingredients: Cucumbers, cream cheese
- Ingredients generally used: Onion, mayonnaise

Benedictine or Benedictine spread is a spread made with cucumbers and cream cheese. Invented near the beginning of the 20th century, it was originally and still is used for making Benedictine sandwiches, a type of cucumber sandwich, but it also has been used as a dip or combined with meat in a sandwich. This spread can be obtained pre-made from some Louisville, Kentucky-area grocery stores.

Although Benedictine is rarely seen in restaurants outside the state of Kentucky, it has been the subject of reporting in national publications such as The New York Times, The Washington Post, and Saveur Magazine, and by multimedia content publishers including the Food Network and National Public Radio.

A Benedictine-based sandwich was featured on the Food Network's 50 States 50 Sandwiches program in 2012, on the television shows of celebrity chefs Paula Deen and Damaris Phillips, in Southern Living magazine as one of June's "2011 Best Recipes" for their corresponding issue, in Garden & Gun magazine, in PopSugar, and in the Smithsonian's Folklife Magazine.

== History ==
Benedictine spread and the Benedictine sandwich were invented around the end of the 19th century by Jennie Carter Benedict (1860–1928), a caterer, restaurateur and cookbook author in Louisville, Kentucky. Benedict opened a kitchen providing catering services in 1893, and in 1900 opened a restaurant and tea room called "Benedict's". It was potentially during Jennie Benedict's catering period when she developed and originally served Benedictine.

Benedict's cookbooks are still in print; The Blue Ribbon Cook Book, first published in 1902, has been reprinted at least as recently as 2008. Although early editions of this book do not contain a recipe for the spread, the 2022 edition does.

== Ingredients and preparation ==
The original Benedictine recipe by Benedict, as reported by the Louisville Courier-Journal and NPR, included cream cheese, cucumber juice, onion juice, salt, cayenne pepper, and a slight amount of green food coloring.

Modern variants of the recipe typically call for grated or chopped cucumber, chopped onions, mayonnaise, and dill, and often omit the food coloring.

Benedictine sandwiches are typically served as a type of tea sandwich or finger sandwich, with crusts trimmed and the sandwich cut into four pieces, either fingers or triangles, to make them convenient to eat with one hand. Garden & Gun called them Kentucky's answer to the pimiento cheese sandwich.

Preparation of Benedictine sandwiches
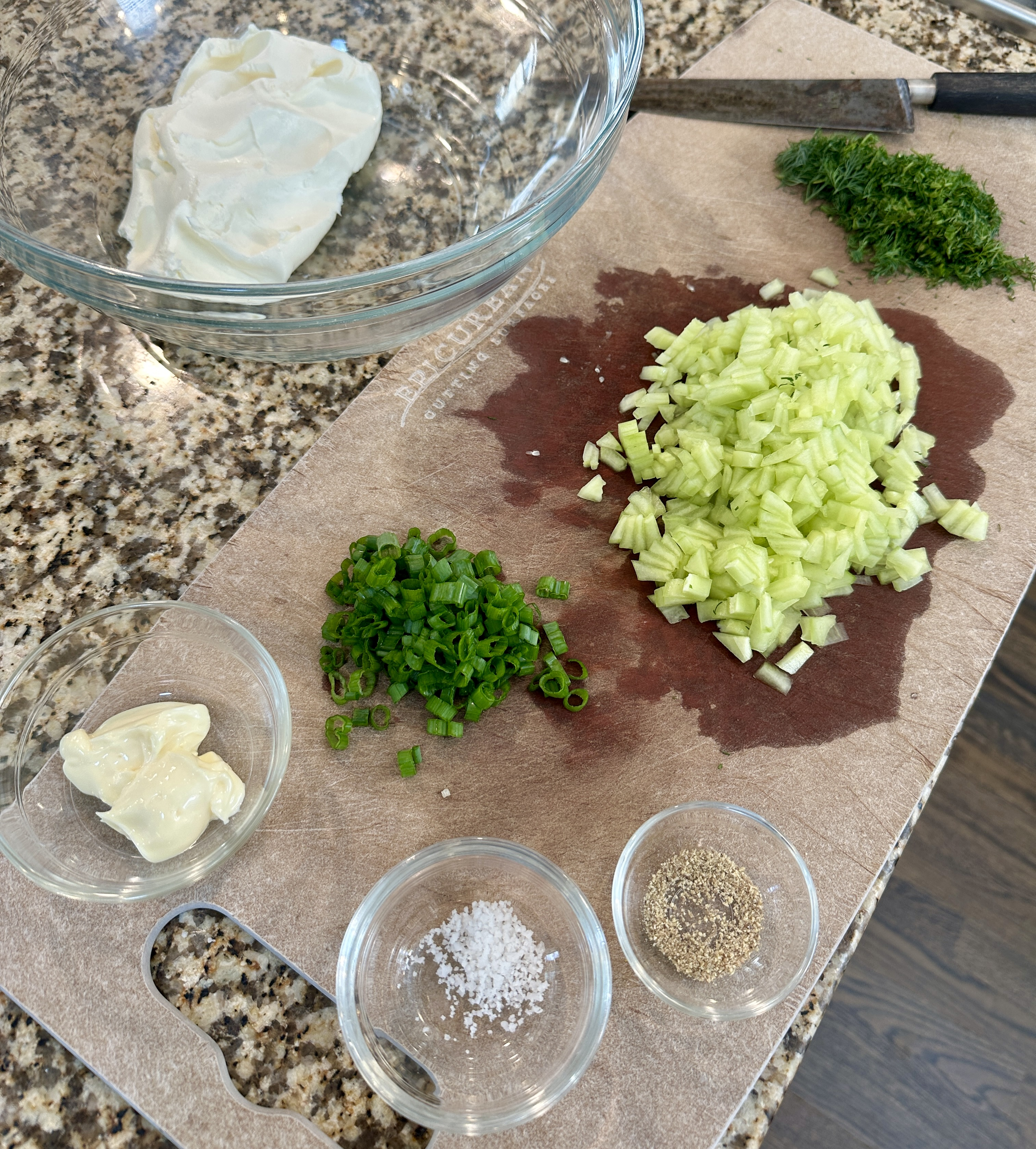
Ingredients for Benedictine spread: cream cheese, green onions, mayonnaise, salt, pepper, chopped cucumbers, dill

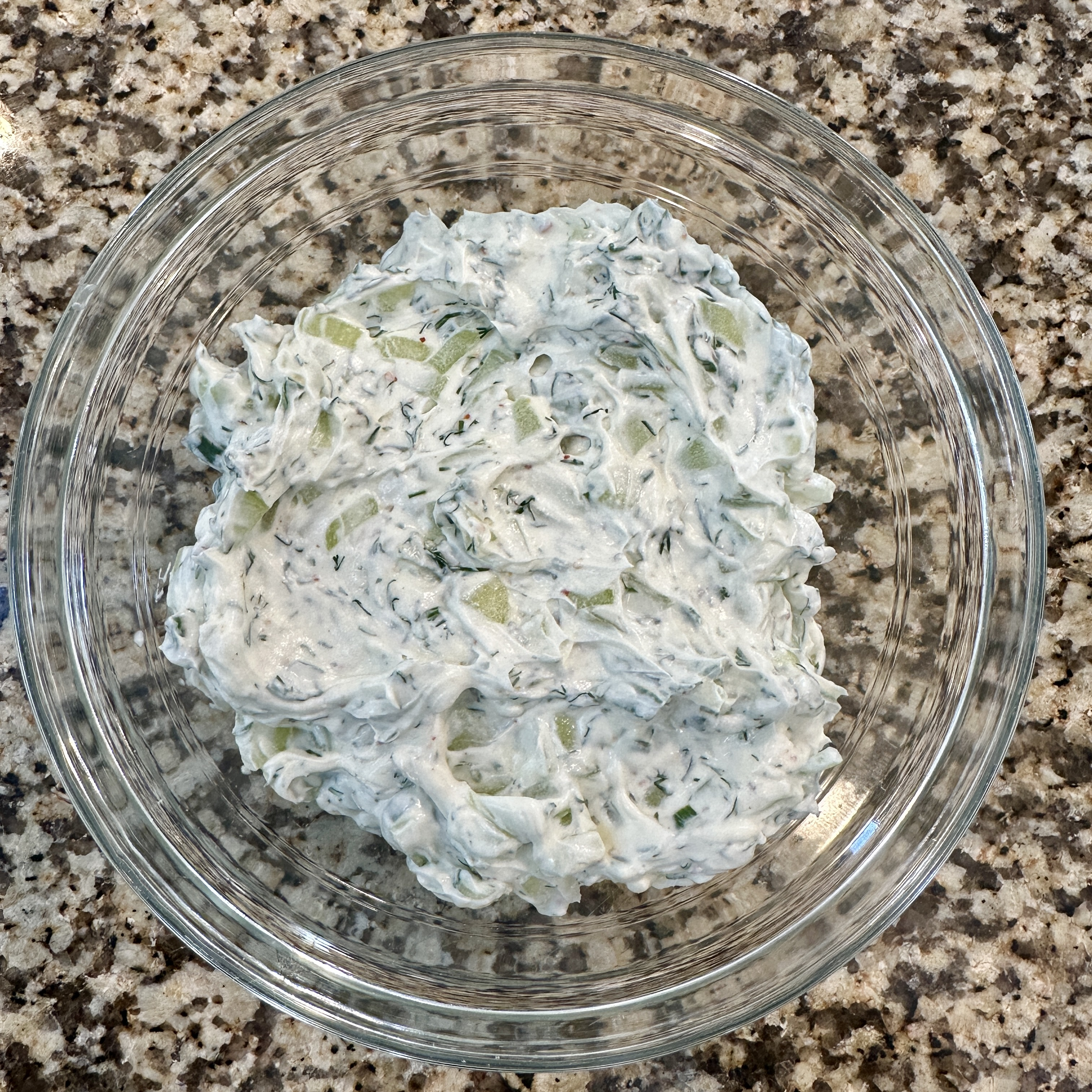
Benedictine spread

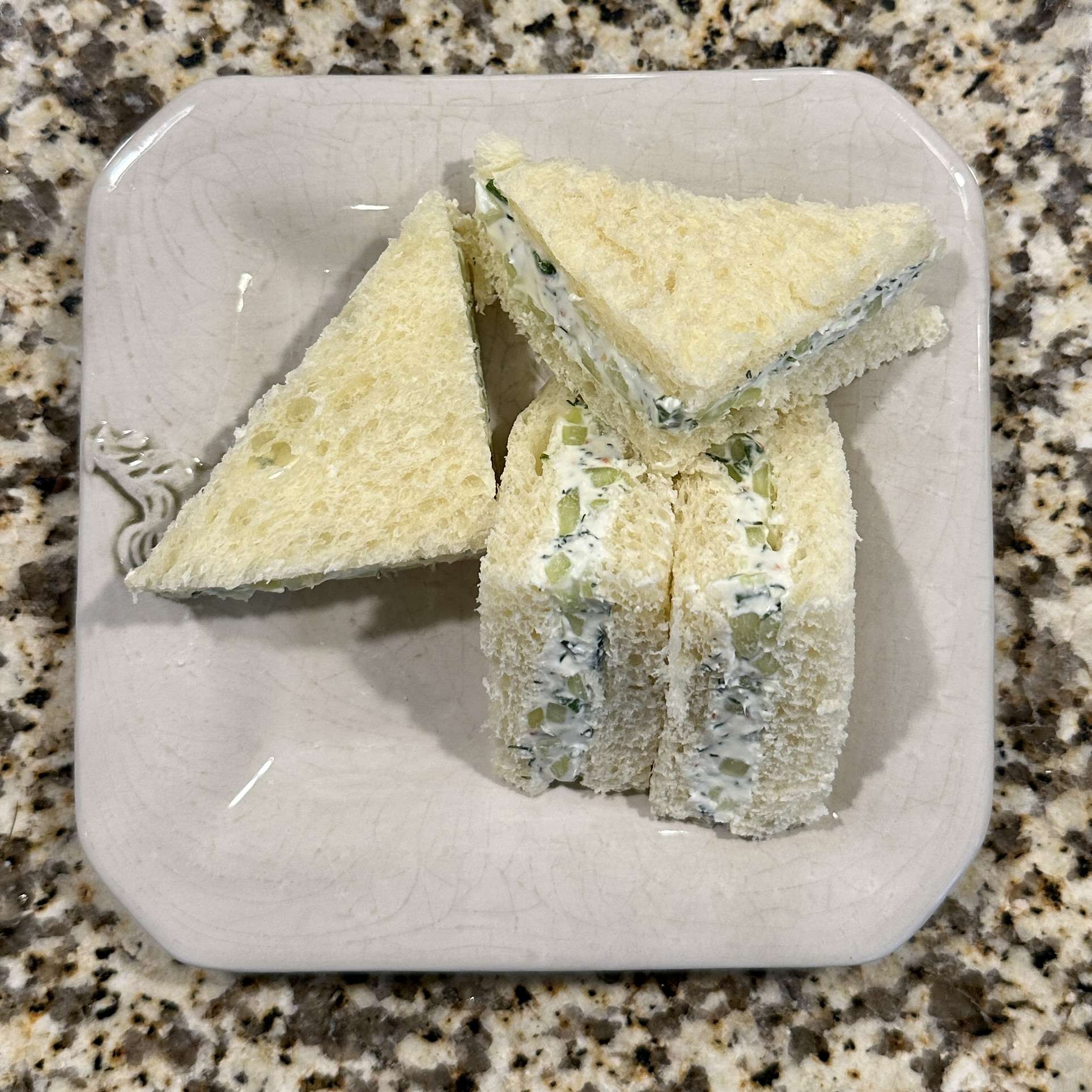
Benedictine tea sandwiches

== See also ==
- Pimento cheese
- Tzatziki
- Cuisine of Kentucky
- History of Louisville, Kentucky
- List of common dips
- List of sandwiches
