= Mixed grill =

Dish of multiple grilled meats

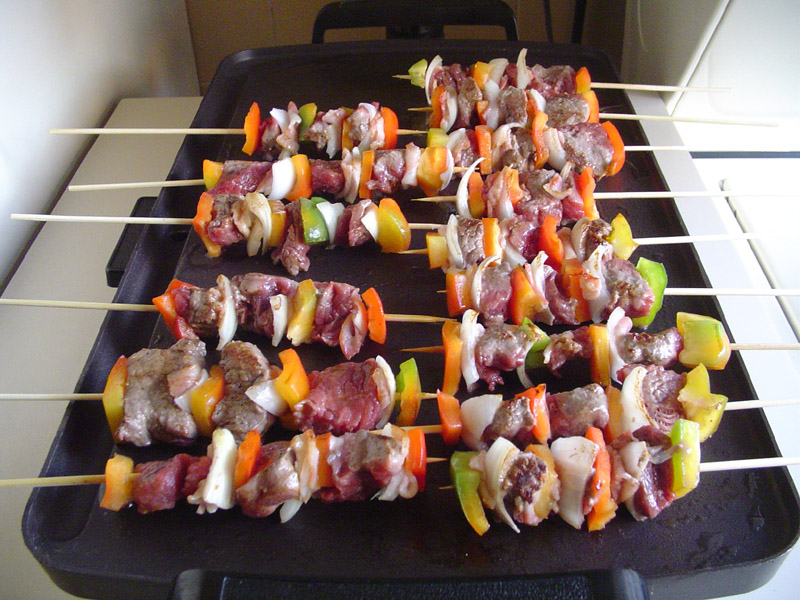
Mixed grill skewers ready to be barbecued in Venezuela

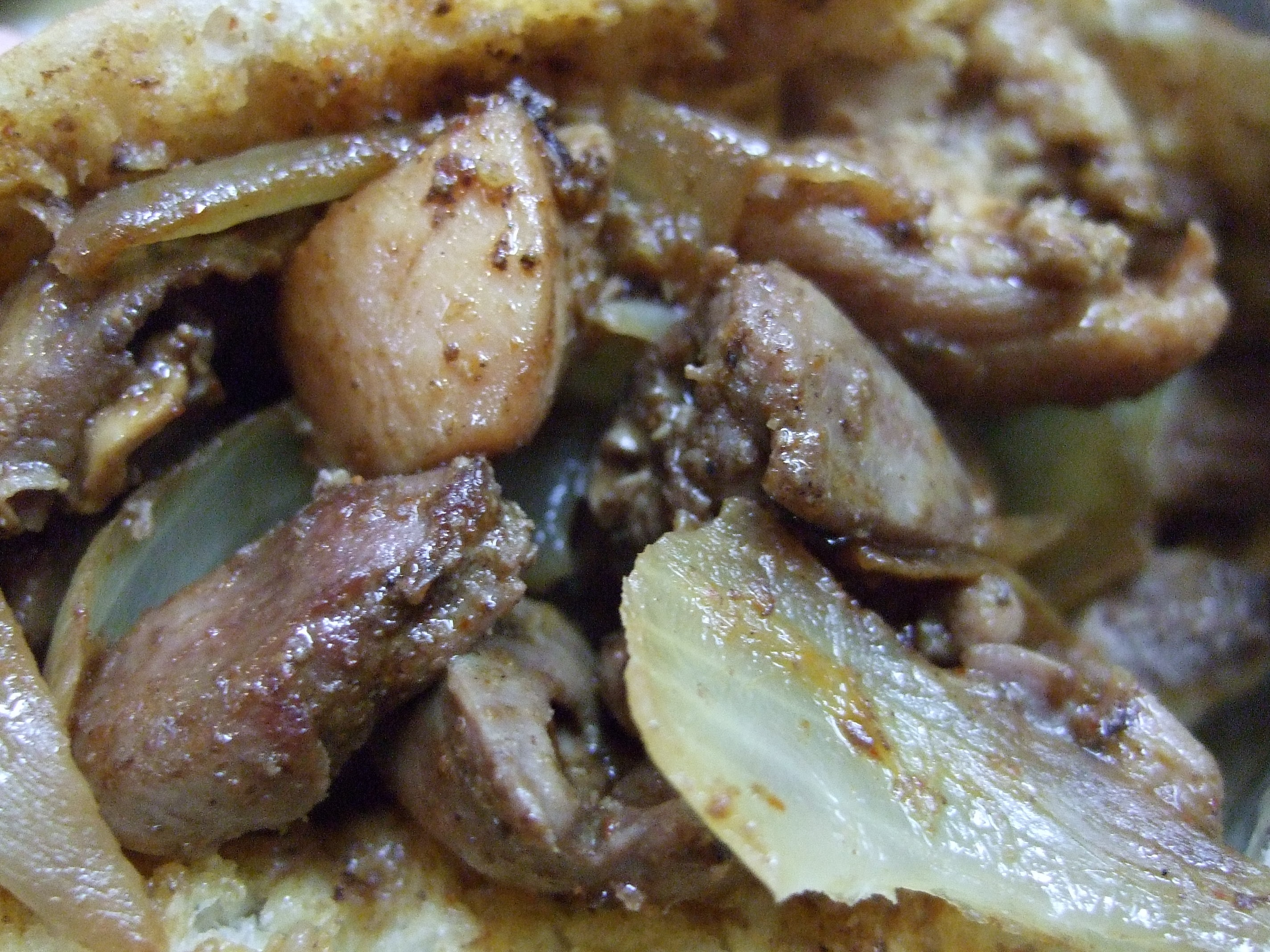
Meurav Yerushalmi, Jerusalem mixed grill

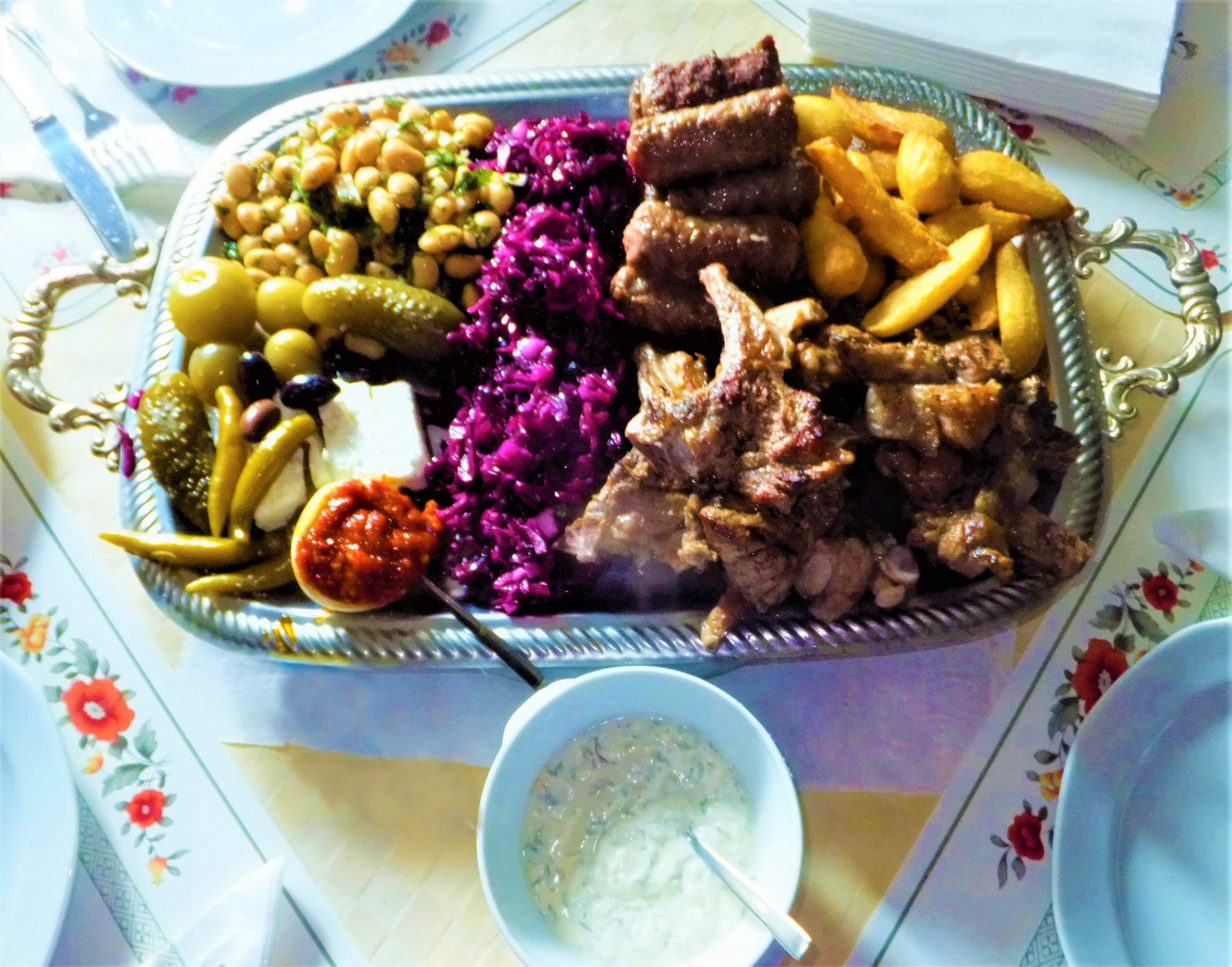
Romanian mixed grill with mititei

In many cuisines, a mixed grill is a dish consisting of an assortment of grilled meats.

== List of mixed grill dishes ==
=== Latin America and the Iberian Peninsula ===
- Churrasco – typically featuring various cuts of chicken and beef, especially chicken hearts and picanha (rump cover)
- Latin American and Spanish barbecued pinchitos – Mixed grill, barbecued meat and vegetables on sticks, known as pinchos, pinchos americanos, brochetas, or anticuchos in Central and South America. These barbecued pinchos may include pieces of beef, pork, chicken, fish or shark, Mexican chorizo (or sausage), kidney, or liver, among others.
- Brazilian Espetinhos
- Argentinian asado - featuring cuts of beef, kidney, liver and sausages (especially chorizo and morcilla, a form of blood sausage)

=== Turkey and the Balkans ===
- Turkish mixed grill - may include adana kebab, shish kebab, lamb chops, kofte, and chicken wings
- Bulgarian mixed grill (meshana skara) – typically pork, pork chops, sausages or minced meat made into meatballs or other shapes
- Hungarian mixed grill (fatányéros) – may feature meat chops, thin meat steaks and rablohús (grilled meat skewers)
- Romanian mixed grill (grătar mixt) - often includes meat chops, mititei (meat rolls) and thin meat steaks

=== Other regions ===
- Italy: grigliata mista typically features chicken (often marinated in olive oil, garlic, lemon and rosemary), beef and pork
- Jerusalem: Jerusalem mixed grill (Me'orav Yerushalmi; מעורב ירושלמי), contains chicken hearts, livers, spleen and bits of lamb grilled with onion, garlic, and spices.
- Australia: Similar to the English version (see below), it usually consists of bacon, lamb chops, rump steak, beef or pork sausages, eggs, lamb's fry, and occasionally tomatoes and pineapple.
- England: Consists of several selections of lamb chops, pork chops, sausages, chicken, lamb kidneys, beef steak, gammon, fried eggs, tomatoes and mushrooms, usually served with chips and peas
- South Africa, featuring boerewors, eggs, lamb chops, rump steak
- Arabian: Selection of shish kebabs, variously including chicken breast cubes, beef cubes, meat kofta, chicken kofta and lamb chops
- South Asia: Chicken tikka, spiced lamp chops, seekh kebab, fish pakoras, mutton tikka, and usually serve with sides including onions, rice, roti and chutney

== See also ==
- Kebab
- Skewer
