= Pinchitos =

Southern Spain skewered meat dish

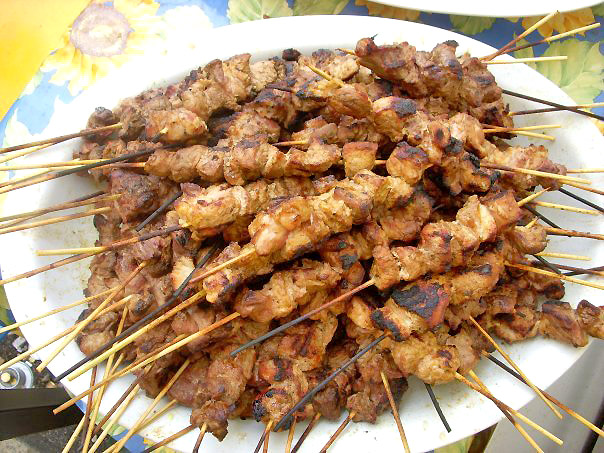
- Pinchos morunos ready to eat
- Alternative names: Pinchos morunos
- Course: Appetiser or main course
- Place of origin: Spain
- Serving temperature: Hot
- Main ingredients: Pork or chicken
- Variations: Beef or lamb

Pinchitos or pinchos morunos is a Moorish-derived food in Spanish cuisine, similar to kebab. The name pinchitos is used in the southern Spanish autonomous communities of Andalusia and Extremadura. They consist of small cubes of meat threaded onto a skewer (Spanish: pincho) which are traditionally cooked over charcoal braziers.

Similar dishes in North Africa or other Muslim majority countries tend to be lamb based, but pork and chicken are the most popular meats for the dish in Spain.

== In other countries ==
=== Puerto Rico ===
In Puerto Rico, they are called pinchos and they are so popular that they are almost considered a traditional dish. Unlike other countries, pinchos are made throughout the year. Pinchos are sold basically everywhere on the island of Puerto Rico, but mainly in food trucks or markets around the beach and the old town. Pinchos can be made with different kinds of meat (pork being the most famous one); however, they are also made with chicken and shark meat. They are always served with BBQ sauce and bread.

=== Venezuela ===
Pinchitos are also popular in Venezuela due to the heavy influence of Spain in Venezuelan cuisine. Pinchitos are one of the main dishes in Venezuelan barbecues, and are eaten almost during all year long. Besides lemon, bread, and wine (or beer, depending on the region), they are usually served with boiled yuca, or, in recent years, cherry tomatoes. Pinchitos are sold in street food carts all around the country, especially during weekends. In some regions, pinchitos are called "Pincho Americano" (American Brochette), which is also the name used for them in Honduras where they are also popular, but the recipe is the same.

== Ingredients and preparation ==
Pinchitos are usually made of lean diced pork or chicken, marinated with olive oil, and herbs and spices (such as garlic, cumin, thyme, paprika, oregano, turmeric and pepper) and seasoned with salt.

Pinchitos is one of the main meat dishes cooked at Andalusian and Extremaduran barbecues during the summer months. They are normally served with bread, wedges of lemon and wine.

== See also ==
- Anticuchos (Peru)
- Mixed grill
- Satay (Indonesia)
- Yakitori (Japan)
- Chuanr (China)
- Espetada (Portugal)
- Frigărui (Romania)
- Souvlaki (Greece)
- Sosatie (South Africa)
- Suya (Nigeria)
- Khorovats (Armenia)
- List of chicken dishes
