= Canapé =

Hors d'œuvre

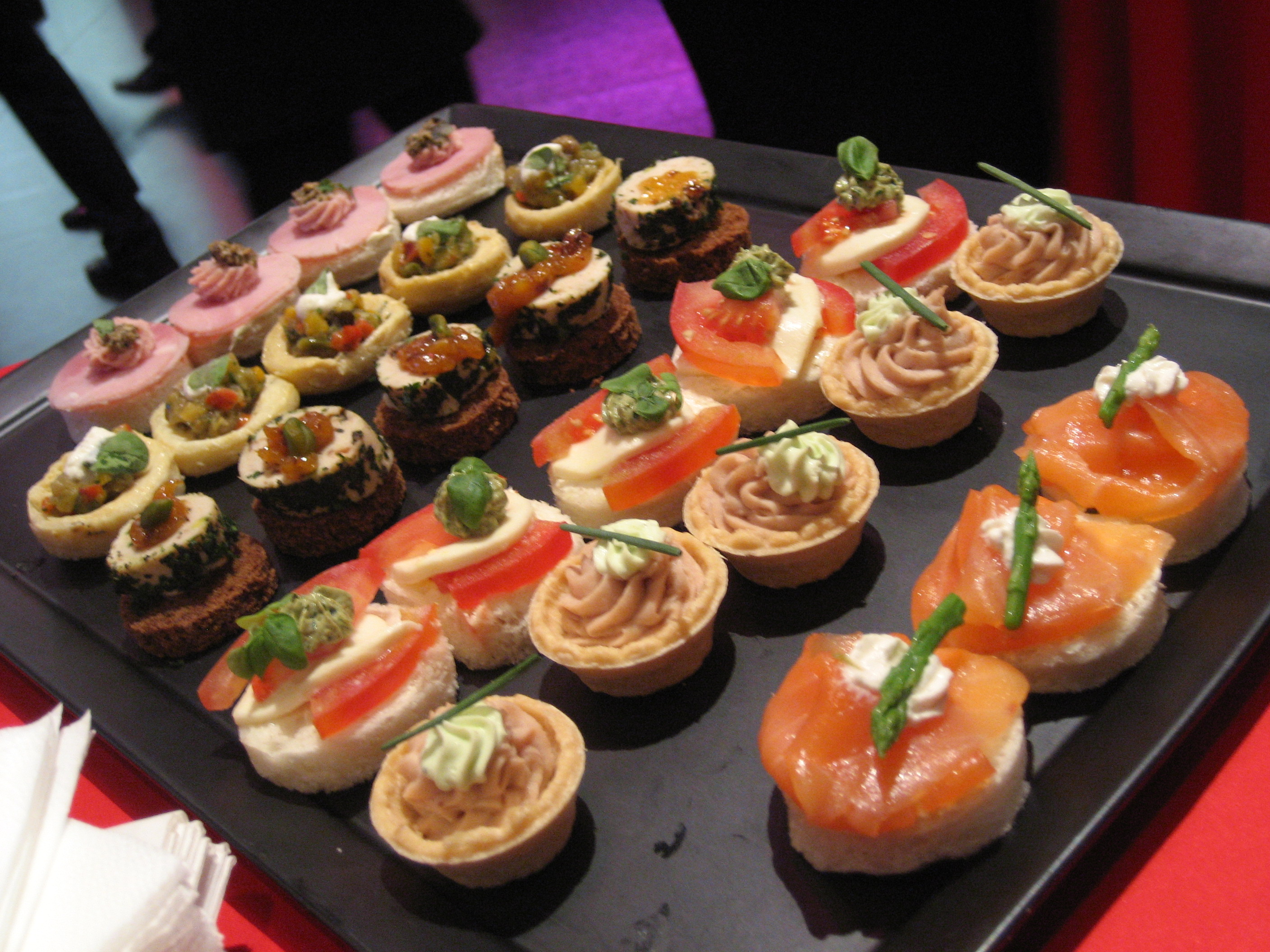
- Tray of canapés
- Course: Hors d'oeuvres
- Place of origin: France
- Main ingredients: Base: one of crackers, bread, toast or puff pastry Topping: savoury butters, spreads, or pastes
- Variations: Amuse-bouche, vol-au-vent

A canapé (French: [kanape]) is a type of starter, a small, prepared, and often decorative food, consisting of a small piece of bread (sometimes toasted) or cracker, wrapped or topped with some savoury food, held in the fingers and often eaten in one bite.

== Name ==
The name comes from the French word for sofa, drawing on the analogy that the garnish sits atop the bread as people do on a sofa.

== Details ==
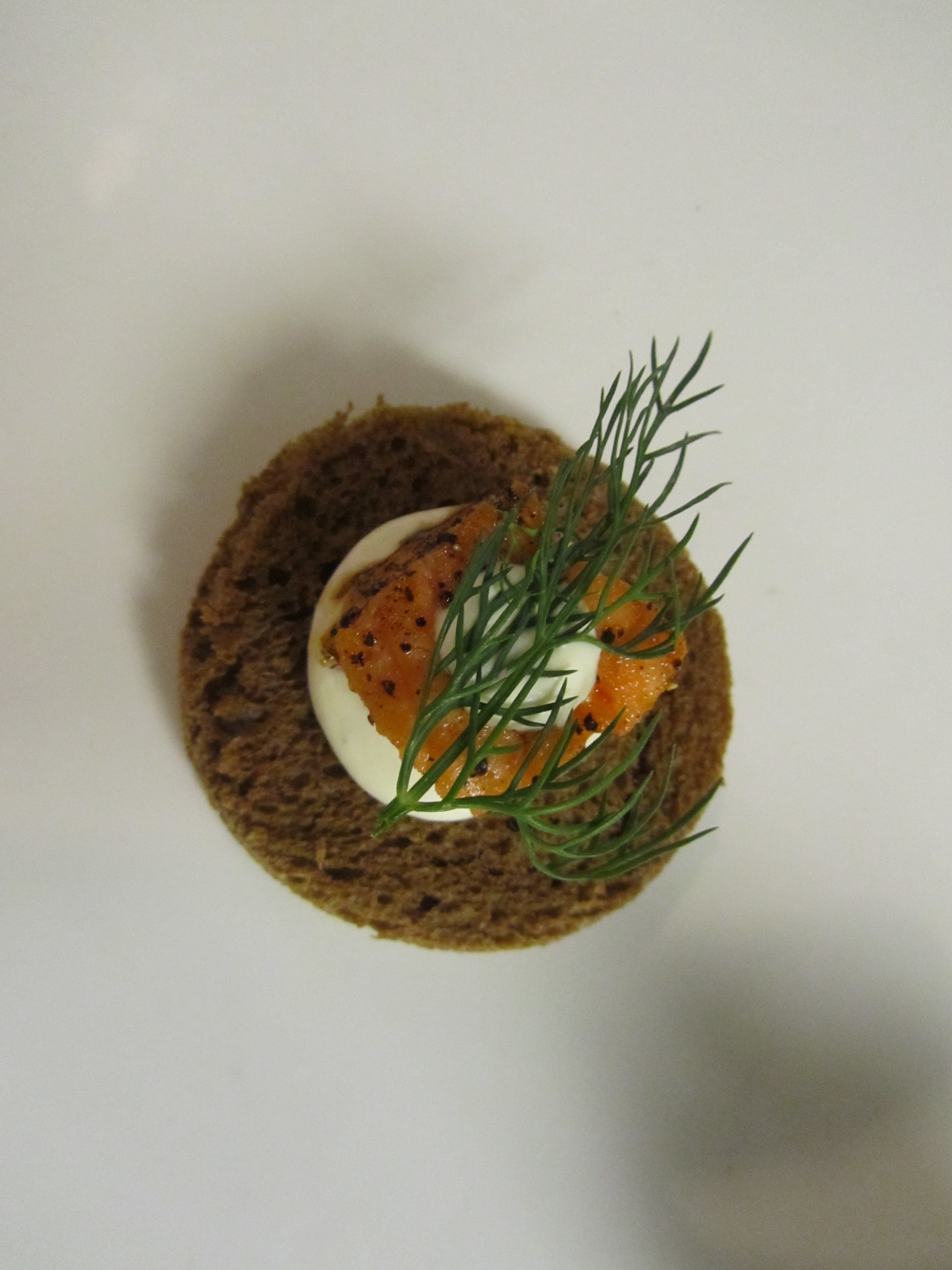
Wild salmon canapé

Because they are often served during cocktail hours, it is often desired that a canapé be either salty or spicy, in order to encourage guests to drink more.

A canapé may also be referred to as finger food, although not all finger foods are canapés. Crackers, small slices of bread or toast, or puff pastry are cut into various shapes, used as the base for savory butters or pastes, and often topped with other savory foods such as meat, cheese, fish, caviar, foie gras, purées or relish.

Traditionally, canapés are built on stale bread (although other foods such as puff pastry, crackers, or fresh vegetables may be used as a base) cut in thin slices and then shaped with a cutter or knife into circles, rings, squares, strips or triangles. These are then deep fried, sautéed, or toasted, then topped or piped with highly processed and decoratively applied items. Colorful and eye-pleasing garnishes often complete the presentation.

The canapés are usually served on a canapé salver and eaten from small canapé plates.

== Composition ==
The composition of a canapé consists of a base (e.g., the bread or pancake), a spread, a main item, and a garnish.

The spread is traditionally either a compound butter, made by creaming butter with other ingredients such as ham or lobster, or a flavored cream cheese. Mayonnaise salads can also be prepared as spreads.

Common garnishes can range from finely chopped vegetables, scallions, herbs,caviar and truffle oil.

According to Lowney's Cook Book (1912):

Canapés are made from white, graham, and brown bread, sliced very thin and cut in various shapes. They may be dipped in melted butter, toasted or fried.

They could be served hot or cold; spread with anchovy, crab, or caviar paste; or served with garnishes like green and red peppers, paprika, and lemon juice.

Bread triangles can be sautéed in bacon fat, deep fried, or just buttered and browned in the oven.

Mustard can be use as a spread for canapés garnished with chopped bacon, grated cheese, or chopped olives.

== See also ==
- Amuse-bouche
- Antipasto
- Hors d'œuvre
- List of hors d'oeuvre
- Meze
- Tapas
- Tea sandwich
- Vol-au-vent
- Zakuski
