= Cucumber sauce =

Sauce in English cuisine

Cucumber sauce is a type of sauce in English cuisine that can be made in several different varieties, both hot and cold.

Eliza Acton gives several recipes in Modern Cookery for Private Families. The first is for a "common cucumber sauce" is made by frying flour coated cucumber slices in butter until browned, optionally with onions, and making a sauce with brown gravy or beef broth. Another version is made similar to gravy by stewing in butter until softened, seasoned with white pepper and stirred with flour and mixed parsley. Like many sauces, these can be finished with vinegar. There are three versions of "White cucumber sauce" in Modern Cookery. One is made by boiling cucumbers and mixing with béchamel, another by stewing in butter and boiling in cream-thickened pale veal gravy. Alternately, the cucumbers can be boiled in seasoned veal gravy and mixed with egg yolks and an acidic ingredient like chili flavored vinegar or lemon juice to finish.

In The Jewish Manual by Lady Judith Montefiore there are recipes for brown cucumber sauce, in addition to the white sauce. The white sauce is made by softening cucumbers in vinegar and water, simmering the softened cucumbers in seasoned veal broth and thickening the gravy with egg yolks before serving. The brown cucumber sauce is made by frying the cucumbers, and optionally onions, in fat, then adding beef gravy, seasoning and finishing with vinegar.

In The Complete Cook (1908) cold cucumber sauce is made with béchamel sauce, cream mayonnaise and green coloring. The hot version is similar, but without mayonnaise.

== See also ==
- Victorian cuisine
- List of sauces
- Tzatziki
