= Gravy =

Sauce made from the juices of meats

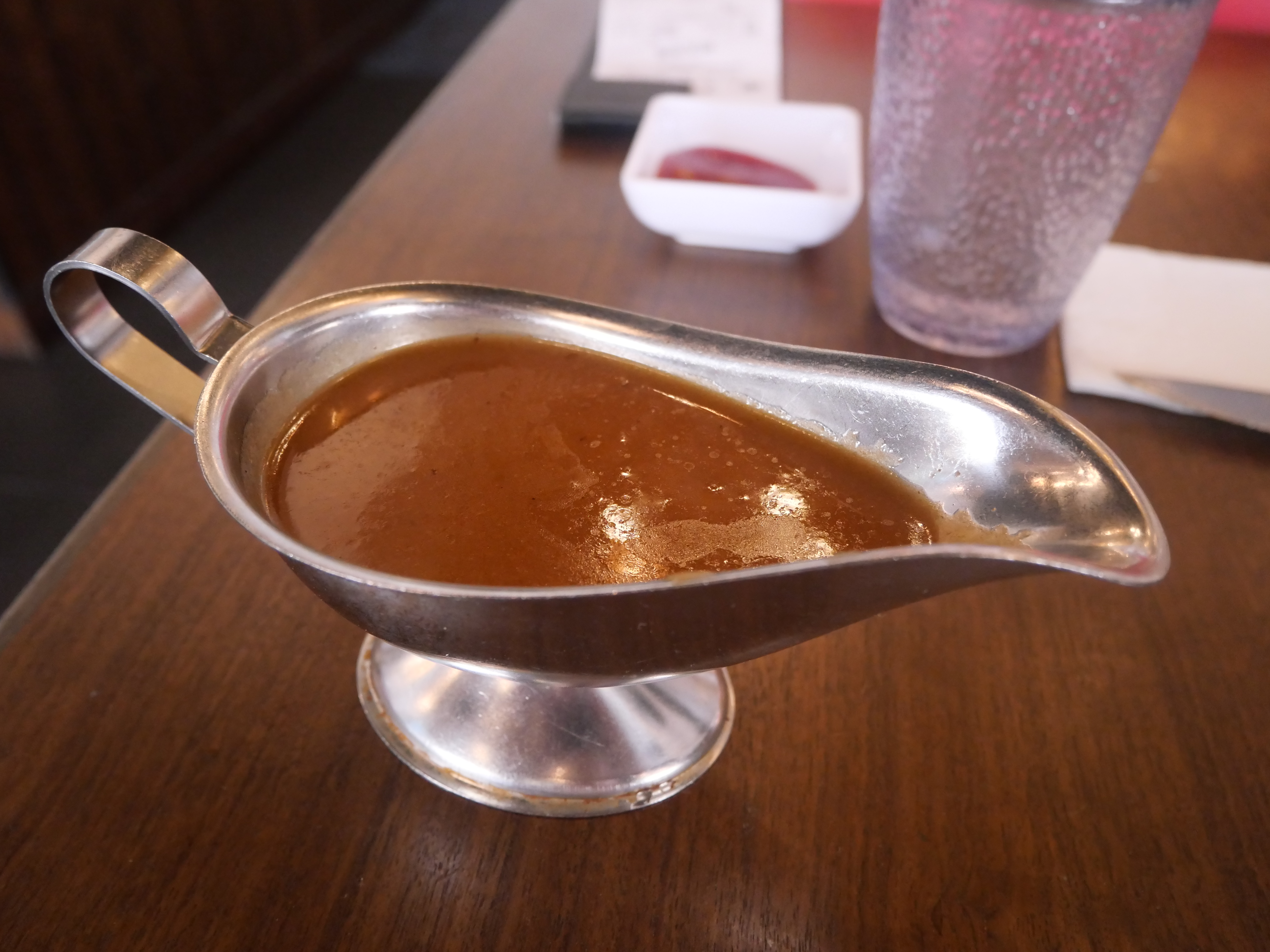
- Brown gravy, served in a sauce boat
- Course: Sauce
- Place of origin: United Kingdom
- Main ingredients: Juices of meats and vegetables, thickeners, gravy salt, gravy browning, bouillon cubes

Gravy is a sauce made from the juices of meats and vegetables that run naturally during cooking and often thickened with thickeners for added texture. The gravy may be further coloured and flavoured with gravy salt (a mix of salt and caramel food colouring), gravy browning (gravy salt dissolved in water), or bouillon cubes. Powders can be used as a substitute for natural meat or vegetable extracts. Canned and instant gravies are also available. Gravy is commonly served with roasts, meatloaf, sandwiches, rice, noodles, fries (chips), mashed potatoes, or biscuits (North America; see biscuits and gravy).

== History ==
One of the earliest recorded mentions of gravy is in a 14th-century English recipe book, The Forme of Cury. The term gravy originates from the Old French word for meat or fish bouillon, which in fourteenth century French manuscripts was "gravé" or "grané". It is suggested that the French word grané is associated with grain, connecting grain's usage in culinary terms as a sauce made from meat and served with meat.

=== Popularisation in different cultures ===
The long history of English immigration to North America has influenced food production and consumption in Canada and the United States. In North America, gravy is considered a popular sauce to accompany traditional Thanksgiving and Christmas celebrations and food, such as turkey and potatoes.

In the Southern United States, gravy and biscuits are popular breakfast foods that originated in Southern Appalachia in the late 1800s. While the South has developed various types of gravy, most contain sausage, flour, butter, and milk, which are affordable ingredients for working-class families.

Gravy is one of three ingredients in the French-Canadian dish poutine, made up of French fries, cheese curds, and a salty, light brown sauce combining beef and chicken stock. Poutine emerged in rural Québec in the 1950s and has become one of Canada's most iconic meals.

=== Instant gravy ===
The first instant gravy was developed by the British company Bisto in 1908, as a meat-flavoured powder that can be combined with water and served with meat. Instant gravy is now sold by various companies, including Heinz, Knorr, and McCormick.

== Types ==
See also Wiktionary > gravy § Hyponyms

- Brown gravy is the name for a gravy made from the drippings from roasted meat or fowl. The drippings are cooked on the stovetop at high heat with onions or other vegetables, and then thickened with a thin mixture of water and either wheat flour or cornstarch.
- Cream gravy, or white gravy (sawmill gravy), is a bechamel sauce made using fats from meat—such as sausage or bacon—or meat drippings from roasting or frying meats. The fat and drippings are combined with flour to make a roux, and milk is typically used as the liquid to create the sauce; however, cream is often added or may be the primary liquid. It is frequently seasoned with black pepper, and complementing herbs and bits of meat may be added such as sausage or diced chicken liver. It is an important part of many Southern U.S. meals, and frequently used as an ingredient in casseroles and other Southern dishes such as biscuits and gravy and served alongside other regional dishes including mashed potatoes, fried chicken and chicken-fried steak. Other common names include country gravy, sawmill gravy, milk gravy, and sausage gravy.
- Egg gravy is a variety of gravy made starting with meat drippings (usually from bacon) followed by flour being used to make a thick roux. Water, broth, or milk is added and the liquid is brought back up to a boil, then salted and peppered to taste. A well-beaten egg is then slowly added while the gravy is stirred or whisked swiftly, cooking the egg immediately and separating it into small fragments in the gravy.
- Red gravy can refer to several different dishes. It is a simple, basic tomato sauce in New Orleans. In some Italian-American communities it refers to a complex long- and slow-cooked tomato sauce, frequently with meats and vegetables, although the distinction between "sauce" and "gravy" in the Italian-American tomato world is debated. There are several red gravies from India, which are variations of tomato-based curry.
- Giblet gravy has the giblets of turkey or chicken added when it is to be served with those types of poultry, or uses stock made from the giblets.
- Mushroom gravy is a variety of gravy made with mushrooms.
- Onion gravy is made from large quantities of slowly sweated, chopped onions mixed with stock or wine. It is commonly served with bangers and mash, eggs, chops, or other grilled or fried meat which by way of the cooking method would not produce their own gravy.
- Red-eye gravy is a gravy made from the drippings of ham fried in a skillet or frying pan. The pan is deglazed with coffee, giving the gravy its name, and uses no thickening agent. This gravy is a staple of Southern United States cuisine and is usually served over ham, grits or biscuits.
- Vegetable gravy or vegetarian gravy is gravy made with boiled or roasted vegetables. A quick and flavourful vegetable gravy can be made from any combination of vegetable broth or vegetable stock, flour, and one of either butter, oil, or margarine. One recipe uses vegetarian bouillon cubes with cornstarch (corn flour) as a thickener ("cowboy roux"), which is whisked into boiling water. Sometimes vegetable juices are added to enrich the flavour, which may give the gravy a dark green colour. Wine could be added. Brown vegetarian gravy can also be made with savoury yeast extract like Marmite or Vegemite. There are also commercially produced instant gravy granules which are suitable for both vegetarians and vegans, though some of the leading brands are not marketed as being vegetarian.

== Cuisines ==
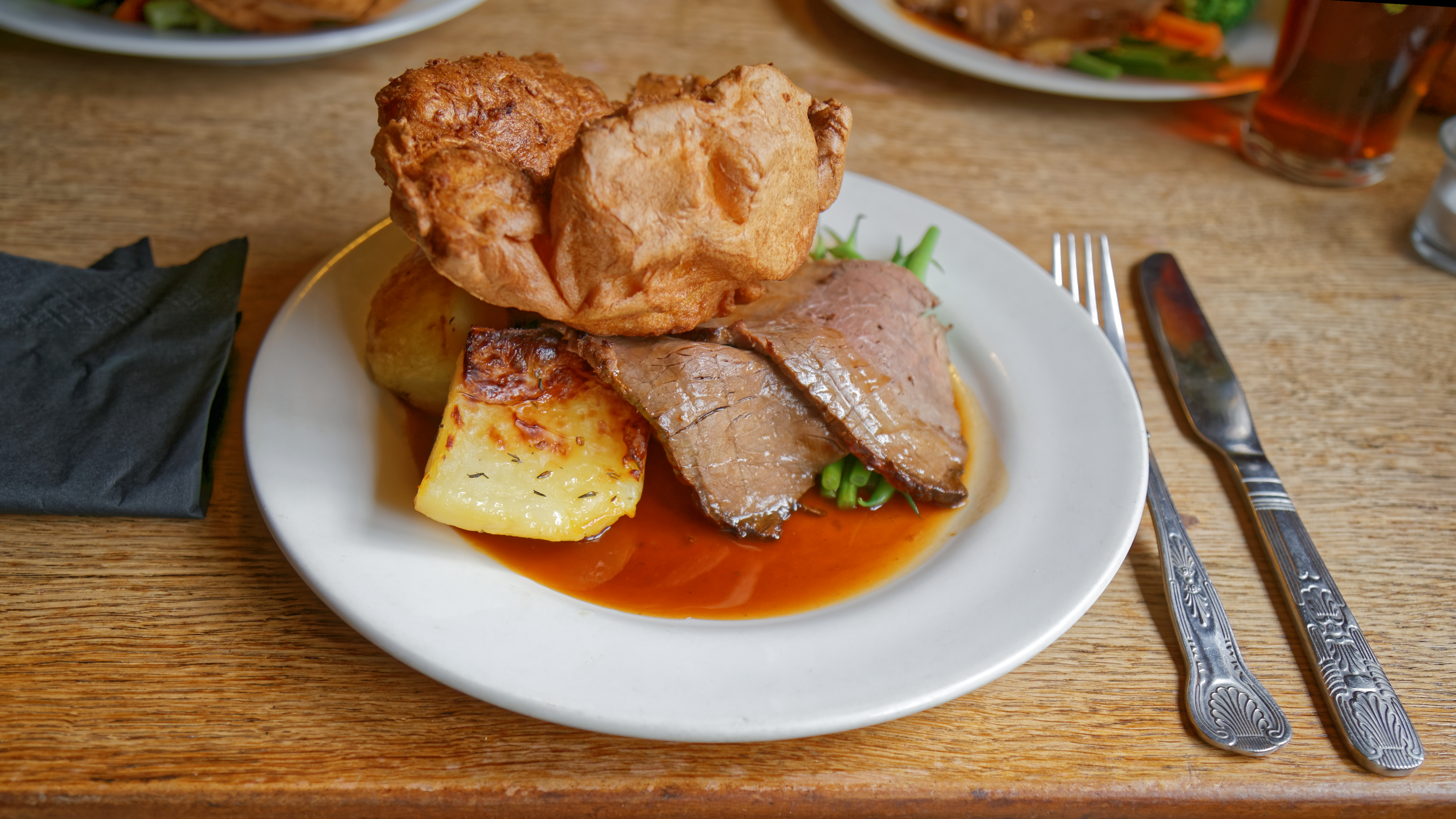
A Sunday roast served on a bed of gravy

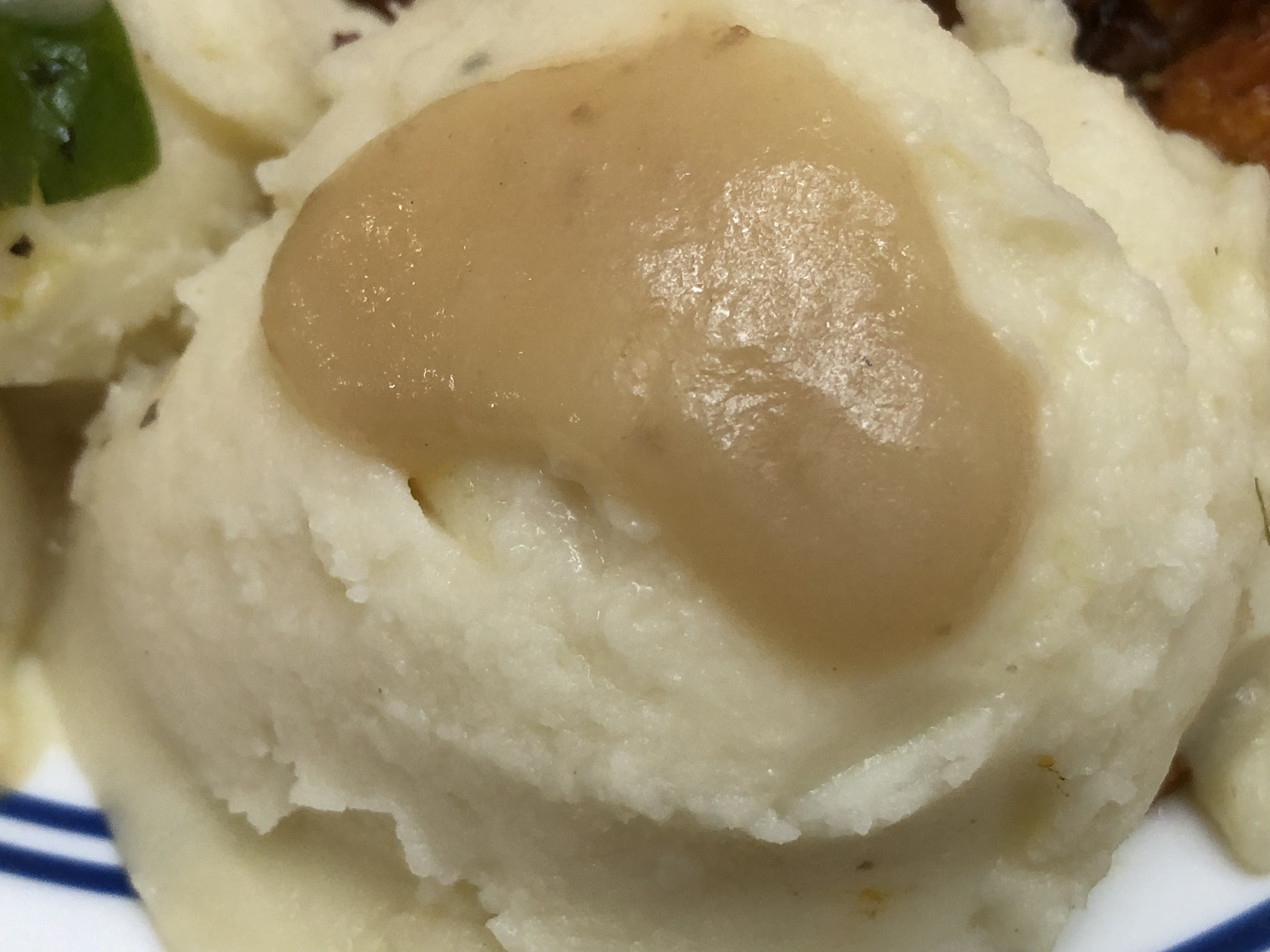
Mashed potatoes and gravy from an American supermarket

In the United Kingdom and Ireland, a Sunday roast is usually served with gravy. It is commonly eaten with beef, pork, chicken, or lamb. It is also popular in different parts of England, Scotland, Wales and Ireland to have gravy with just chips (mostly from a fish and chip shop or Chinese takeaway).

In British and Irish cuisine, as well as in the cuisines of Commonwealth countries like Australia, Canada, and New Zealand, the word gravy usually refers to the meat-based sauce derived from meat juices, stock cubes or gravy granules but also is used for vegetable gravies. Use of the word "gravy" does not include other thickened sauces. One of the most popular forms is onion gravy, which is eaten with sausages, Yorkshire pudding, and roast meat.

Throughout the United States, gravy is commonly eaten with Thanksgiving foods such as turkey, mashed potatoes, and stuffing. One Southern United States variation is sausage gravy eaten with American biscuits. Another Southern US dish that uses white gravy is chicken-fried steak. Rice and gravy is a staple of Cajun and Creole cuisine in the southern US state of Louisiana.

Gravy is a key ingredient in the Canadian dish poutine which is a combination of french fries, gravy, and cheese curds. The dish emerged in Quebec and is associated with the province's identity.

In some parts of Asia, particularly India, gravy is any thickened liquid part of a dish. For example, the liquid part of a thick curry may be referred to as gravy.

In the Mediterranean, Maghreb cuisine is dominated by gravy and bread-based dishes. Tajine and most other Maghreb (Morocco, Algeria and Tunisia) dishes are derivatives of oil, meat, and vegetable gravies. These dishes are usually served with a loaf of bread. The bread is then dipped into the gravy and then used to gather or scoop the meat and vegetables between the index, middle finger and thumb, and consumed.

In Menorca, due to English influence since the 17th century, gravy has been used in typical Menorcan and Catalan dishes, as for example macarrons amb grevi (pasta).

== See also ==
- Au jus – beef juice
- Cuisine of the Southern United States
- Gravy train (disambiguation)
- List of sauces
- Sauce boat, also referred to as a gravy boat
