= List of onion dishes =

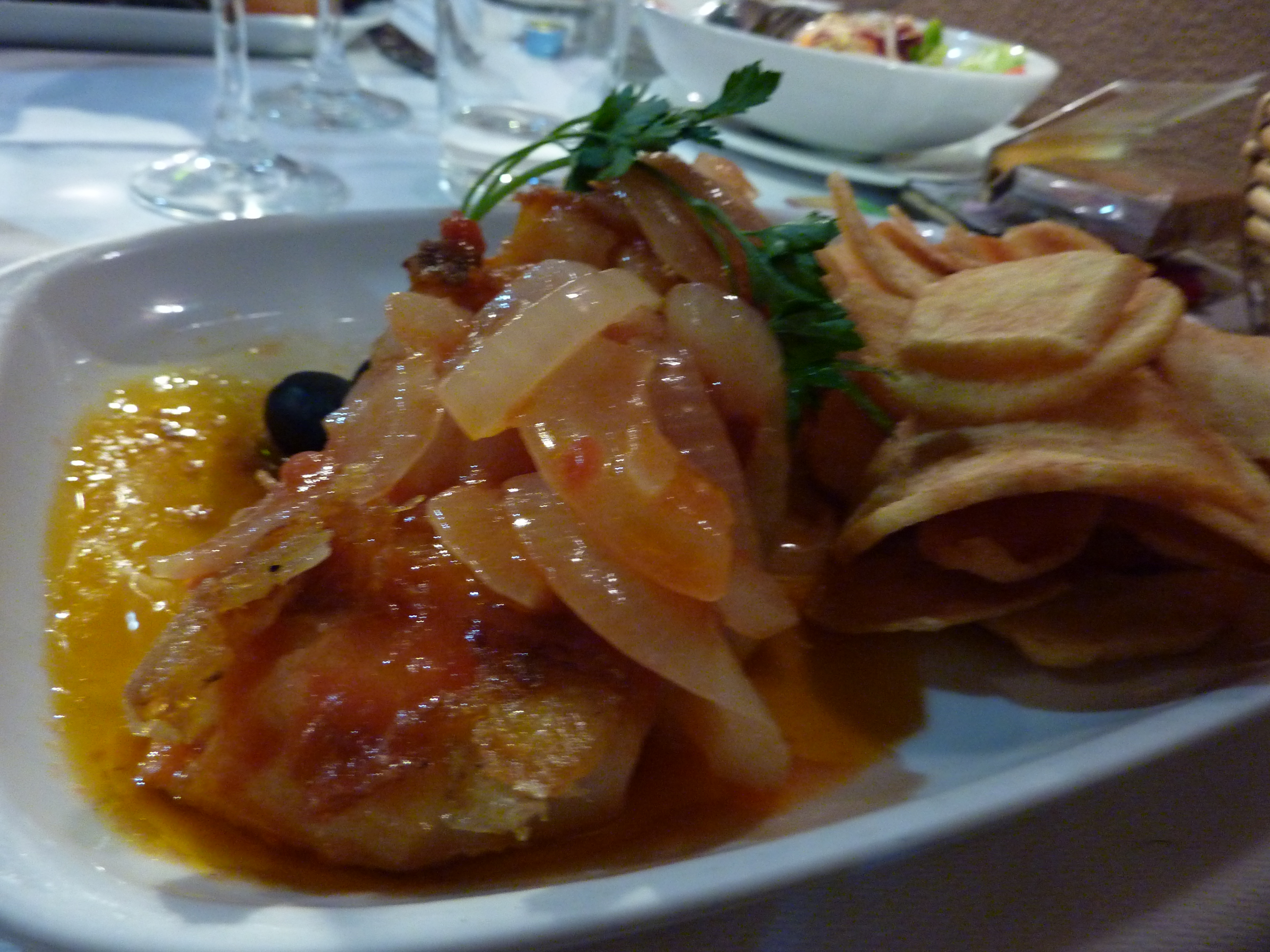
Cebolada

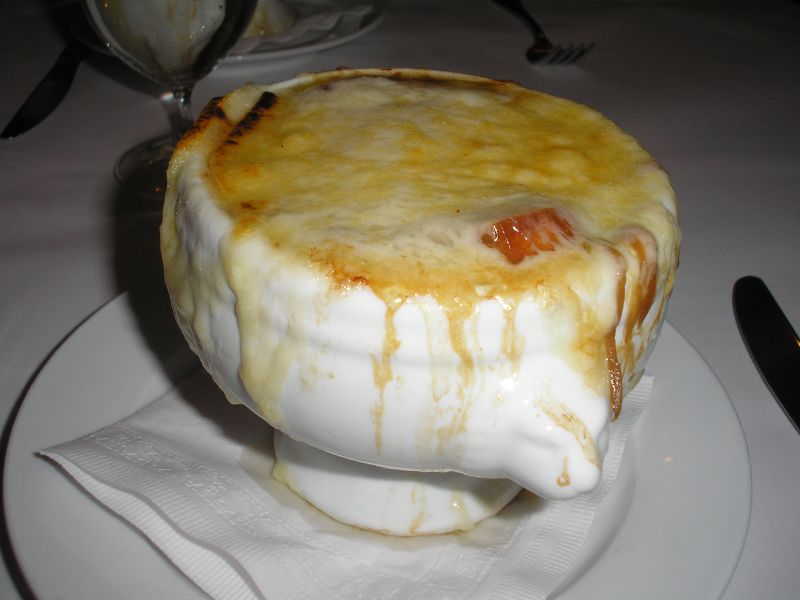
A bowl of French onion soup with melted cheese atop

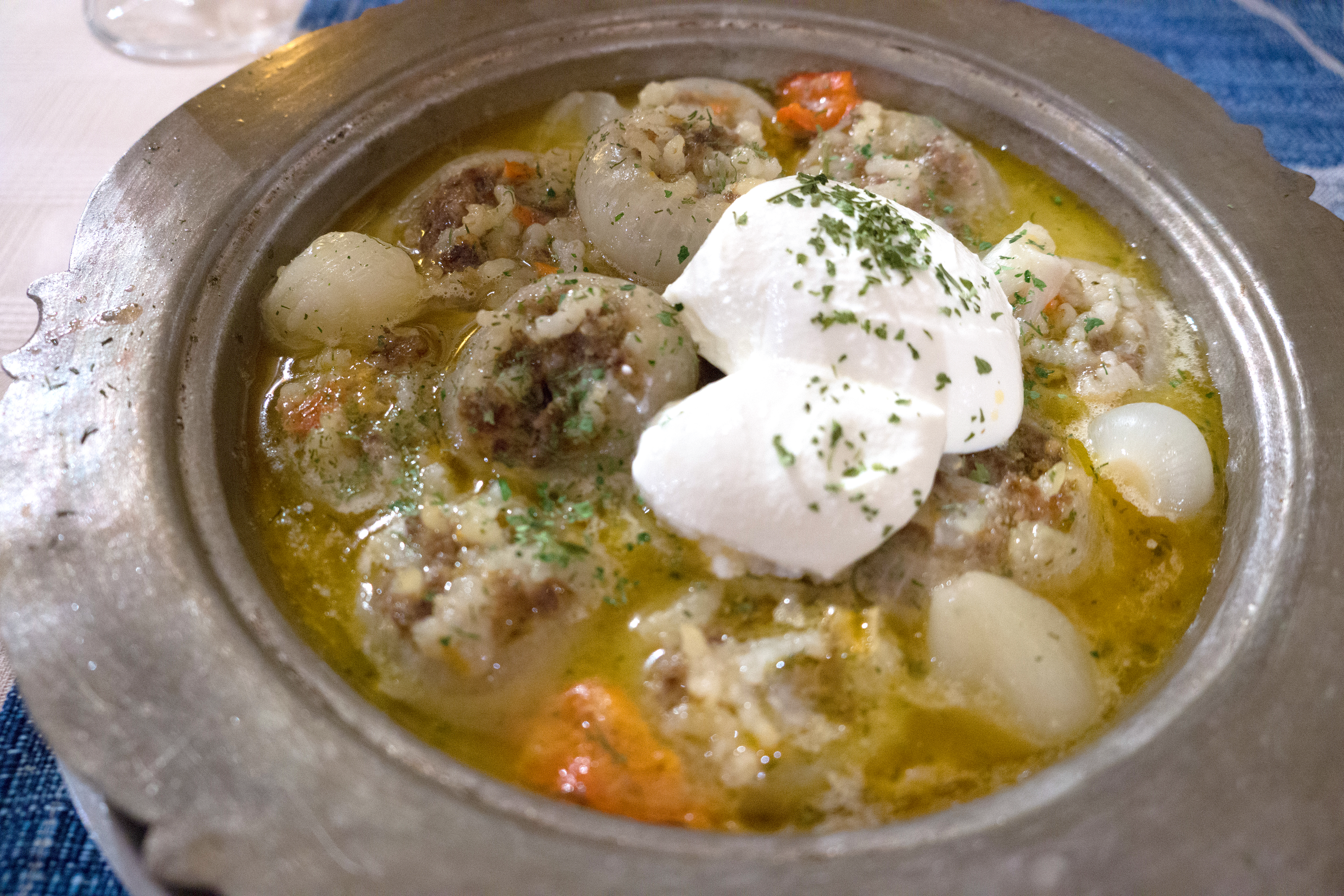
Sogan-dolma

This list consists of notable dishes and foods in which onion is used as a primary ingredient. Onions are widely used in cooking. They are very versatile and can be baked, boiled, braised, grilled, fried, roasted, sautéed or eaten raw.

== Onion dishes ==
- Blooming onion – Culinary dish – consists of one large onion which is cut to resemble a flower, which is then battered and deep-fried
- Cebolada
- Champ – Irish potato dish
- Cocktail onion – Pearl onion pickled in a brine
- Creamed onion
- Dopiaza – Persian curry dish
- Encebollado – Ecuadorian fish stew
- French onion soup – Soup of onions and stock
- Fried onion – Method of cooking onions
- Fugazza – Argentine pizza variety – is a common type of Argentine pizza, originating in Buenos Aires, that consists of a thick pizza crust topped with onions, cheese, and sometimes olives.
- Kachumbari – Tomato-onion salad
- Liver and onions – Prepared dish
- Mujaddara – Dish of lentils, rice and sautéed onions
- Musakhan – Palestinian bread and chicken dish
- Onion Boil
- Onion bhaji – Deep-fried fritters served as fast food in India, Pakistan and the Caribbean
- Onion cake – Cake made with onion
- Onion chip – Deep-fried battered onion slices
- Onion gravy – Type of sauce
- Onion powder – Dried ground onion used as a seasoning
- Onion ring – Deep-fried battered onion slices
- Onion sauce – Culinary sauce made with onions
- Pa-kimchi – Variant of the Korean dish kimchi
- Pickled onion – Onions pickled in a solution of vinegar or salt
- Pissaladière – Flat bread topped with onions, anchovies and olives
- Scallion pancake
  - Cong you bing – Chinese savory flatbread
  - Pajeon – Korean pan-fried scallion dish
- Seeni sambol – Sri Lankan condiment
- Skirlie – Scottish dish
- Sogan-dolma – Stuffed dishes in Middle Eastern cuisine
- Tarte Flambée – Topped flatbread from Alsace and Germany
- Yassa – Senegalese spicy marinated poultry or fish dish
- Zwiebelkuchen – German onion cake
Onion dishes

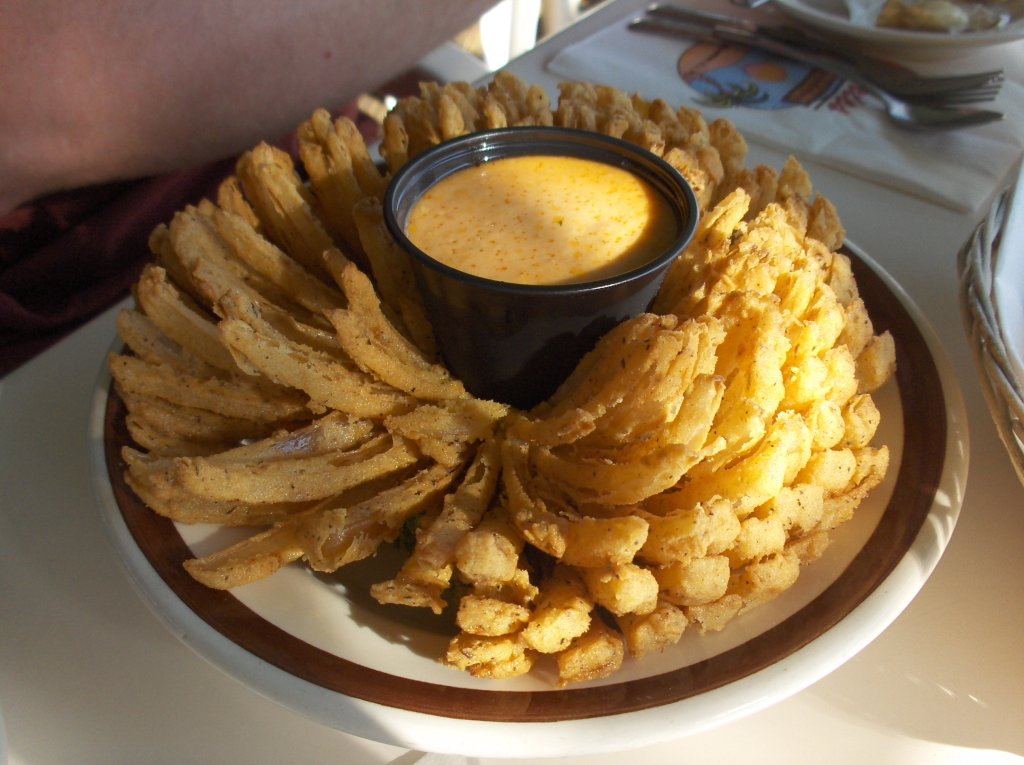
A blooming onion with dipping sauce

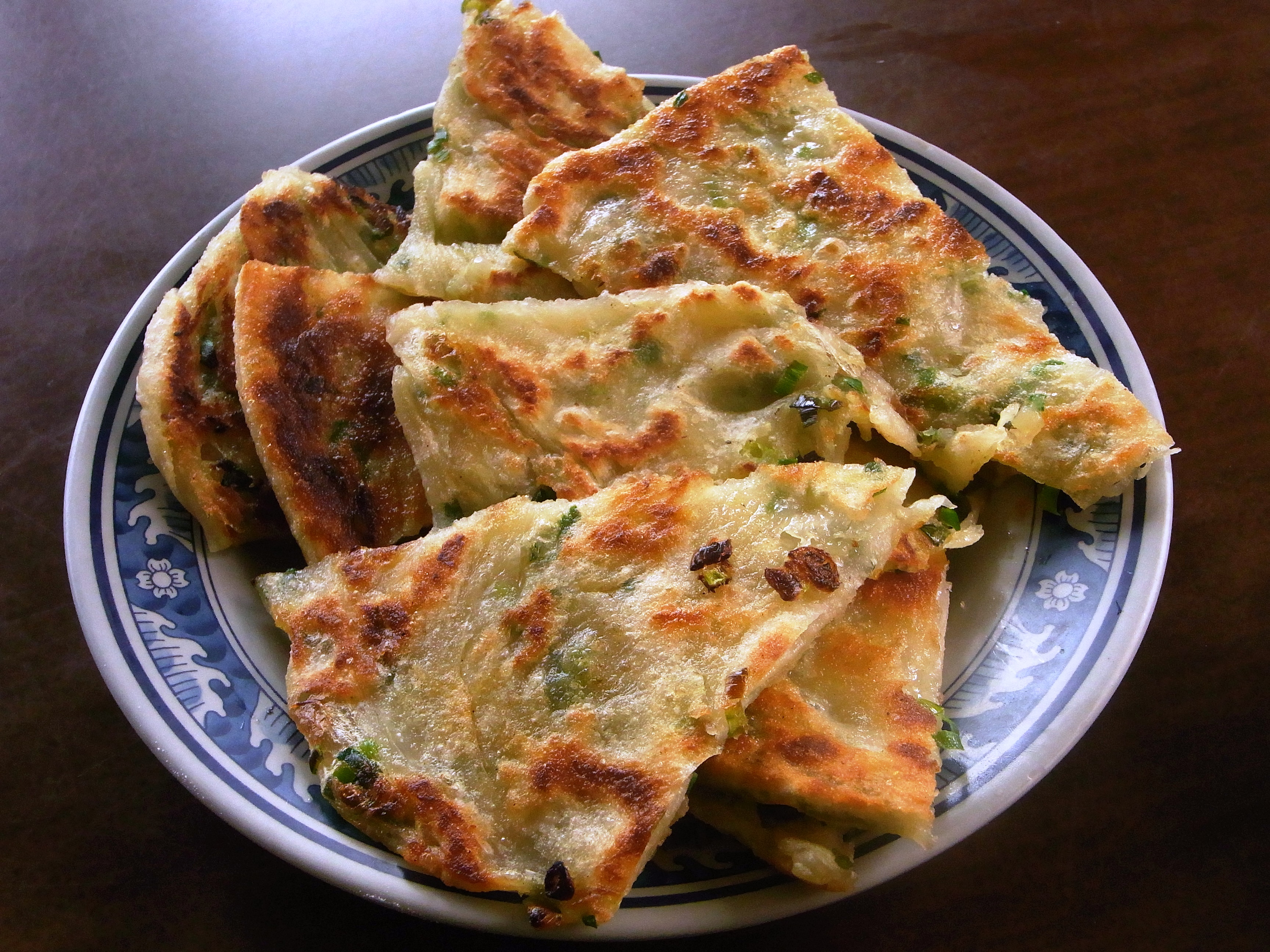
Cong you bing

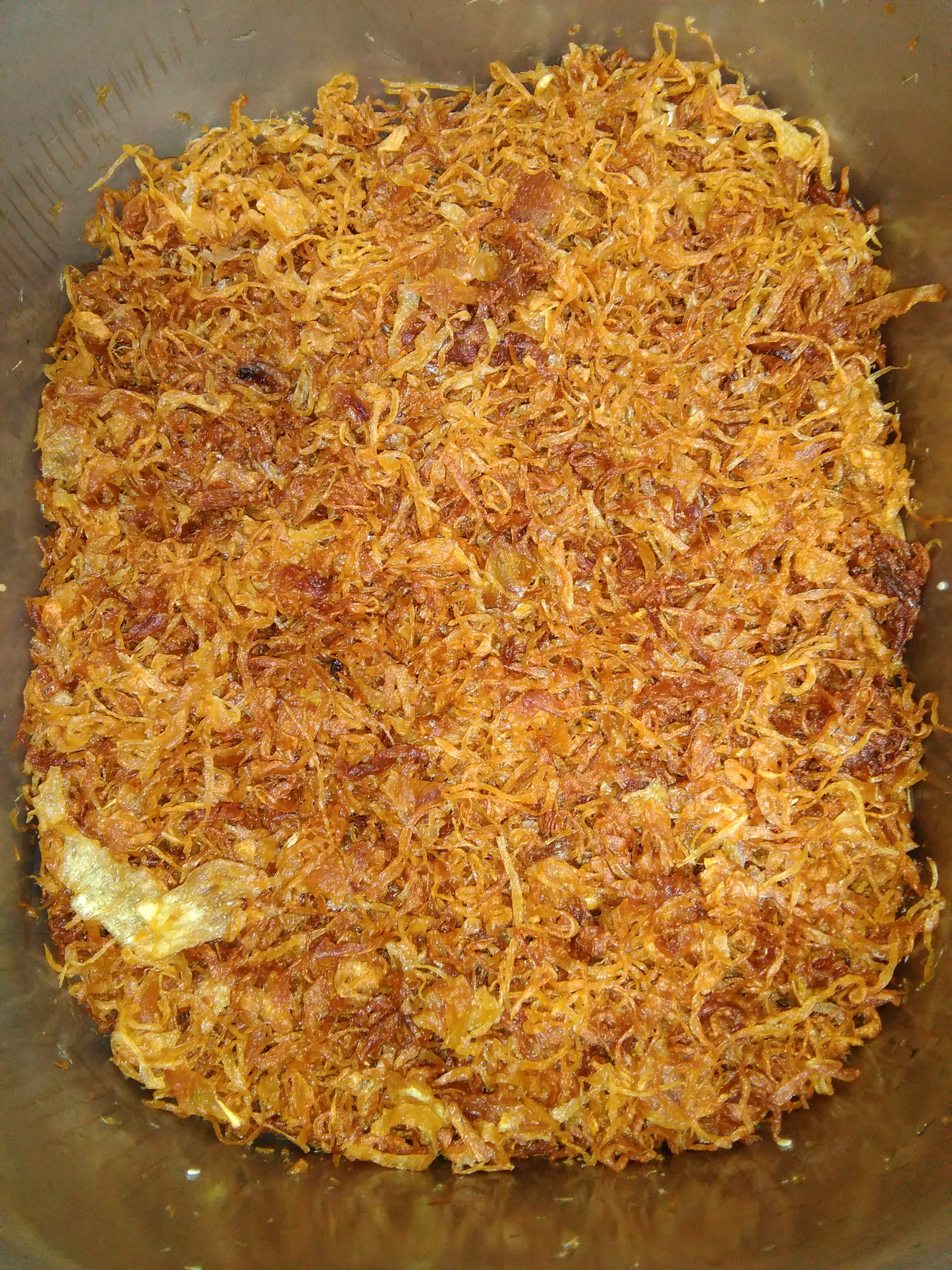
Fried onions in Iran

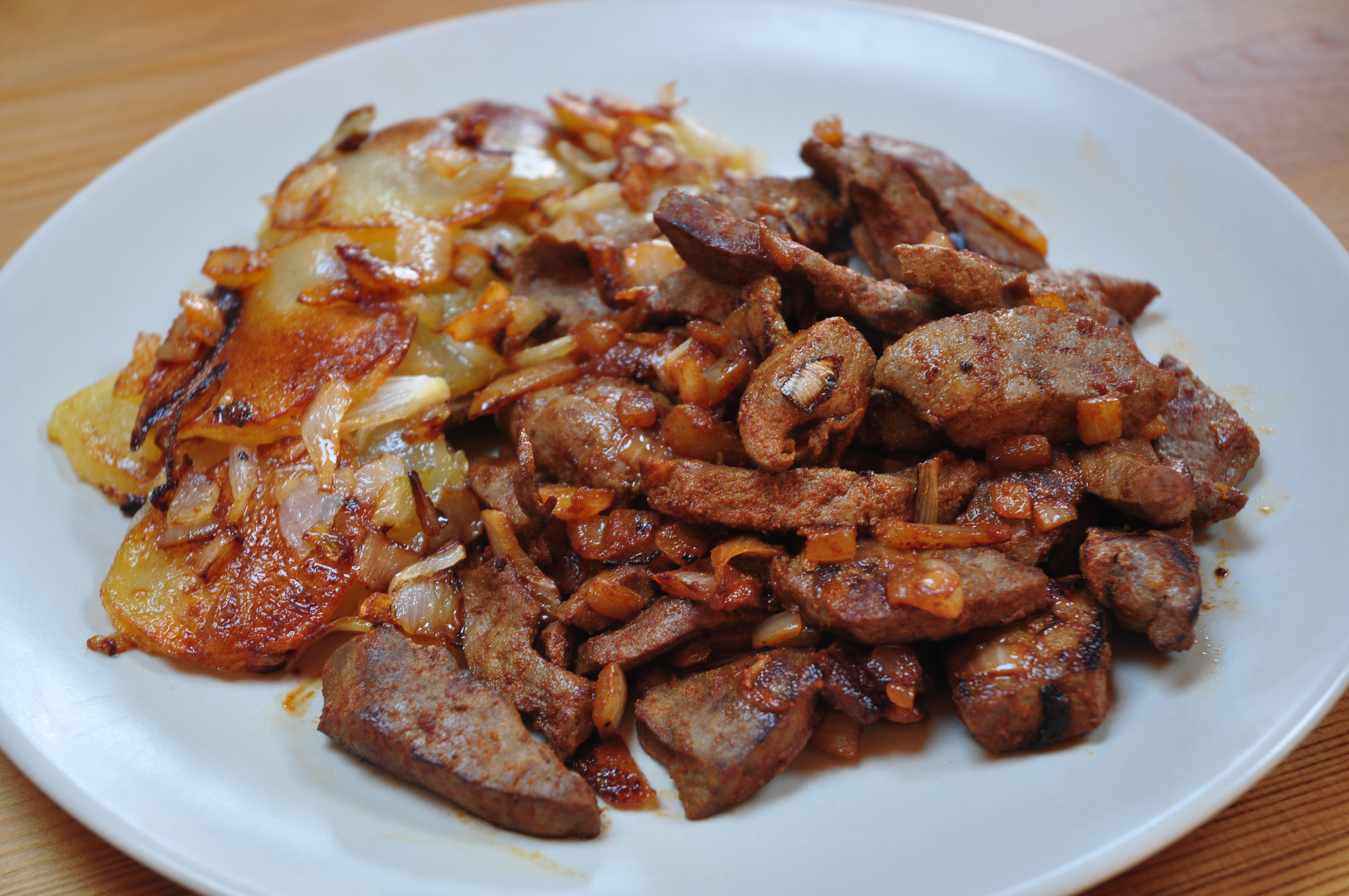
Liver and onions

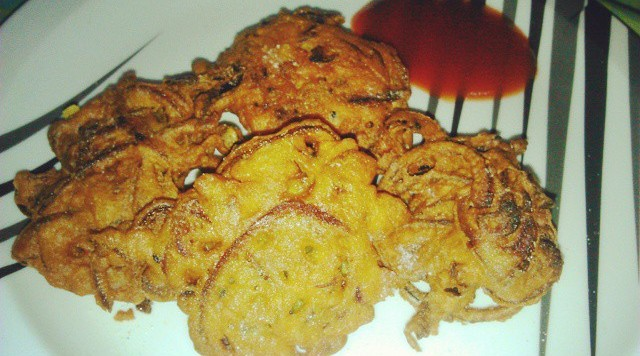
Onion fritters (Peyaji) are a Bengali dish made with onions

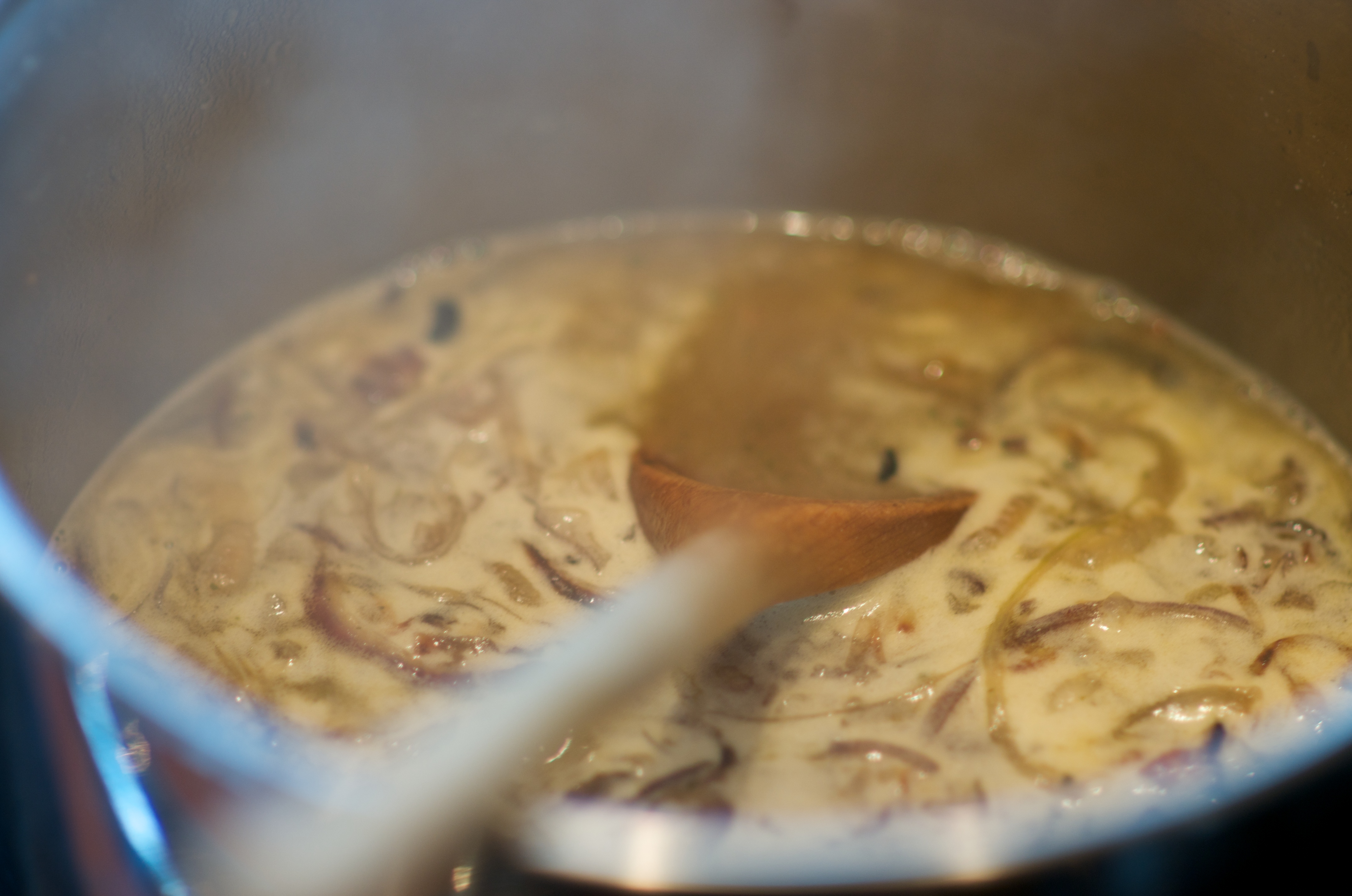
Roasted onion gravy

== See also ==
- List of foods
- List of garlic dishes
- List of mushroom dishes
- List of vegetable dishes
