= Yorkshire pudding =

Traditional English side dish

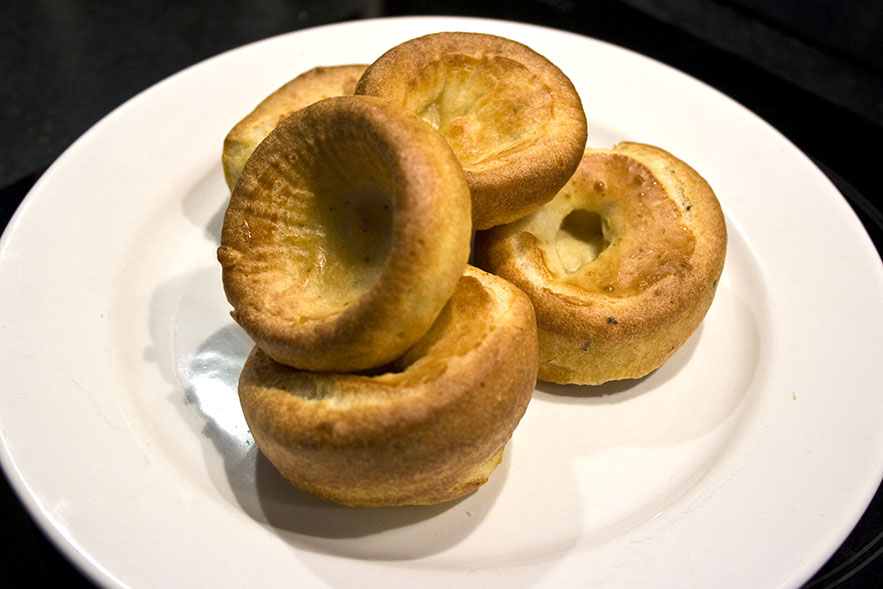
- A plate of Yorkshire puddings
- Alternative names: Yorkshire
- Type: Pudding
- Place of origin: United Kingdom
- Region or state: Northern England
- Main ingredients: Milk or water, flour and eggs

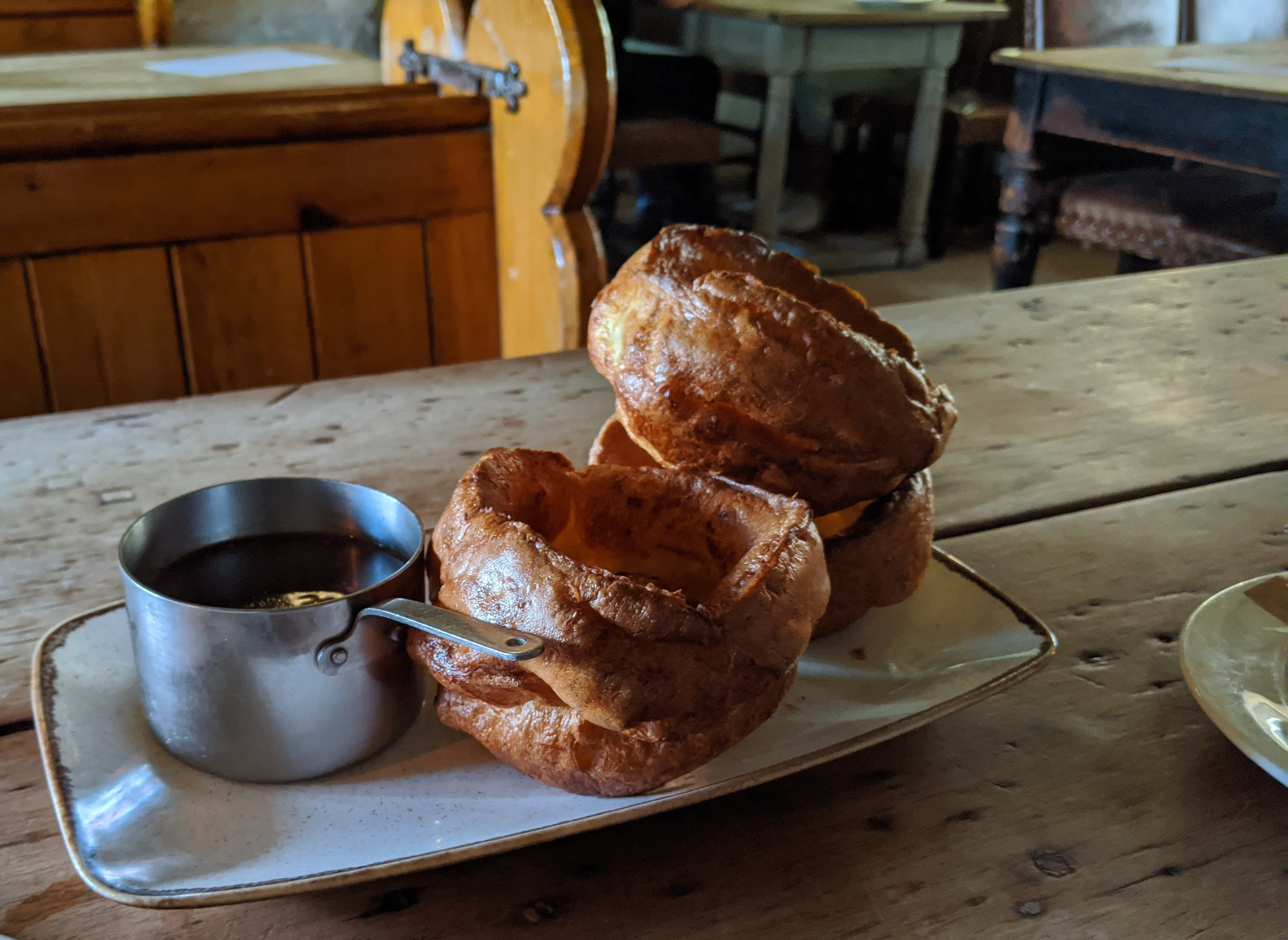
Yorkshire puddings

Yorkshire pudding is a baked pudding made from a batter of eggs, flour, and milk or water. A common British side dish, it is a versatile food that can be served in numerous ways depending on its ingredients, size, and the accompanying components of the meal. As a first course, it can be served with onion gravy. For a main course, it may be served with meat and gravy (historically roast beef but in recent years with other meats), as part of the traditional Sunday roast, but can also be filled with foods such as bangers and mash to make a meal. Sausages can be added to make toad in the hole. In some parts of the United Kingdom (especially the Midlands), the Yorkshire pudding can be eaten as a dessert, with a sweet sauce. The 18th century cookery writer Hannah Glasse was the first to use the term "Yorkshire pudding" in print.

Yorkshire puddings are similar to Dutch baby pancakes, and to popovers, an American light roll made from an egg batter.

== History ==
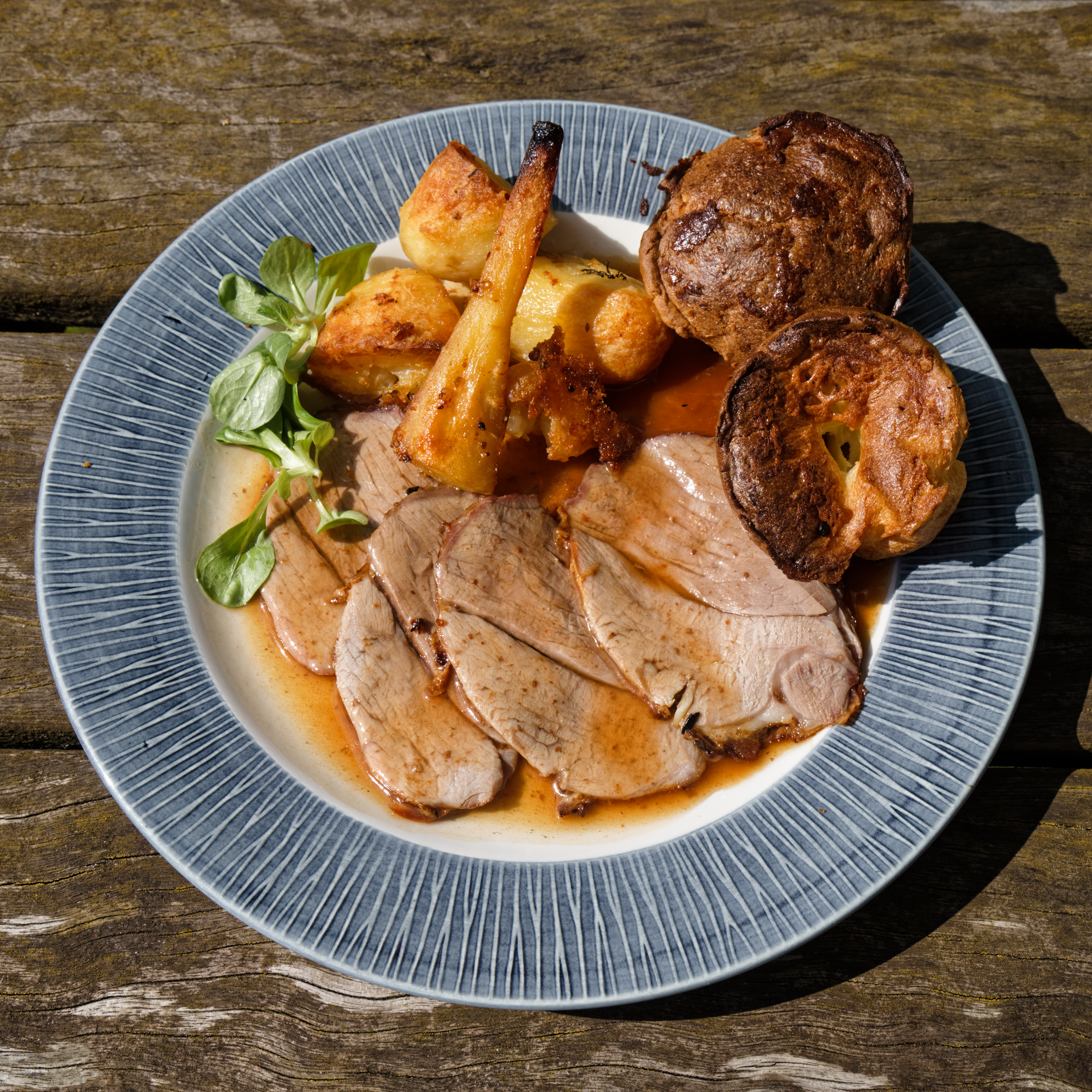
Yorkshire puddings served as part of a Sunday roast

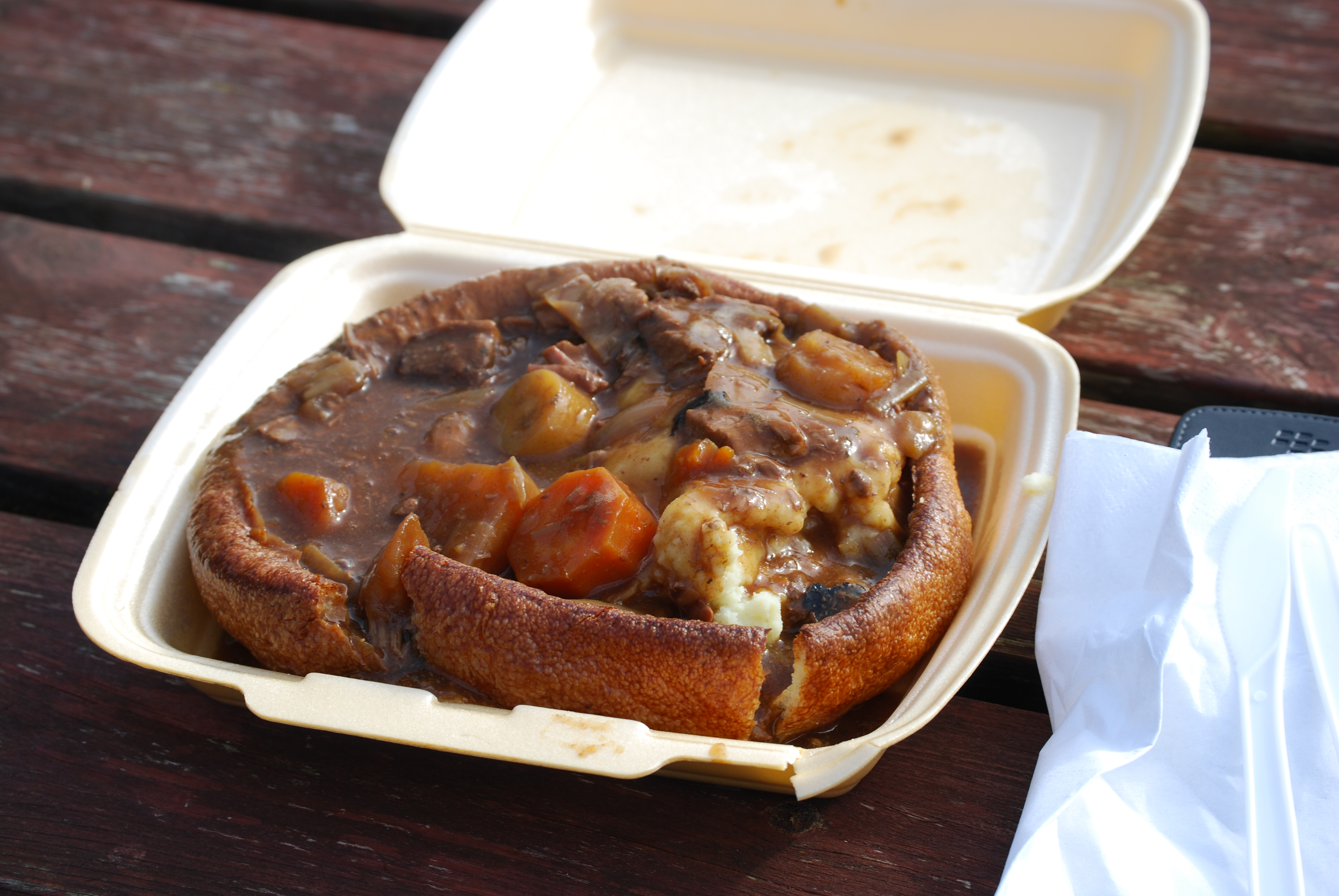
A Yorkshire pudding filled with mashed potato, beef, gravy and vegetables

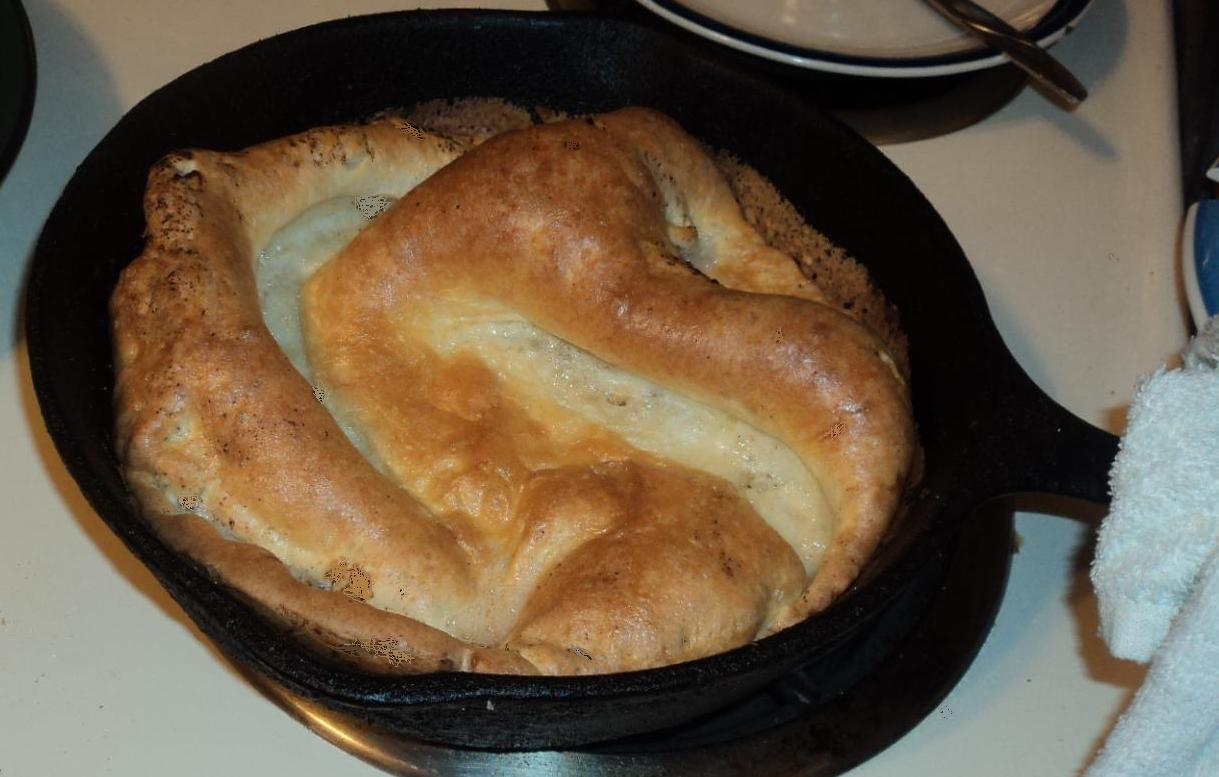
Yorkshire pudding cooked in a 22 cm (8.7 in) diameter cast-iron frying pan

When wheat flour began to come into common use for making cakes and puddings, cooks in Northern England (Yorkshire) devised a means of making use of the fat that dropped into the dripping pan to cook a batter pudding while the meat roasted. In 1737, a recipe for "a dripping pudding" was published in Sir Alexander William George Cassey's book The Whole Duty of a Woman:

Make a good batter as for pancakes; put in a hot toss-pan over the fire with a bit of butter to fry the bottom a little then put the pan and butter under a shoulder of mutton, instead of a dripping pan, keeping frequently shaking it by the handle and it will be light and savoury, and fit to take up when your mutton is enough; then turn it in a dish and serve it hot.

Similar instructions were published during 1747 in the book The Art of Cookery Made Plain and Easy by Hannah Glasse, with the name 'Yorkshire pudding'. It was she who renamed the original version, known as Dripping Pudding, which had been cooked in England for centuries, although these puddings were much flatter than the puffy versions made in modern times. William Sitwell suggests that the pudding got the name 'Yorkshire' due to the region's association with coal and the higher temperatures this produced which helped to make the batter crisper.

Originally, the Yorkshire pudding was served as a first course with thick gravy to dull the appetite with the low-cost ingredients so that the diners would not eat so much of the more expensive meat in the next course. Because the rich gravy from the roast meat drippings was used with the first course, the main meat and vegetable course was often served with a parsley or white sauce. In poorer households, the pudding was often served as the only course. Using dripping, a simple meal was made with flour, eggs and milk. This was traditionally eaten with a gravy or sauce, to moisten the pudding.

The Yorkshire pudding is meant to rise. The Royal Society of Chemistry suggested in 2008 that "A Yorkshire pudding isn't a Yorkshire pudding if it is less than four inches [10 cm] tall".

== Baking method ==
Yorkshire pudding is made by pouring a batter — made from milk, flour and eggs — into hot beef dripping, lard, or other rendered fat (from which it gains its flavour), in a preheated baking pan (ramekins or muffin tins in the case of miniature puddings) and baking in a hot oven. They can also be baked in cast-iron frying pans or similar.

A basic equal-part batter recipe uses 200 ml flour and 200 ml milk with four eggs (also 200 ml). Sometimes a small quantity of baking powder is added to aid the pudding to rise during baking. Replacing the milk with water produces a lighter, crisper, but less sweet pudding.

A 1926 recipe involves covering the pudding with greaseproof paper to steam it and then serving it with jam, butter and sugar.

== Yorkshire Pudding Day ==
National Yorkshire Pudding Day has been celebrated on the first Sunday in February in Britain since 2007. It is celebrated on 13 October in the United States.

== See also ==
- Popover
