= Toad in the hole =

Traditional English dish

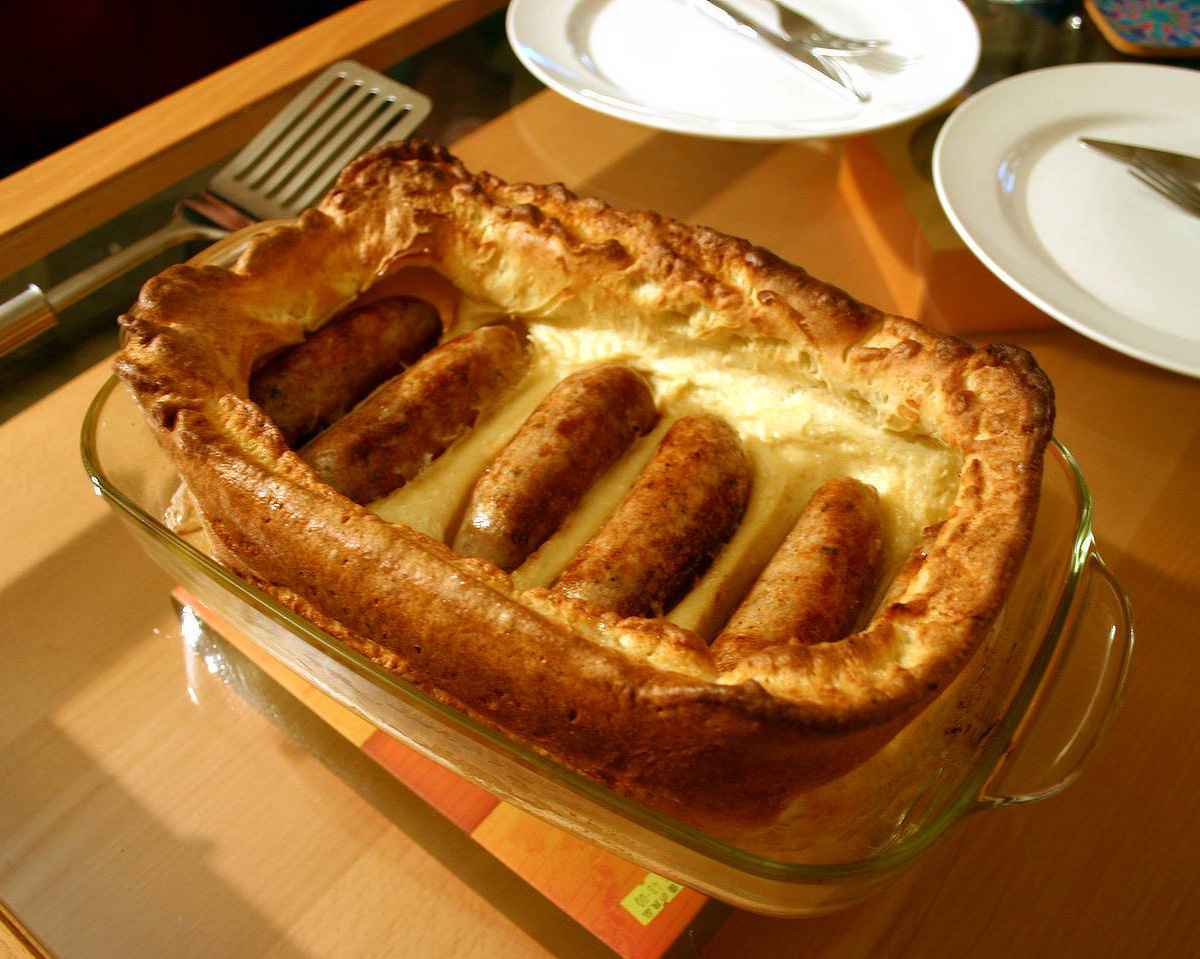
- Toad in the hole
- Alternative names: Sausage toad
- Place of origin: United Kingdom
- Region or state: England
- Serving temperature: Hot
- Main ingredients: Sausages, Yorkshire pudding batter, onion gravy

Toad in the hole is a traditional British dish consisting of sausages in Yorkshire pudding batter, usually served with onion gravy, mashed potatoes and vegetables. Historically, the dish has also been prepared using other meats, such as rump steak and lamb's kidney.

== History ==
=== 18th century origins ===
Batter puddings became popular in the early 18th century. Cookery writer Jennifer Stead has drawn attention to a description of a recipe identical to toad in the hole from the middle of the century.

Dishes like toad in the hole appeared in print as early as 1762, when it was described as a "vulgar" name for a "small piece of beef baked in a large pudding". Toad in the hole was originally created as a way to stretch out meat in poor households. Chefs therefore suggested using the cheapest meats in this dish. In 1747, for example, Hannah Glasse's The Art of Cookery listed a recipe for "pigeon in a hole", calling for pigeon rather than sausages.

=== 19th century ===
In 1852, Charles Elmé Francatelli wrote in his A Plain Cookery Book for the Working Classes, of "a cheap dinner" made from "6d. or 1s." worth of bits or pieces of any kind of meat" baked in a nutmeg-seasoned Yorkshire or suet pudding batter. Mrs. Beeton's Book of Household Management of 1861, listed two recipes: "a homely but savoury dish" from rump steak and sheeps's kidney, and another made with cold mutton with kidneys, oysters or mushrooms. In Pellegrino Artusi's La scienza in cucina e l'arte di mangiar bene (Science in the Kitchen and the Art of Eating Well) of 1891, this dish was described as "lesso rifatto all'inglese" (re-cooked meat in the English style) or rospo nella tana, which was mistranslated as "toad in the bole". In this recipe from the first modern Italian cookbook, after being browned, the seasoned, thinly sliced meat was sprinkled with Parmesan cheese before being cooked in batter.

=== 20th century ===
During World War I, school children were often fed toad in the hole for the midday meal.

=== 21st century ===
In 2017, a marketing survey found that 23% of British people had never tried toad in the hole. In the 21st century, vegetarian and vegan versions of toad in the hole appeared. These included vegan versions made with Linda McCartney Food's vegan sausages and a vegetarian version published by Ravinder Bhogal that combined toad in the hole with cauliflower cheese.

== Name ==
The dish with left over meat was originally not called toad in the hole. In the 1787 book A Provincial Glossary by Francis Grose, for example, "toad in a hole" was referred to as "meat boiled in a crust", though a 28 September 1765 passage in The Newcastle Chronicle reads, "No, you shall lay on the common side of the world; like a toad in a hole that is bak'd for the Devil's dinner". The first appearance of the word "hole" in the dish's name, not counting Pigeons in a Hole found in the cookbook by Hannah Glasse, appeared in the 1900 publication Notes & Queries, which described the dish as a "batter-pudding with a hole in the middle containing meat". Despite popular belief, there is no record of the dish ever being made with toad.

The origin of the name is unclear, but it may refer to the way toads wait for their prey in their burrows, with their heads poking out, just as sausages peep through the batter. It may also derive from the "living entombed animal" phenomenon of live frogs or toads supposedly being found encased in stone, which was a popular hoax / false belief of the late 18th century.

The term is sometimes used for "egg in the basket" (an egg fried in a hole of a slice of bread).

== See also ==
- Corn dog
- English cuisine
- List of meat dishes
- List of sausage dishes
