= Fried onion =

Method of cooking onions

Fried onions are slices of onions that are either pan fried (sautéed) or deep fried — and consumed as a popular snack food, garnish, or vegetable accompaniment to various recipes.

== Sautéed onions ==
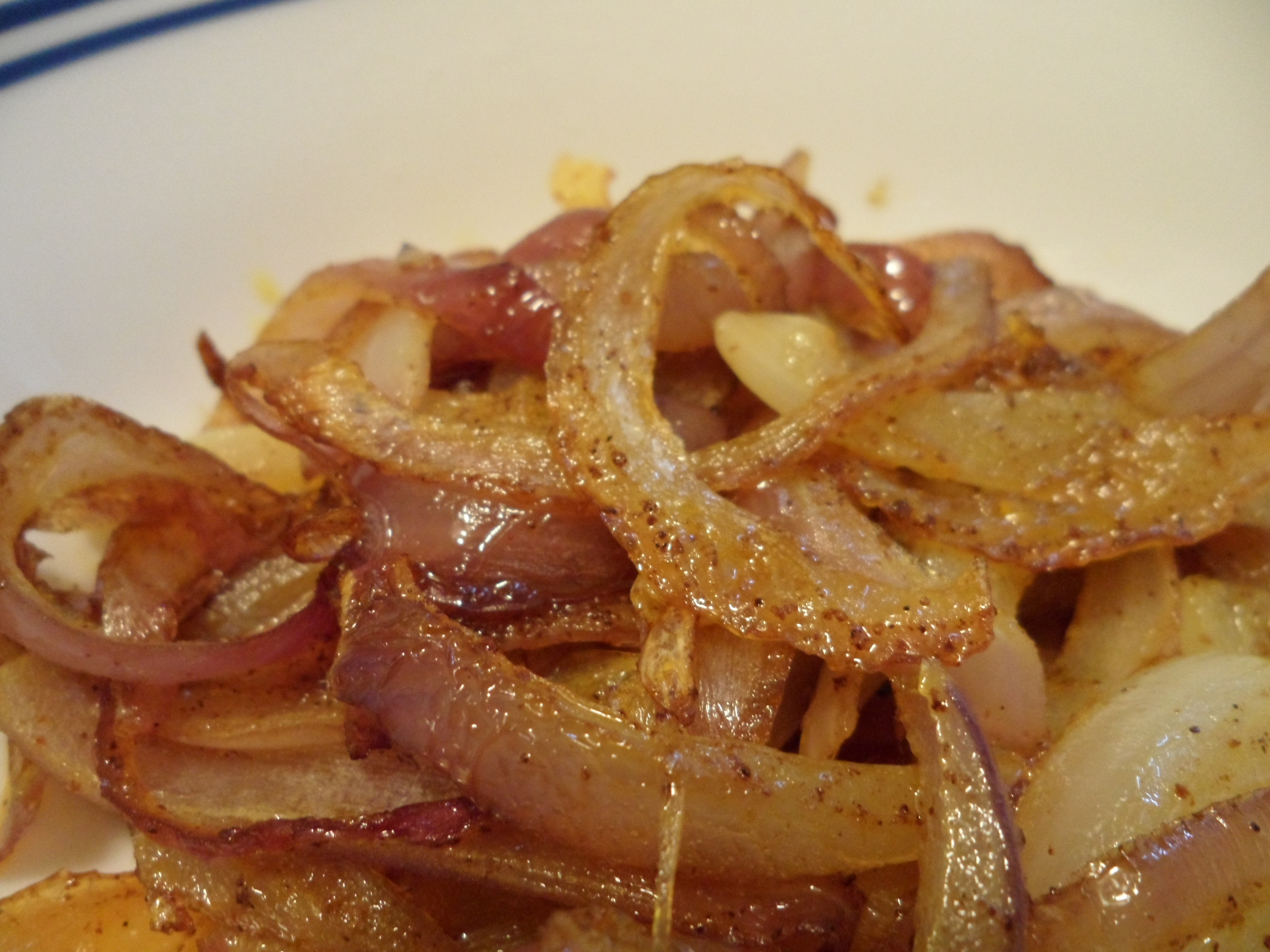
Sautéed onions with seasoning

Common fried onions are cooked by basic pan frying or sautéing of sliced onions. This produces a fairly soft cooked onion, which may brown some from a Maillard reaction, depending on the length of cooking and the temperature. The Philadelphia cheesesteak is a hot sandwich commonly served with sautéed onions, and they are half of the dish called liver and onions. In the Middle East, mujaddara is a dish made of lentils and rice topped with fried onions. In Indian cuisine, fried onions are one of the key ingredients for the rice dish called biryani.

== Crisp fried onions ==
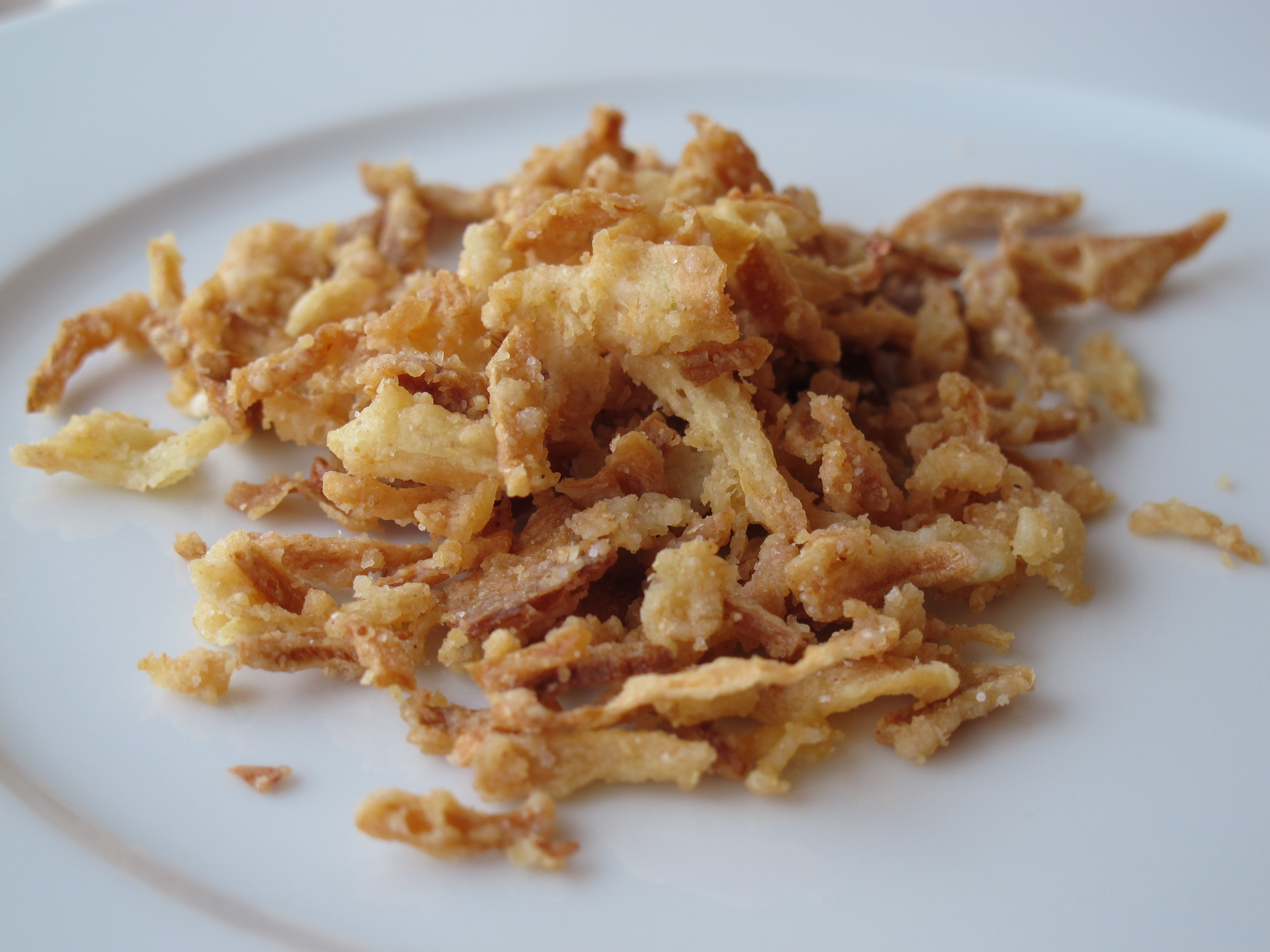
Crisp French fried onions

If the much higher temperature, immersive, deep frying is used, this prepares the onions in a manner similar to that of fried potatoes.

In Sweden and the rest of Scandinavia, known as rostad lök/ristede løg/stekte løk, they are a staple garnish for hot dogs or tunnbrödsrulle, served in local fast food restaurants or by street vendors (which are common in large cities such as Copenhagen and Stockholm).

Crisp fried onions are also used in biriyani for layering and garnishing. They are also a crucial component of the Egyptian national dish kushari, which in addition to always being topped with crispy fried onions, lentils or rice are frequently cooked using the oil in which the onions were fried.

They are called "fried onions" in Southern cooking of the United States. Smaller and irregularly shaped (from being deep-fried until they are crunchy) onions are an integral part of the American dish green bean casserole. Freshly made crisp fried onions may be used as garnishes in some restaurants.

== Variations ==
=== Onion rings ===
Large, often ring-shaped, batter-coated, deep-fried onions are often associated with fast food and casual dining. Examples include onion rings and blooming onions.

=== Fried shallot ===
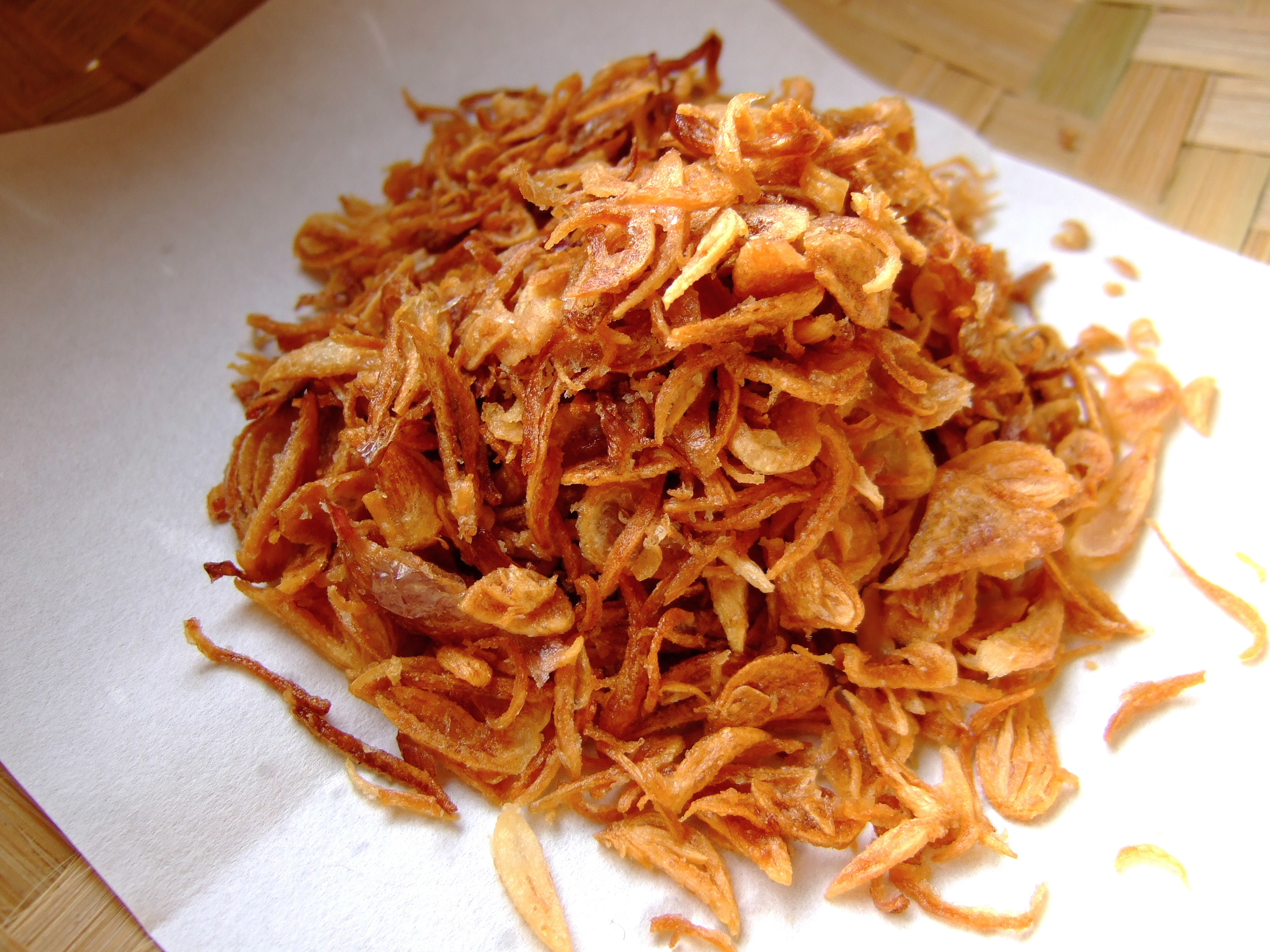
Indonesian crispy bawang goreng or fried shallots

Shallot, a variety of onion, is fried and used in various parts of Asia as a garnish and flavouring ingredient. This includes bawang goreng in Indonesian cuisine, you cong su (油蔥酥) from Taiwanese cuisine, as well as in Thai cuisine. Shallots are thinly sliced and deep fried in plenty of cooking oil until golden crisp, and often placed in a tight glass jar for later use.

Fried shallot has a slightly bitter yet savoury flavour. Crispy fried shallots are often sprinkled upon steamed rice, satay, soto, gado-gado, bubur ayam, and many other dishes as a condiment as well as garnish. They are used for stir-fried vegetables, soups, stews, curries, noodles, rice and salads as toppings. Prepacked bawang goreng fried shallots are available in supermarkets and grocery stores in Indonesia, and also Asian grocery stores abroad.

== See also ==
- Blooming onion
- Funyuns – a fried-onion-flavored snack
- Kushari – which is topped with fried onions
- List of onion dishes
- Lomo a lo pobre
- Onion ring
