= Scallion pancake =

A scallion pancake, also known as a green onion pancake or spring onion pancake, is a kind of pancake made with scallions. It is usually chewy, flaky, and savory.

Examples include:

- Cōng yóu bǐng, a Chinese pancake made with scallions
- Pajeon, a Korean pancake made with scallions

== See also ==
- List of onion dishes
