= Blooming onion =

Culinary dish

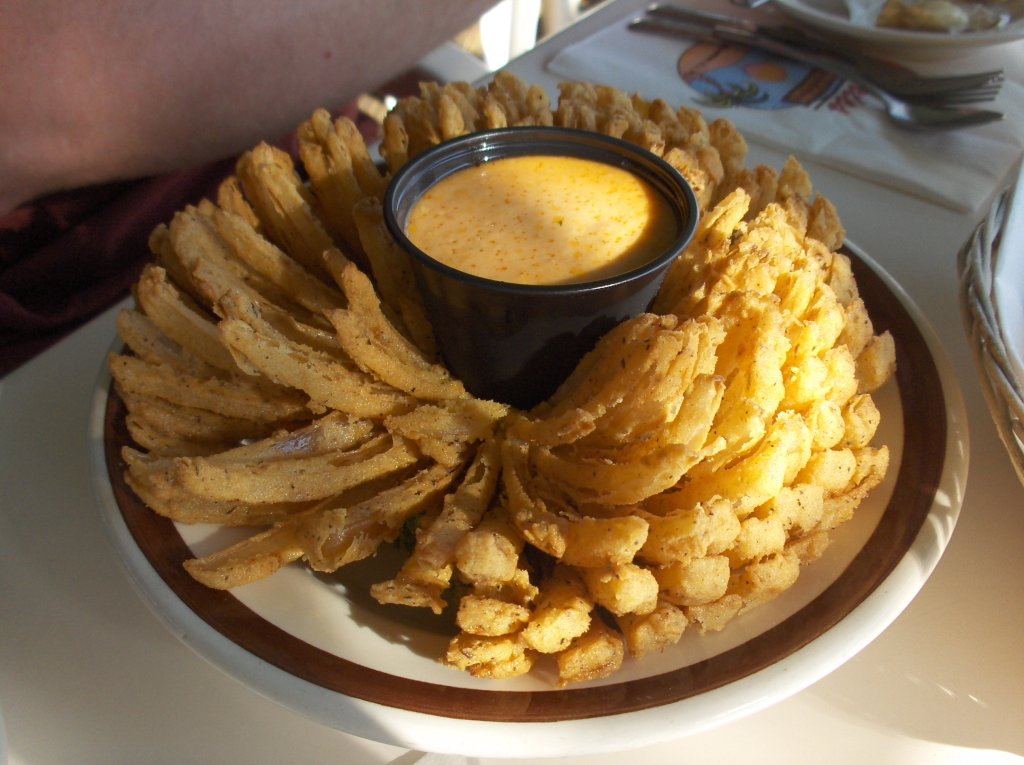
- Alternative names: Onion bloom, onion blossom, onion flower, onion mum
- Course: Hors d'oeuvre
- Place of origin: United States
- Serving temperature: Hot
- Main ingredients: Onion, batter

A blooming onion, also called onion bloom, onion blossom, onion flower, bloomin' onion, or onion mum, is a dish consisting of one large onion, cut to resemble a flower (after it has expanded while soaking in ice water), battered, and deep-fried, often served with dipping sauce. It is served as an appetizer at some restaurants.

== History ==
References to an "onion mum" consisting of an onion cut into the shape of a flower date as far back as 1947, though this dish did not fry or cook the onion. The more popular fried version of the dish was likely invented by Jeff Glowski in 1985 at New Orleans restaurant Russell's Marina Grill, where future Outback Steakhouse founder Tim Gannon worked at the time.

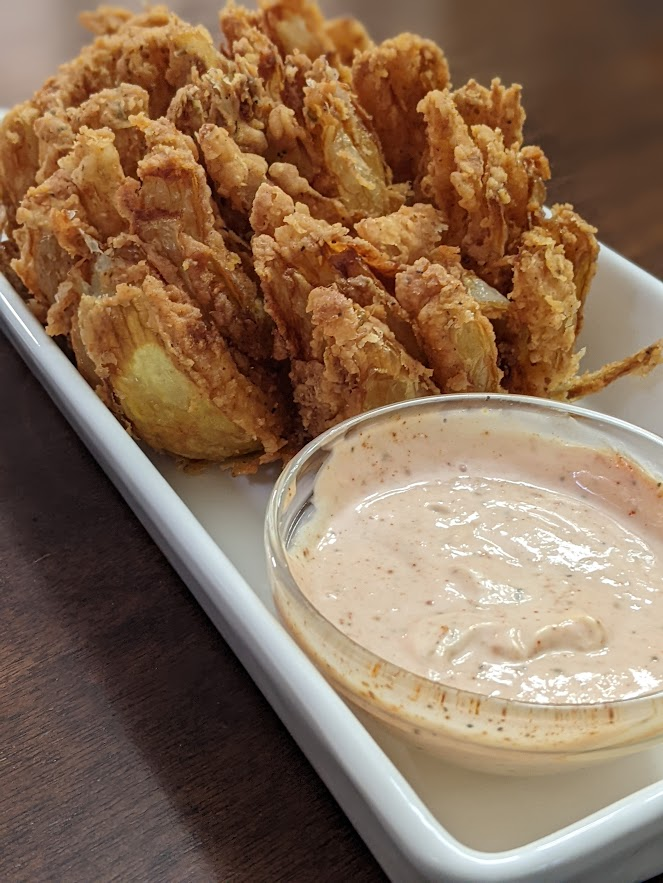
Homemade blooming onion with zesty sauce

The dish was popularized in the United States when it appeared as the "Bloomin' Onion", a charter feature of the Outback Steakhouse when that national chain opened in 1988. It is usually served with a restaurant-specific signature dipping sauce. Despite the name's familiarity and frequent use as a generic term, "Bloomin' Onion" is a registered trademark and Outback's owners have issued legal threats to numerous restaurants over their use of similar names.

== Nutrition ==
The egg wash and deep frying preparation process of the dish means it is high in food energy; a single blooming onion with dressing contains approximately 6,900 kilojoules (1,660 kilocalories) and 87 grams of fat. In 1997, a study by the Center for Science in the Public Interest found a fat content of 116 grams, including a combined 44 grams of saturated and trans fat.

When it existed, the similarly styled Awesome Blossom at Chili's was ranked "Worst Appetizer in America" by Men's Health magazine in 2008 for the unusually high totals of food energy and fat, with 11,300 kJ (2,710 kcal), 203 grams (7,640 kJ or 1,827 kcal) of fat, 194 grams of carbohydrates, and 6,360 milligrams of sodium, with as much fat as 67 strips of bacon. For reference, the U.S. Reference Daily Intake for fat is 65g and for sodium is 2,300 mg, assuming a 8,400 kJ (2,000 kcal) diet, while typical daily food energy recommendations lie in the range of 6,700–12,600 kJ (1,600–3,000 kcal).

== See also ==
- Onion ring
- French fries
- Fried onion
- List of hors d'oeuvre
- List of onion dishes
