= Popover =

Light, hollow roll made from an egg batter

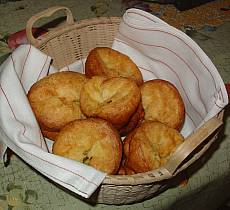
- Type: Pastry
- Place of origin: United States
- Main ingredients: Batter (eggs, flour)

A popover is a light American pastry made from an egg batter similar to that of Yorkshire pudding, typically baked in muffin tins or dedicated popover pans, which have straight-walled sides rather than angled.

Popovers may be served either sweet, topped with fruit and cream/or jelly for breakfast; or savory at afternoon tea with cold cuts.

== Name ==
The name "popover" in American English comes from the fact that the batter swells or "pops" over the top of the tin while baking; in Swabia, sweet (sugared) Swabian popovers are called Pfitzauf.

== History ==
The popover is an American version of Yorkshire pudding and similar batter puddings made in England since the 17th century.

The oldest known reference to popovers dates to 1850. The first cookbook to print a recipe for popovers was in 1876.

A variant of popovers with garlic and herbs is called Portland (Oregon) popover pudding.

== See also ==
- Yorkshire pudding
