= Skirlie =

Scottish dish

- Type: Side dish
- Place of origin: Scotland
- Main ingredients: Oatmeal, fat, onions, and seasonings
- Similar dishes: White pudding

Skirlie is a Scottish dish, made from oatmeal fried with fat, onions and seasonings. The "skirl" indicates the noise made by the frying ingredients. Similar to white pudding, which has similar ingredients but is boiled in a tripe skin, it is served as a side-dish with potatoes, or used as a stuffing for chicken or other fowl. It is also a common side dish to accompany mince and tatties or Christmas dinner, especially in the northeast of Scotland. Suet, lard, beef dripping or butter are used. The addition of salt at the cooking stage is crucial, but a bit less than used to be added as salt is to be found in so many other foods.

== See also ==
- List of onion dishes
- Scottish cuisine
