= Onion ring =

Deep-fried battered onion slices

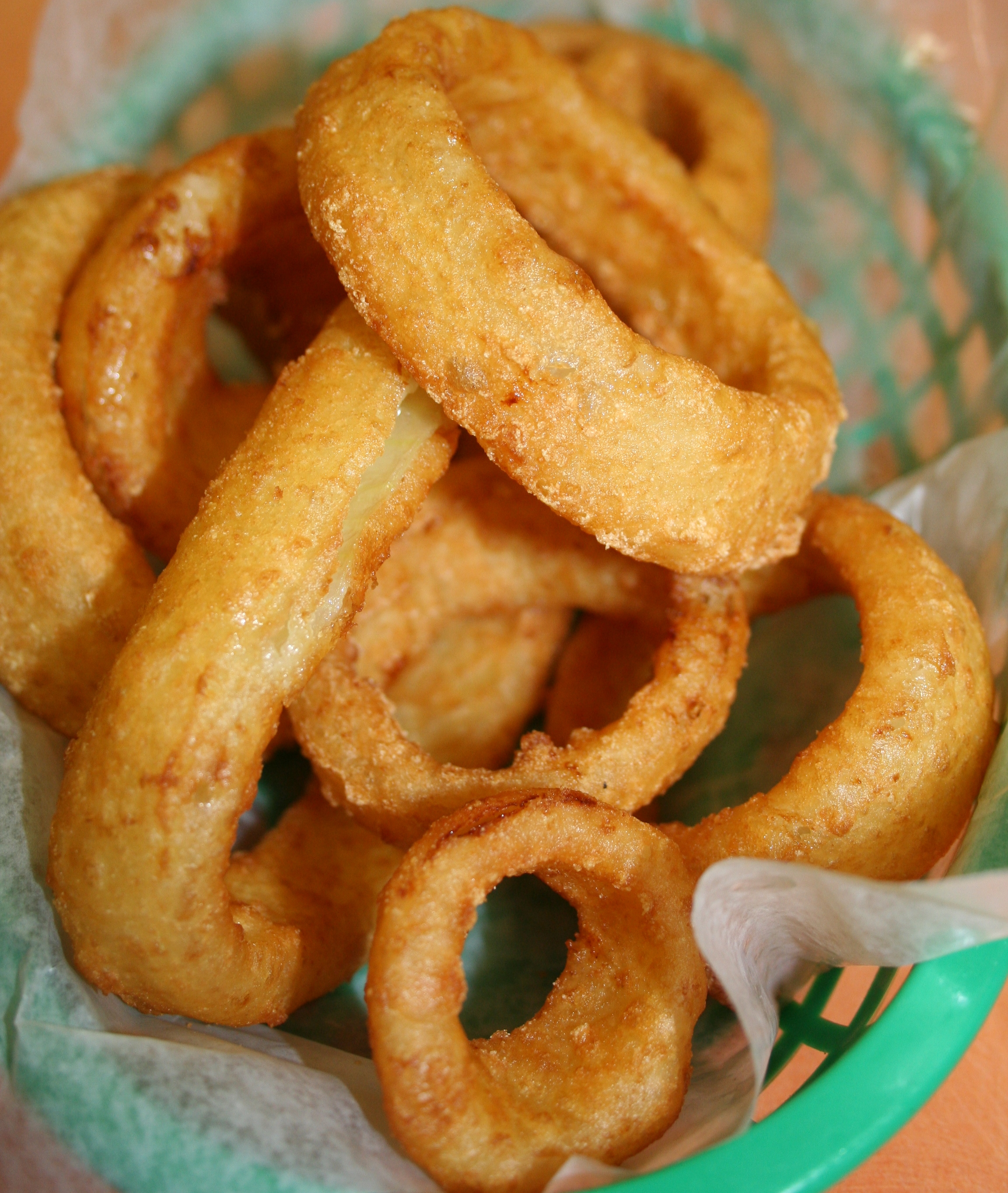
- A basket of onion rings
- Alternative names: French-fried onion rings
- Type: Entrée, main course, side dish
- Course: Hors d'oeuvre
- Place of origin: United Kingdom
- Main ingredients: Onions, batter or breadcrumbs

Onion rings (also called French-fried onion rings) generally consist of a cross-sectional "ring" of onion dipped in batter or breadcrumbs and then deep fried; a variant is made with onion paste. While typically served as a side dish, onion rings are often eaten by themselves.

Onion strings are a variant where the onion is cut vertically first, resulting in strips rather than circles. When cut into wedges, often using sweet onions, they may be known as onion chips.

== History ==
The earliest published recipe for onion rings dates back to 1802, when British food writer John Mollard in The Art of Cookery Made Easy and Refined called for cutting onions into slices, dipping them into a batter including Parmesan cheese, and deep-frying them in lard. The recipe also suggested serving them with a sauce of melted butter and mustard.

Many recipes for deep-fried onion slices or rings are found starting in the early 20th century. There are various processes:

- No coating: 1902, 1907;
- Dipped in milk or egg and coated in flour: 1902, 1908, 1909, 1910, 1916;
- Battered: 1919, 1922;
- Breaded: 1914.

When battered, the batter may be seasoned.

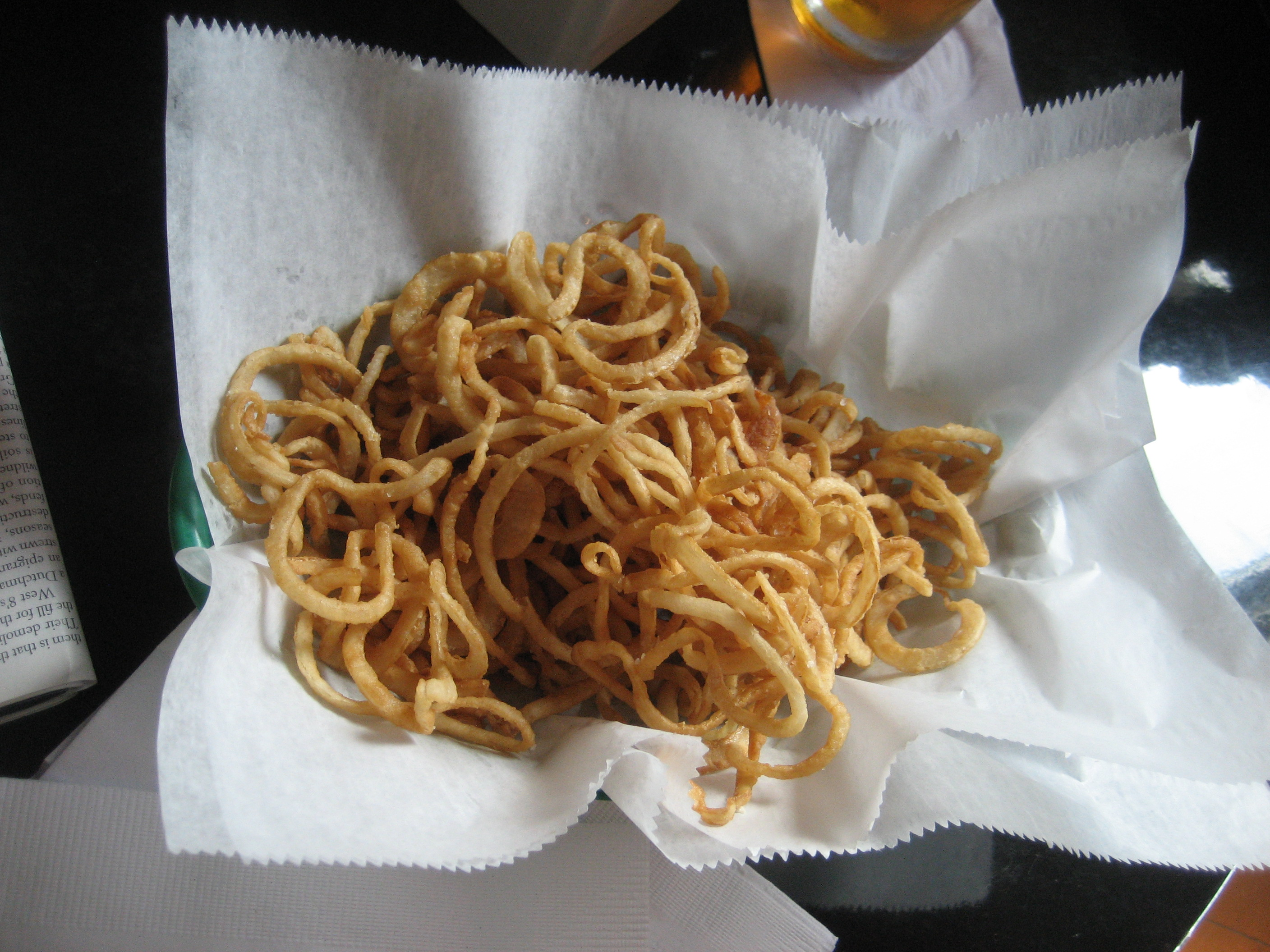
Onion ringlets

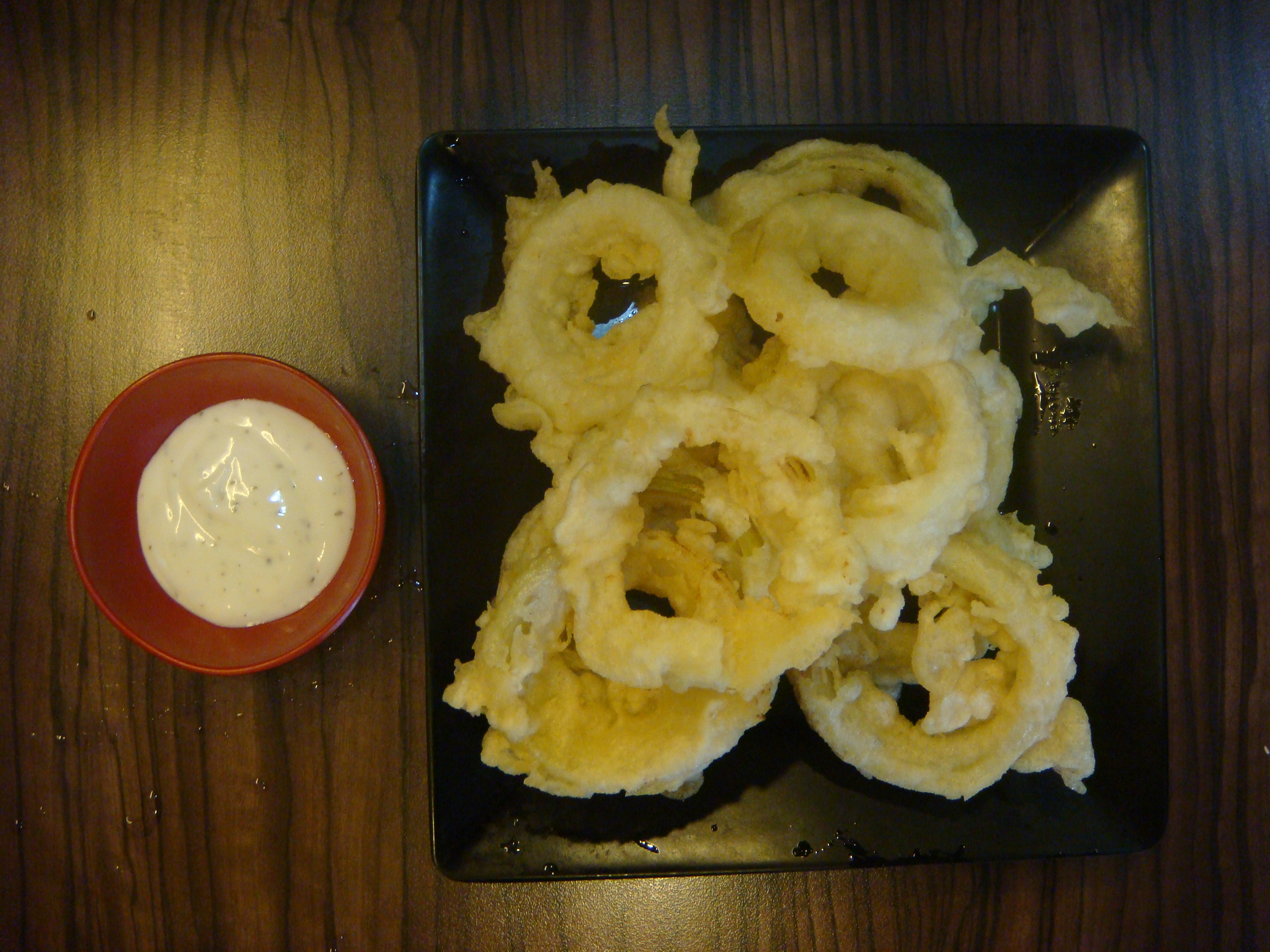
Onion rings with dip sauce (Philippines)

== Food chemistry ==
The cooking process decomposes propanethial oxide in the onion into the sweet-smelling and tasting in bis propenyl disulfide, responsible for the slightly sweet taste of onion rings.

== See also ==
- Blooming onion – a whole onion that is cut into a flower shape that fans out
- Fried onions
- Funyuns – an onion-flavored, corn-based snack food, shaped like onion rings
- List of deep fried foods
- List of hors d'oeuvre
- List of onion dishes
