= Onion sauce =

Culinary sauce made with onions

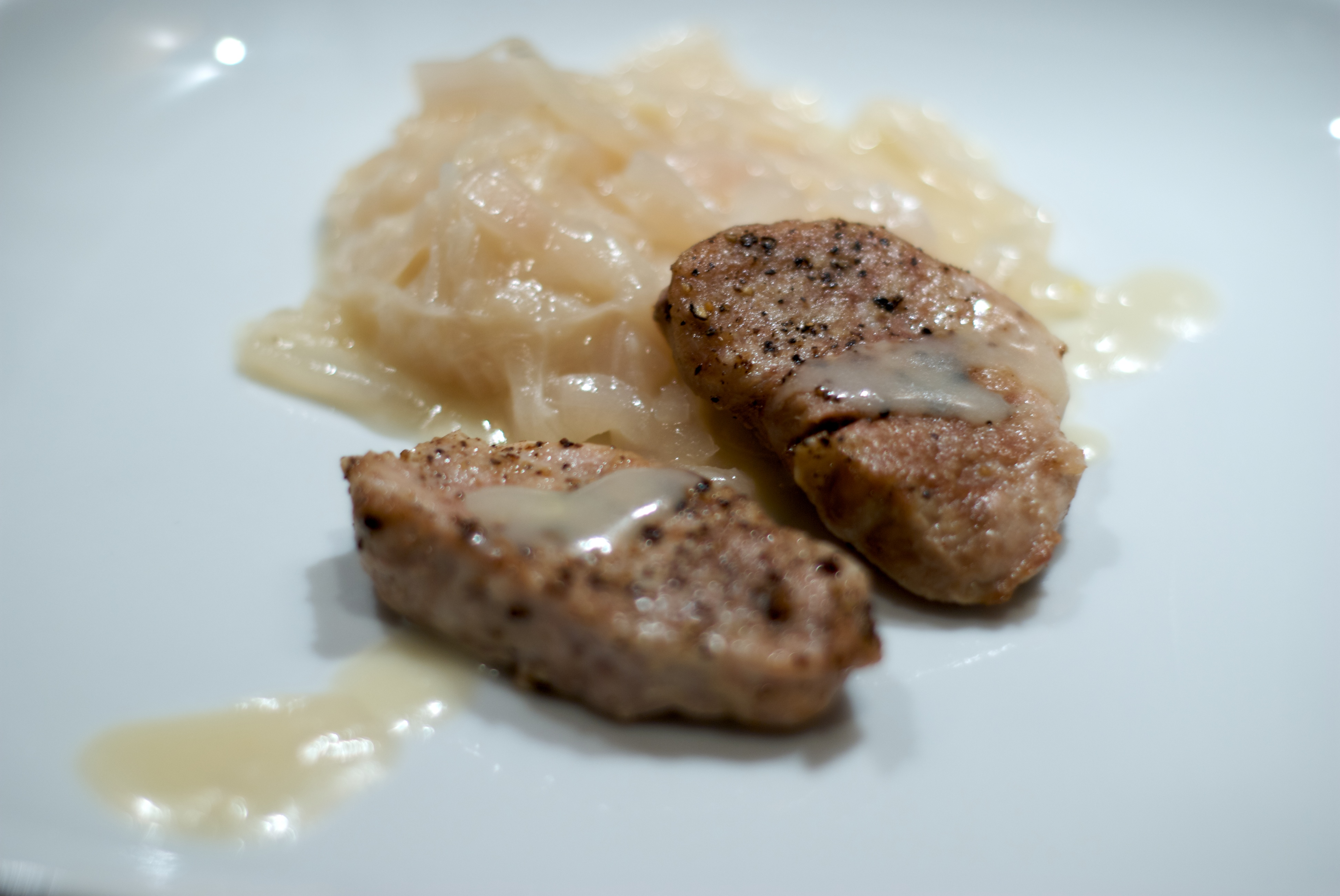
- Pork tenderloin with a dense onion sauce
- Type: Sauce
- Main ingredients: Onion
- Ingredients generally used: Cream, milk, butter, chicken broth, wine, port wine, beer, lemon juice, flour, salt, pepper, cayenne pepper, nutmeg, dry mustard, sage and other herbs, mushroom ketchup, bread crumbs, bacon and others
- Variations: Brown or white

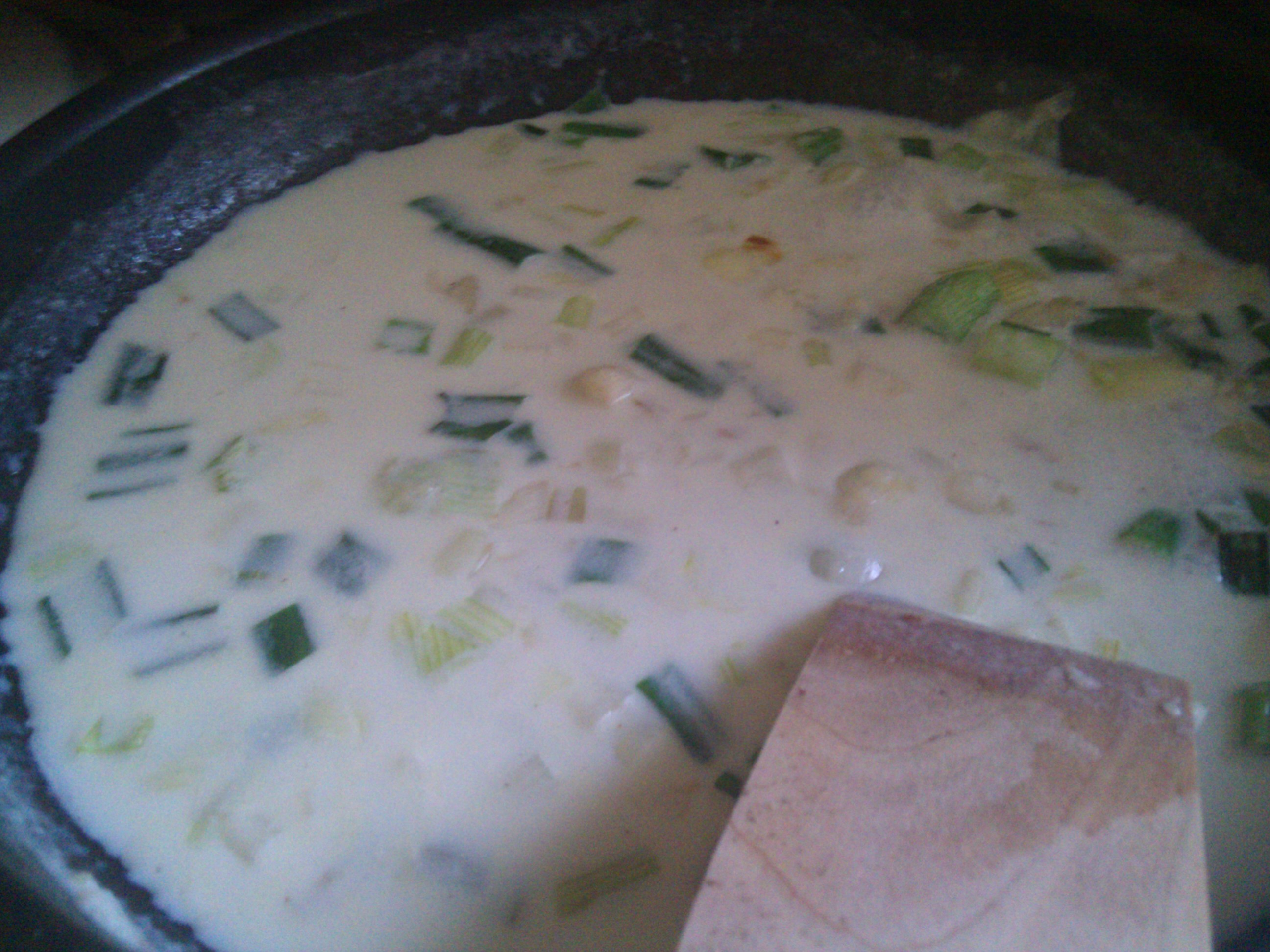
Onion sauce being prepared for new potatoes

Onion sauce is a culinary sauce that uses onion as its primary ingredient. Some onion sauces may use several types of onions in their preparation. Some onion sauces are brown in color, while others are white.

Many various ingredients may be used in preparations of onion sauce, such as cream, milk, butter, chicken broth, wine, port wine, beer, lemon juice, flour, salt, pepper, cayenne pepper, nutmeg, dry mustard, sage and other herbs, mushroom ketchup, bread crumbs, bacon, and others. Preparation generally involves slicing or dicing and then cooking the onions, adding additional ingredients, and then continuing to cook or simmer the mixture to create a sauce. Some preparations involve frying the onions until they are browned, while others do not brown the onions.

Onion sauce can be used to complement many foods, such as potatoes and peas, meats, such as pork, duck, rabbit, mutton, and liver, such as calf liver. Onion sauce prepared with bread crumbs may be used as a stuffing, which can be used in various poultry dishes, such as goose.

In French cuisine, soubise sauce is a well-known onion sauce.

Cebolada is a Portuguese onion stew, onion sauce or paste that is prepared with onion as a primary ingredient. It is used on several Portuguese dishes.

In New York, Sabrett hot dogs are associated with a red tomato-based onion sauce called Sabrett Onions in Sauce. It is a standard condiment at many Sabrett-branded hot dog carts.

== See also ==
- French onion soup
- List of onion dishes
- List of sauces
- Onion gravy
