= Bangers and mash =

Dish of sausages and mashed potato

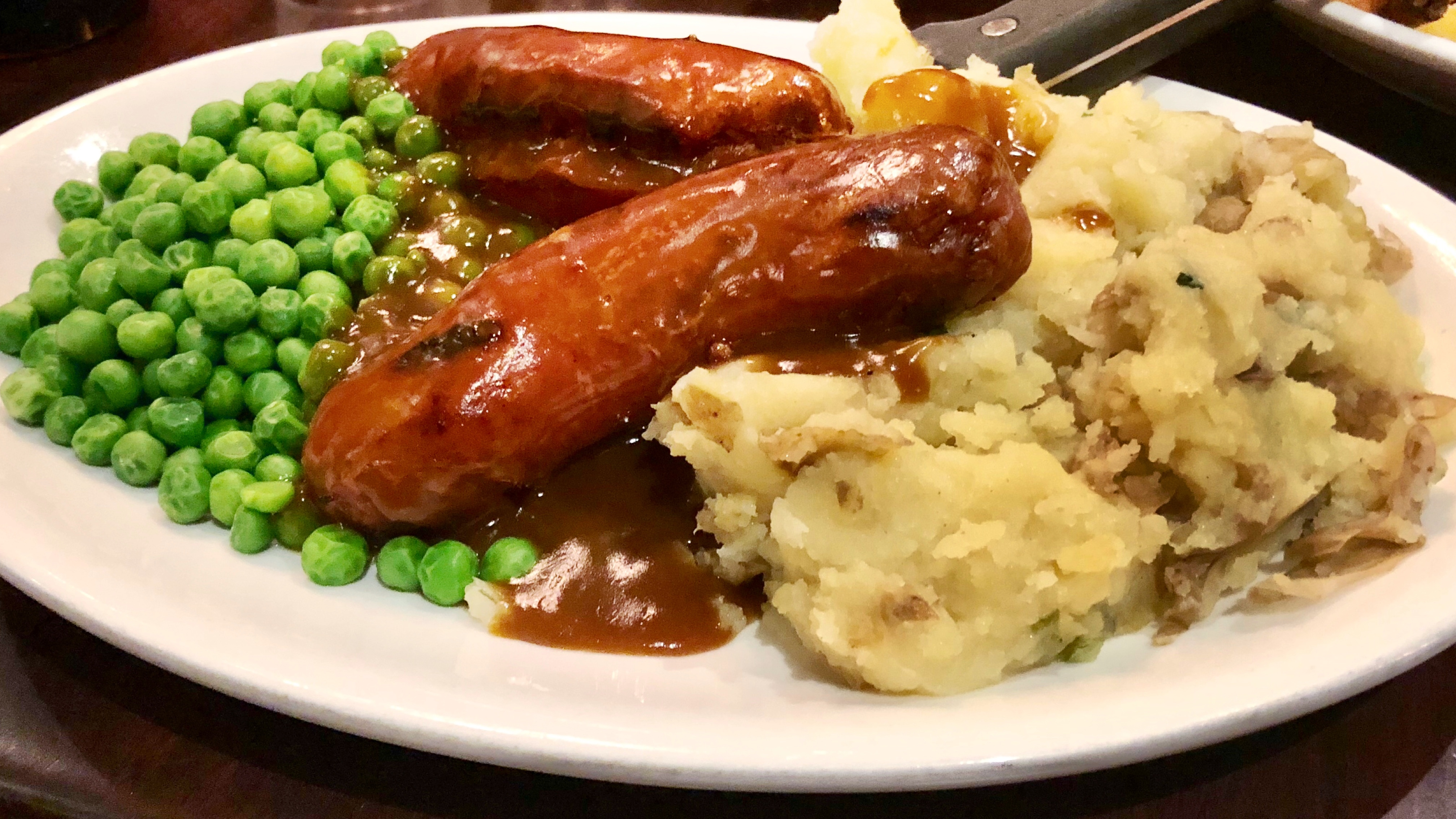
- Bangers and mash, served with peas and gravy
- Alternative names: Sausages and mash
- Place of origin: United Kingdom
- Main ingredients: Mashed potato, sausages

Bangers and mash or sausages and mash is a traditional British dish consisting of sausages and mashed potato. The dish is usually served with onion gravy, and may also include fried onions and peas.

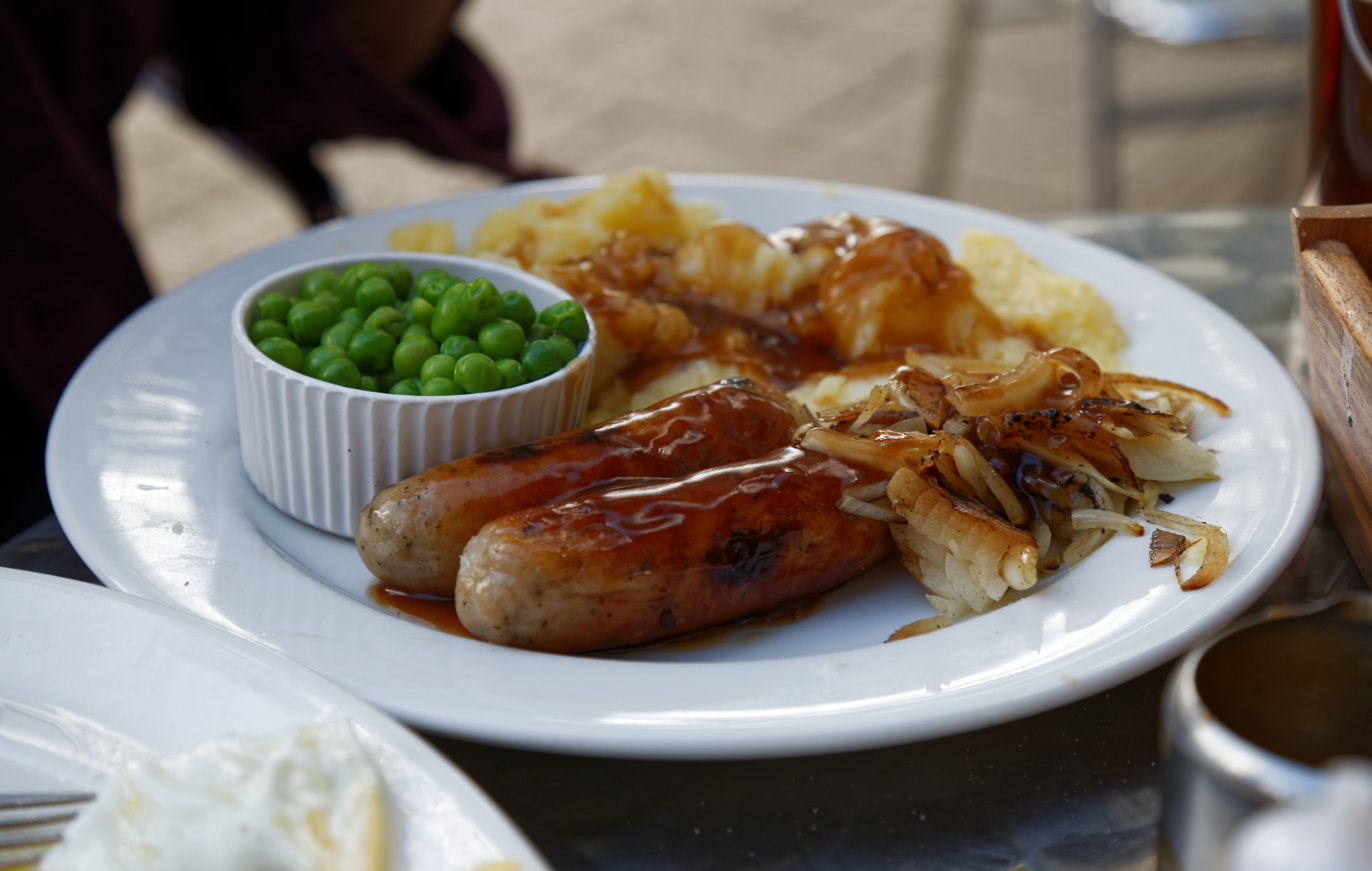
A plate of sausage, mash, onions, and peas served at a pub in Epping, Essex, England

This dish, even when cooked at home, may be thought of as an example of pub grub, meaning it is relatively quick and easy to make in large quantities.

In 2009, the dish was listed as Britain's most popular comfort food in a survey commissioned by TV channel Good Food.

== Etymology ==
Although it is sometimes stated that the term banger has its origins in World War II, it is recorded in use at least as far back as 1919. The term is said to have originated from the fact that sausages produced during the meat rationing of World War I were made with such a high water content that they were liable to explode when cooked.

== History ==
Although the Romans introduced sausages to Britain as early as the 4th century and potatoes arrived from the Americas in the late 16th century, they were not paired as a singular meal until the Industrial Revolution.

The dish began to become especially popular among working class people due to its low cost and high caloric density. In 1747, Hannah Glasse’s The Art of Cookery Made Plain and Easy featured instructions for sausages served with potatoes. However, the dish did not reach its status as a national staple until World War I.

== See also ==
- List of sausage dishes
- List of meat and potato dishes
