= Koshary =

National dish of Egypt

- Koshary
- Type: Mixed macaroni dish
- Course: Main course
- Place of origin: Egypt
- Serving temperature: Warm or Hot
- Main ingredients: Rice, lentils, macaroni, Vermicelli, tomato sauce, vegetable oil, onions, cumin, coriander
- Variations: Chickpeas, Hot sauce, Garlic juice, Vinegar, Short spaghetti

Koshary, daily life dish and practices associated with it
- UNESCO Intangible Cultural Heritage
- Country: Egypt
- Reference: 02278
- Region: Arab States

Inscription history
- Inscription: 2025 (20th session)
- List: Representative

Koshary, Kushari or Koshari (Egyptian Arabic: كشرى [ˈkoʃæɾi]) is Egypt's national dish and a widely popular street food. It is a traditional Egyptian staple, mixing pasta, Egyptian fried rice, vermicelli and brown lentils, and topped with chickpeas, a garlicky tomato sauce, garlic vinegar, and crispy fried onions. Sprinklings of garlic vinegar and hot sauce are optional.

== History ==
The name comes from Hindi khichri, which is also the source of the word Kedgeree, a similar dish.

In 1853, in his book "Journey to Egypt and the Hijaz", explorer Richard Burton documented koshary as the breakfast meal of the people of Suez. It consisted of Egyptian lentils, rice, butter, onions and pickled lemons. This account is thought to be the earliest known English-language written reference to koshary.

Koshary was sold on food carts in its early years, and was introduced to restaurants later.

This dish is widely popular among workers and laborers and the dish is well-suited to mass catering events such as conferences. It may be prepared at home, and is also served at roadside stalls and restaurants all over Egypt; some restaurants specialize in koshary to the exclusion of other dishes, while others feature it as one item among many. As traditionally prepared koshary does not contain any animal products, it can be considered vegan, as long as all frying uses vegetable oil.

In 2025, koshary was recognized as intangible cultural heritage by UNESCO.

== Variants ==
Alexandrian Koshary is quite different from other koshary recipes, with significant variations in taste and form. The cooking process includes yellow lentils and rice; it also uses curry and cumin in the rice, giving the koshary a uniform color. Also included are Egyptian fried eggs, which are boiled and then fried in butter, as well as lightly pickled tomatoes instead of tomato sauce, and French fries on the side.

Koshary has also gained popularity outside of Egypt in recent years, especially in Eastern Arabia and Yemen. There are variations in each country or region, such as adding grilled vegetables and using basmati rice cooked either white or yellow. Other recipes of these regions include using other shapes of macaroni. The recipes could include chicken as well, making them closer to kabsa in some cases.

In Japan, restaurants that serve Koshary have begun to appear, some offering the dish with additions to the original recipe. Nontraditional ingredients, which are not typically found in Egyptian recipes, are basil chicken, raw tomatoes, sour cream, fried eggs, Cheddar sauce, avocado slices, and spicy powder with jalapeño.

=== Dry instant ===
An instant koshary, akin to instant noodles in packaging and preparation, started appearing in Egypt in 2020. It requires hot water and 5 to 10 minutes to be ready to eat.

== See also ==
- Egyptian cuisine
- List of Middle Eastern dishes
- Ful medames
