= Liver and onions =

Prepared dish

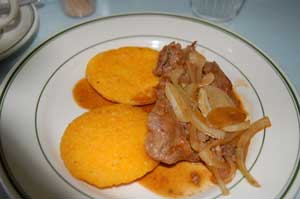
- Tortillas con bistec de hígado, a Panamanian dish of liver and onions
- Place of origin: Unclear
- Main ingredients: Liver and onions
- Ingredients generally used: Bacon, butter, and lard, olive oil
- Variations: Fegato alla veneziana, fegato alla romana

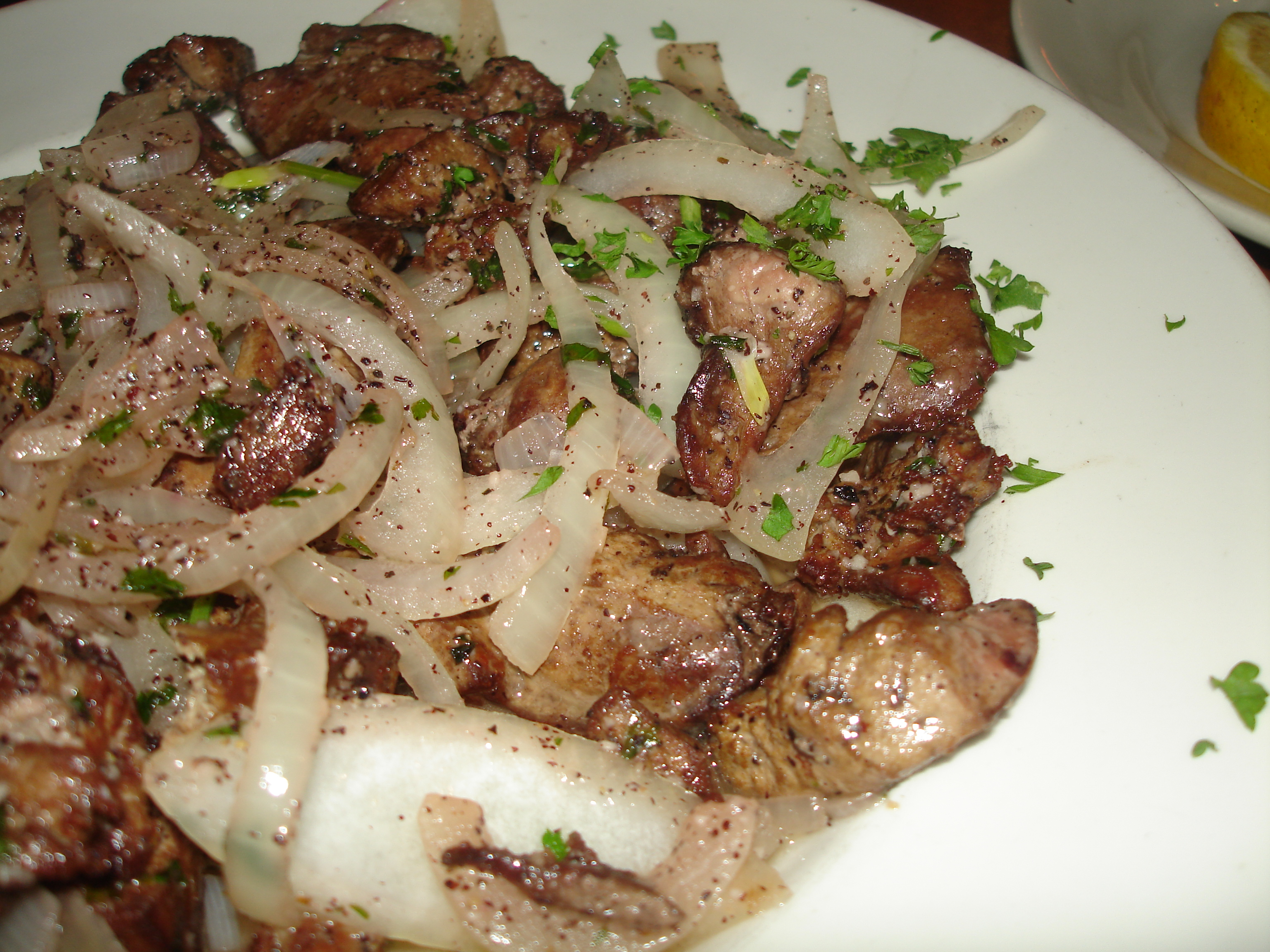
Chicken livers and onions served at a restaurant

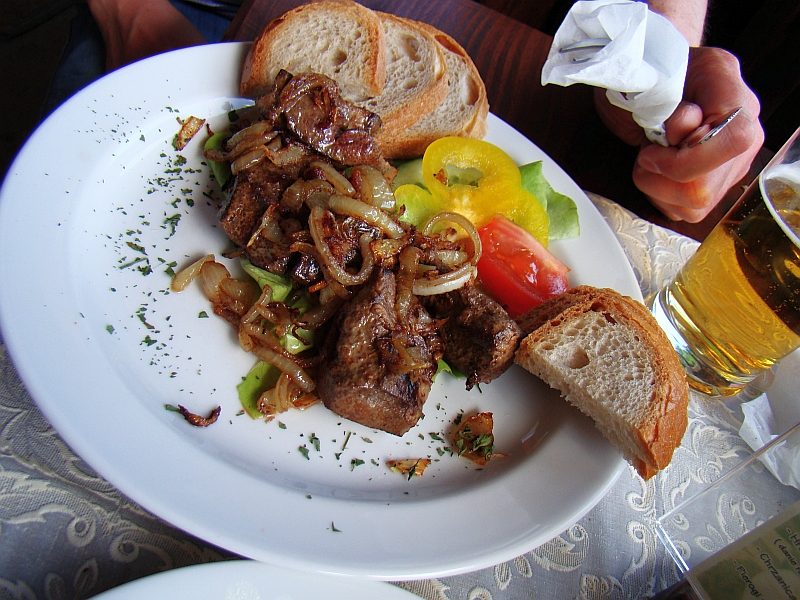
Fried pork liver and onions (Sanok, Poland)

Liver and onions is a dish consisting of slices of liver (usually pork, beef, chicken or, in the United Kingdom, lamb) and onions. The liver and the onions are usually sautéed or otherwise cooked together, but sometimes they may be sautéed separately and mixed together afterwards. The liver is often cut in fine slices, but it also may be diced.

== Description ==
In the French traditional recipe the liver is fried with butter and bacon. In Catalan cuisine olive oil is used instead of butter, and fried garlic are added to the mixture. In Italian cuisine, the fegato alla veneziana (lit. 'Venice-style liver') recipe includes a dash of red wine or vinegar.

== See also ==
- Calf's liver and bacon
- List of onion dishes
