= Mujaddara =

Dish of lentils, rice and sautéed onions

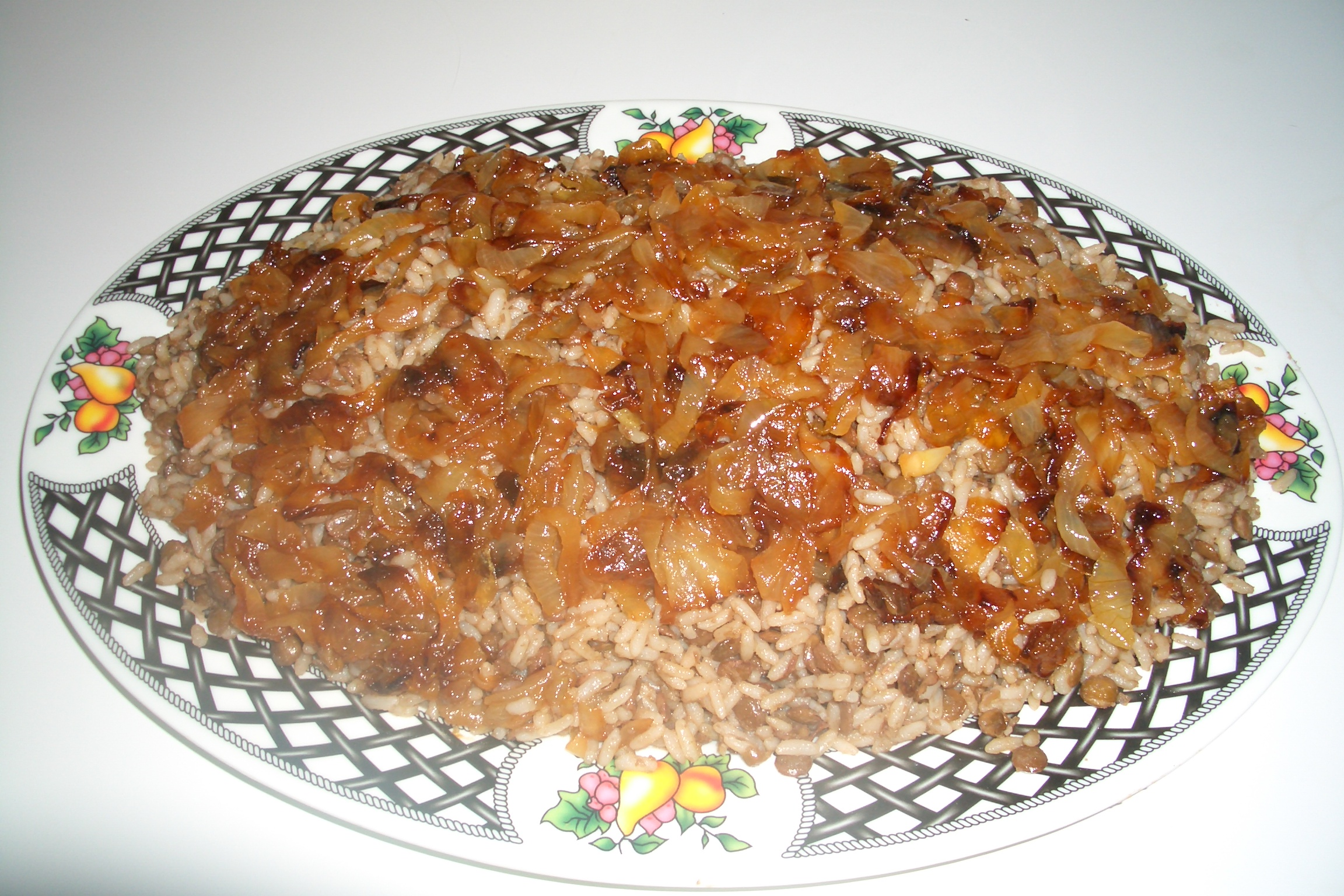
- Mujaddara
- Course: Main
- Place of origin: Abbasid Iraq
- Region or state: The Levant (Middle East)
- Main ingredients: Rice or bulgur; lentils; onions

Mujaddara (Arabic: مجدّرة, romanized: mujaddarah, with alternative spellings in English majadra, mejadra, moujadara, mudardara, and megadarra) is a dish consisting of cooked lentils together with groats, generally rice, and garnished with sautéed onions. It is especially popular in the Levant.

== Etymology ==
Mujaddara is the Arabic word for "pockmarked"; the lentils among the rice resemble pockmarks.

== History ==
According to food historian Gil Marks, rice was introduced to the Middle East by the Persians from India, though it is unknown if the combination of rice and lentil was invented by either.

The first recorded recipe for mujaddara appears in Kitab al-Tabikh, a cookbook compiled in 1226 by al-Baghdadi. Containing rice, lentils, and meat, it was served this way during celebrations. Without meat, it was a medieval Arab dish commonly consumed by the poor. Because of its importance in the diet, a saying in the Eastern Arab world is, "A hungry man would be willing to sell his soul for a dish of mujaddara." Later mentions of mujaddara include an 1895 Egyptian Arabic-to-English dictionary by Socrates-Spiro, which defined mujaddara as "boiled rice and lentils."

Some believe that mujaddara is the lentil soup mentioned in the Book of Genesis.

== Variations ==
Cooked lentils are popular all over the Middle East and form the basis of many dishes. Mujaddara is a popular dish throughout the Arab world, and is generally made using brown or green lentils and rice, which can be seasoned with cumin, coriander, or mint. It is topped with fried onions and is generally served with yogurt, among other vegetables and side dishes, either hot or cold.

In Lebanon, the word mjaddara refers to the puréed version of the dish, rather than the version with whole grains and lentils. Mjaddara usually has the consistency of rice pudding whereas in the Lebanese variant known as mudardara, the rice and lentils remain relatively intact and distinct. Both mujaddara and mudardara are topped with caramelized onions and usually served with yogurt or a salad.

Arab Christians traditionally eat mujaddara during Lent.

The dish is also popular among Sephardic and Jewish communities of Middle Eastern origin, in particular those of Syrian and Egyptian backgrounds; it is generally made with rice rather than wheat.

The dish is also popular among Druze in the Levant.

Some Palestinians replace the rice with bulgur; the dish is called m'jaddaret-burghul to distinguish it from the m'jaddara which is served with rice. Pronounced as m'jaddara, the dish is served multiple times a month for family, cooked with olive oil and onion strips, and served alongside local plain sheep's-milk yogurt (laban n'aj) made in Nablus, with green salad. Bulgur wheat mujadda is also common in Southern Lebanon.

== Similar dishes ==
In Egyptian cuisine, lentils, rice, macaroni, and tomato sauce cooked together are known as kushari. In Indian cuisines, lentils cooked together with rice are known as khichdi (see also kedgeree). In Iranian cuisine, a similar dish composed of rice and lentils is called addas polo.

In Cypriot cuisine, the dish called fakes moutzentra (φακές μουτζιέντρα; [fa'kes mu't͡ʃendra]) is very similar to mujaddara, as it consists of lentils and rice. In Greek, fakes means lentils.
