= Gravy Train =

Gravy Train may refer to:

== Film and television ==
- The Gravy Train, a 1974 American crime-comedy film
- GravyTrain, a 2010 Canadian comedy film
- The Gravy Train (TV series), a British series written by Malcolm Bradbury

== Music ==
=== Performers ===
- Gravy Train (band), a 1970s British rock group
- Gravy Train!!!!, a 2000s American electro group
- Kev Gray & The Gravy Train, an alternative pop band formed in 2008

=== Albums ===
- Gravy Train (Gravy Train album), 1970
- Gravy Train (Lou Donaldson album), 1962

=== EPs ===
- Gravy Train (EP), a 2014 EP by Hoodoo Gurus

=== Songs ===
- "Gravy Train", by Mark Knopfler from the single "Darling Pretty", 1996
- "Gravy Train", by Pig from Praise the Lard, 1991
- "Gravy Train", by Samson from Live at Reading '81, 1990
- "Gravy Train", by Snoop Doggy Dogg from Death Row: The Lost Sessions Vol. 1, 2009
- "Gravy Train", by Splinter from The Place I Love, 1974
- "Gravy Train", by Status Quo from In Search of the Fourth Chord, 2007
- "Gravy Train", by UB40 from For the Many, 2019
- "Gravy Train", by Yung Gravy from Sensational, 2019
- "The Gravy Train", by Ian Brown from Music of the Spheres, 2001
- "The Gravy Train", from the stage musical Expresso Bongo, 1958

== Other uses ==
- Gravy Train (dog food), an American dog food brand
- The Gravy Train, a 2003 book by Philip Bushill-Matthews
