= Onion gravy =

Type of sauce

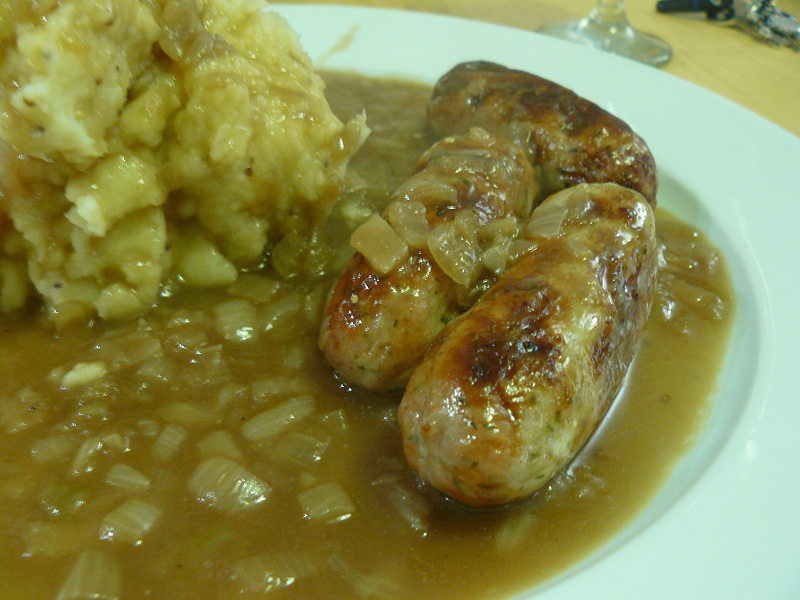
- Bangers and mash with onion gravy
- Type: Gravy
- Main ingredients: Onion
- Ingredients generally used: Broth, flour

Onion gravy is a type of gravy prepared with onion. Various types of onions are used in its preparation. Some preparations caramelise the onions. Onion gravy may be served to accompany many foods, such as pork, beef steak, meatloaf, hamburger, bangers and mash, hot dogs, and chips, among others. Vegan onion gravy also exists, which may use seitan cooking broth in its preparation. Premade mixes and formulations also exist, such as solid sauce bars.

== Ingredients ==
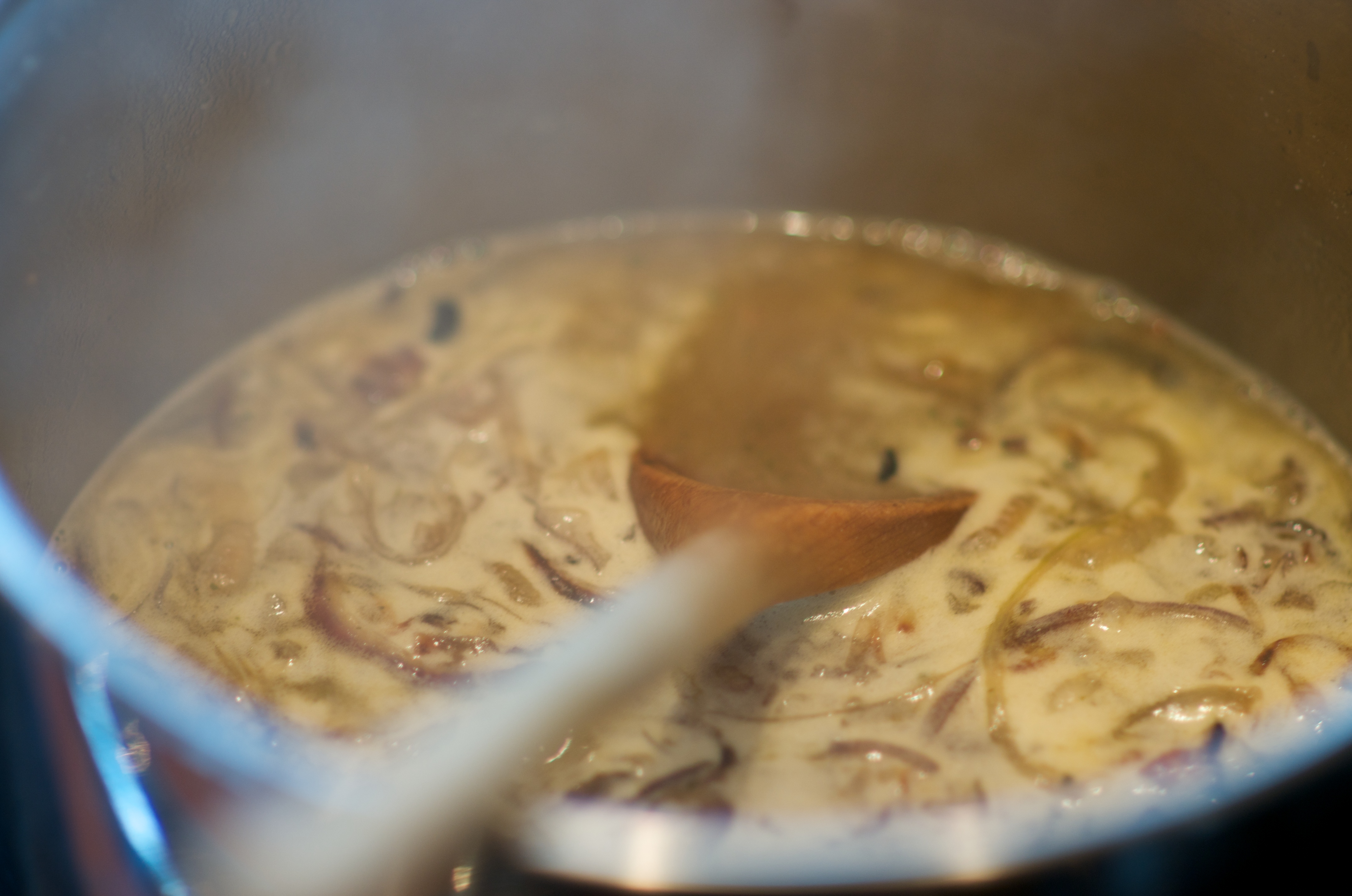
Roasted onion gravy

Primary ingredients include onion, broth or stock, such as beef or chicken stock, and flour. Sweet onion is used in some versions, and some versions incorporate beer or red wine in the gravy. Additional ingredients may include cream, garlic, bread crumbs, butter, vegetable oil, and brown sugar, among others. Various herbs and spices may be used, such as salt, pepper, sage, oregano, and thyme.

== See also ==
- List of gravies
- List of sauces
- Onion sauce
