= List of meat dishes =

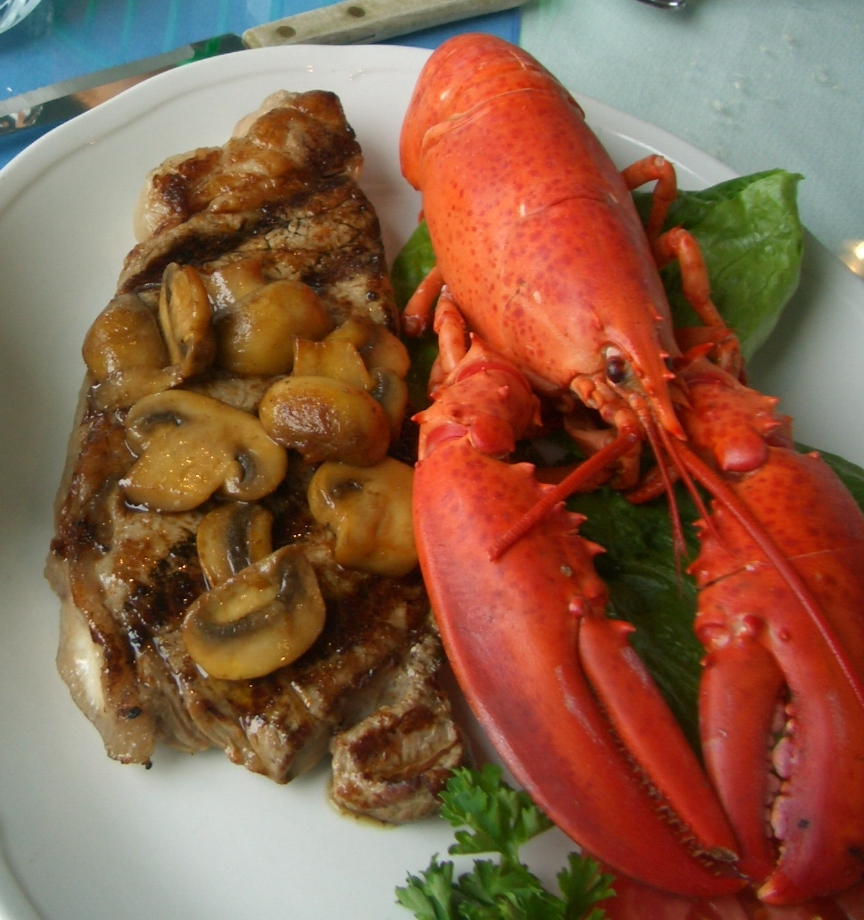
Steak and lobster is a surf and turf dish.

This is a list of notable meat dishes. Some meat dishes are prepared using two or more types of meat, while others are only prepared using one type. Furthermore, some dishes can be prepared using various types of meats, such as the enchilada, which can be prepared using beef, pork or chicken.

== Meat dishes ==
The following meat dishes are prepared using various types of meats, and some are prepared using two or more types of meat in the dish.

- Anticucho – popular and inexpensive dishes that originated in the Andes during the pre-Columbian era. While anticuchos can be made of any type of meat, the most popular are made of beef heart (anticuchos de corazón).
- Asocena
- Baeckeoffe – a French casserole dish prepared using mutton, beef and pork
- Bangers and mash
- Barbacoa
- Berner Platte – a traditional meat dish of Bernese cuisine in Switzerland. It consists of various meat and sausage varieties such as smoked pork and beef, pork belly, sausage, bacon and pork ears or tails cooked with juniper-flavored sauerkraut, and other foods such as potatoes and green beans or dried beans, which are served on a large plate.
- Beşbarmaq
- Birria

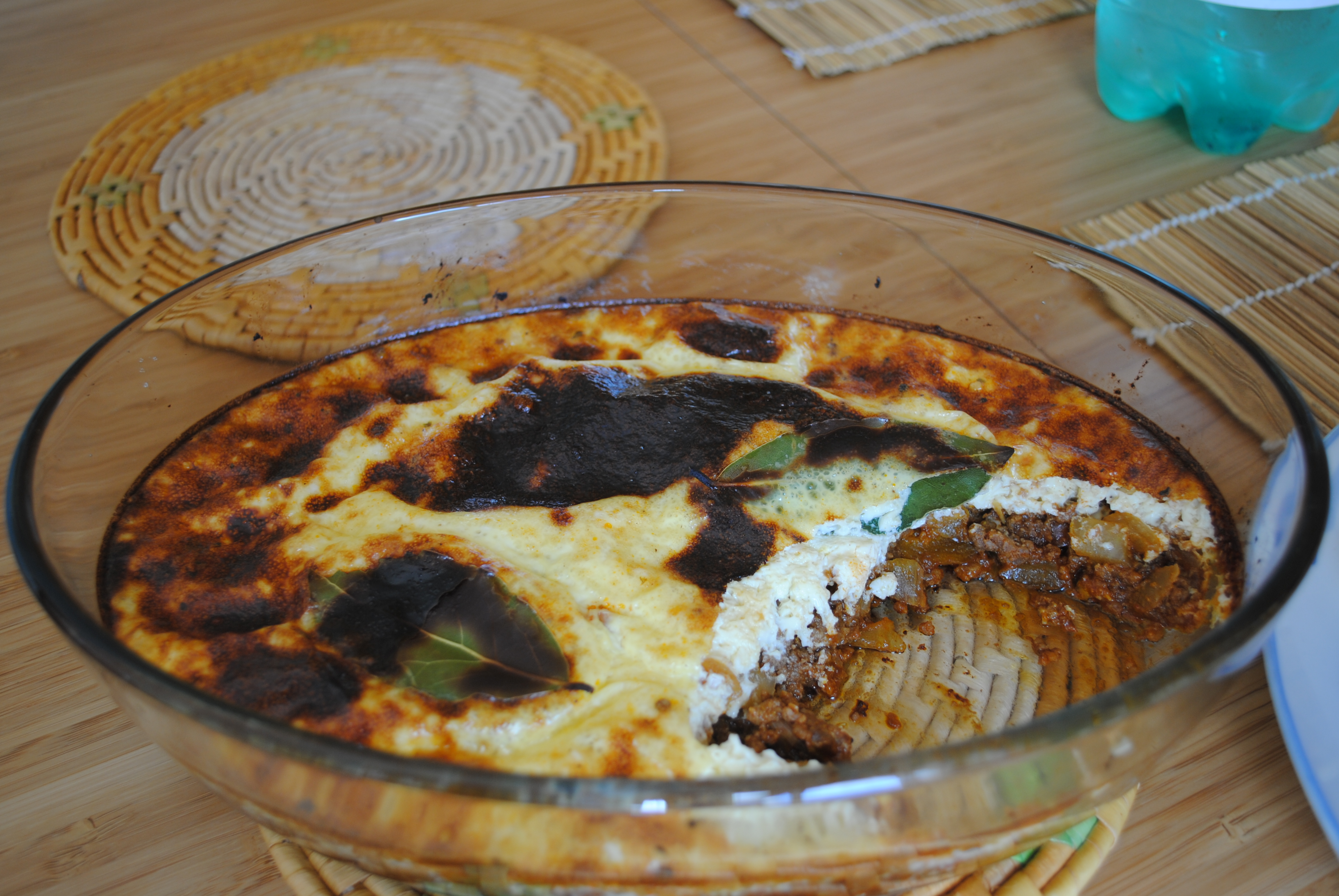
Bobotie

- Bobotie – a South African dish consisting of spiced minced meat baked with an egg-based topping.
- Boliche
- Bosintang – a Korean soup that includes dog meat as its primary ingredient.
- Braciola
- Breaded cutlet – a dish made from coating a cutlet of meat with breading or batter and either frying or baking it.
- Brunswick stew
- Burgoo – a spicy stew that originated in the U.S. state of Kentucky, it is also referred to as "roadkill soup". It can be prepared using pork, chicken or mutton.
- Cabeza guateada – a traditional earth oven dish from Argentina made with the head of a cow and condiments.
- Capuns
- Carimañola
- Carne a la tampiqueña
- Carne pinchada – a Nicaraguan dish consisting of meat (such as beef or chicken) marinated in an alcohol sauce, using beer (Tona or Victoria) or wine.
- Carne pizzaiola
- Carpaccio
- Chiles en nogada
- Chislic
- Chunla
- Churrasco
- Çiğ köfte
- City chicken
- Cockentrice – a dish consisting of a suckling pig's upper body sewn onto the bottom half of a capon or turkey. Alternately, the front end (head and torso) of the poultry is sewn to the rump of the piglet. The dish originates from the Middle Ages and at least one source attributes the Tudor dynasty of the Kingdom of England as its originator.
- Compote – a game meat dish
- Curanto
- Discada – a mixed meat dish popular in northern Mexican states, it includes a mixture of grilled meats cooked on an agricultural plow disk harrow, hence its name.
- Durus kura — a whole chicken roast
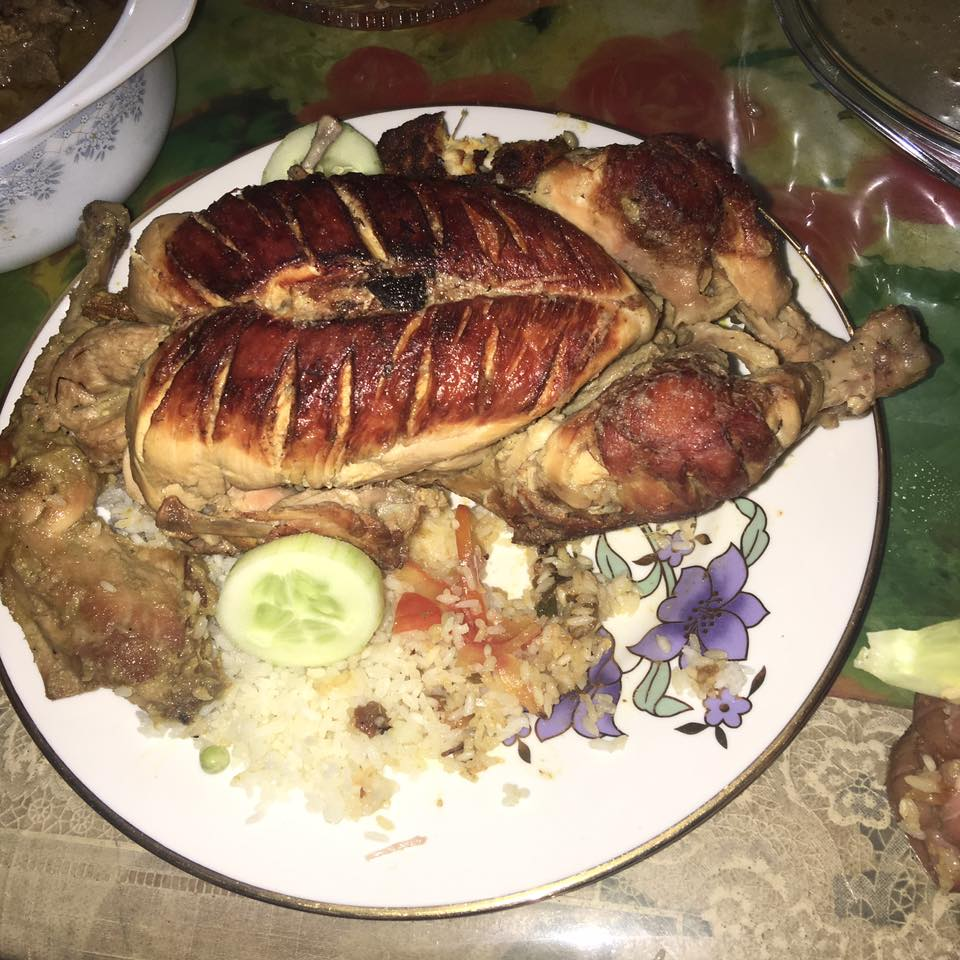
  Durus kura or Chittagonian Musallam
- Enchilada
- Escalope – boneless meat that has been thinned out using a mallet, rolling pin or beaten with the handle of a knife, or merely butterflied. The mallet breaks down the fibers in the meat, making it more tender, while the thinner meat cooks faster with less moisture loss. The meat is then coated and fried.
- Farsu magru – a traditional meat roll dish in Sicilian cuisine that dates to the 13th century prepared using beef or veal.
- Fatányéros
- Finnbiff
- Flurgönder

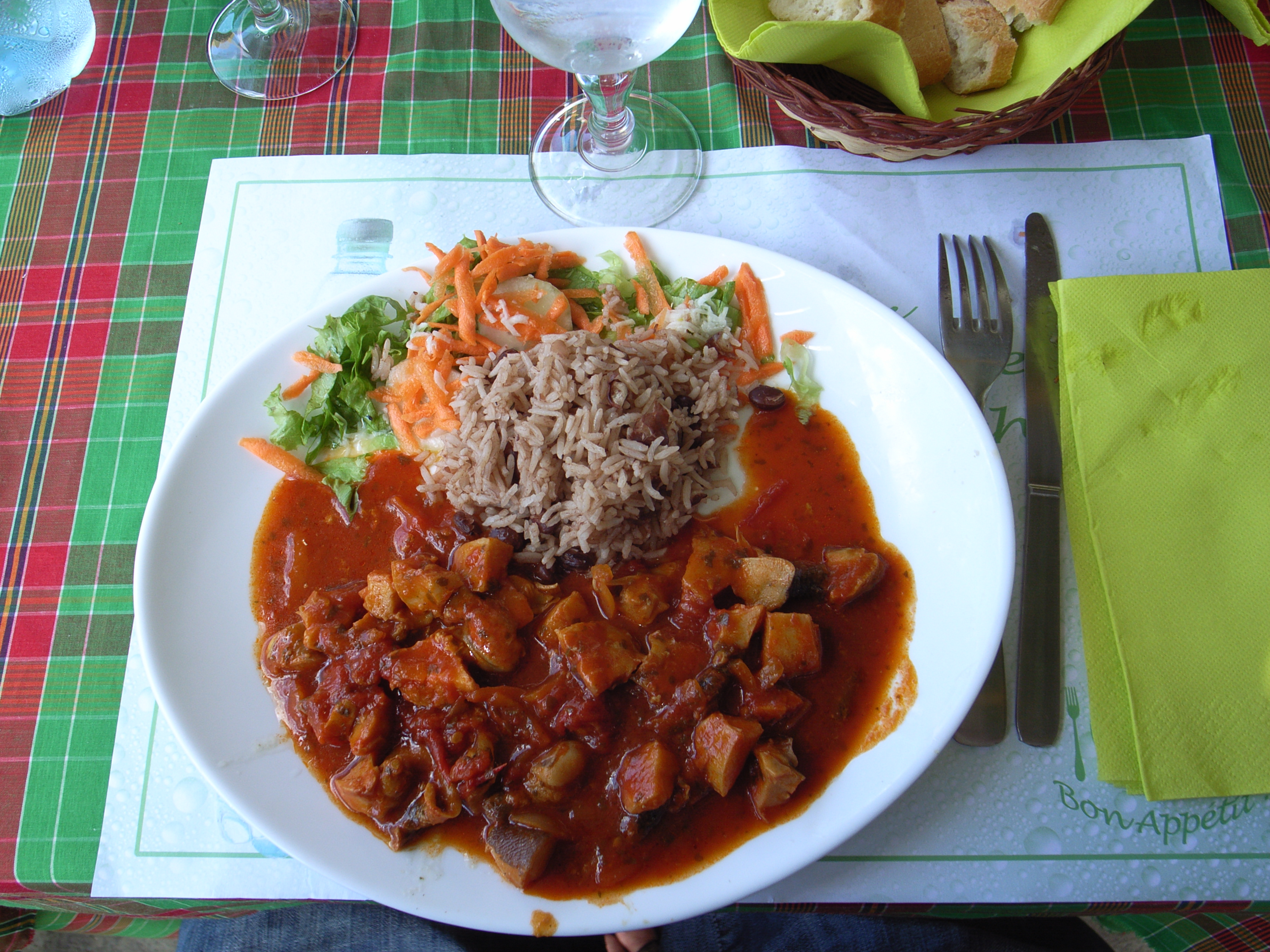
A fricassee dish prepared using conch

- Fricassee – a method of cooking meat in which it is cut up, sautéed and braised, and served with its sauce, traditionally a white sauce. Fricassee can also refer to a type of sandwich made in Tunisia with fried bread and typically filled with many ingredients including tuna, olives, hard-boiled egg, middle eastern tomato salad, and others.
- Frigărui
- Giouvetsi
- Güveç
- Guyanese pepperpot – A Guyanese dish prepared using meats such as beef, pork and mutton
- Gyro
- Hachee
- Haggis
- Hodge-Podge – a meat soup
- Inihaw
- Jerusalem mixed grill – a grilled meat dish considered a specialty of Jerusalem. It consists of chicken hearts, spleens and liver mixed with bits of lamb cooked on a flat grill, seasoned with onion, garlic, black pepper, cumin, turmeric, olive oil and coriander.
- Jugging – the process of stewing whole animals, mainly game or fish, for an extended period in a tightly covered container such as a casserole or an earthenware jug
- Kaalilaatikko
- Kachilaa

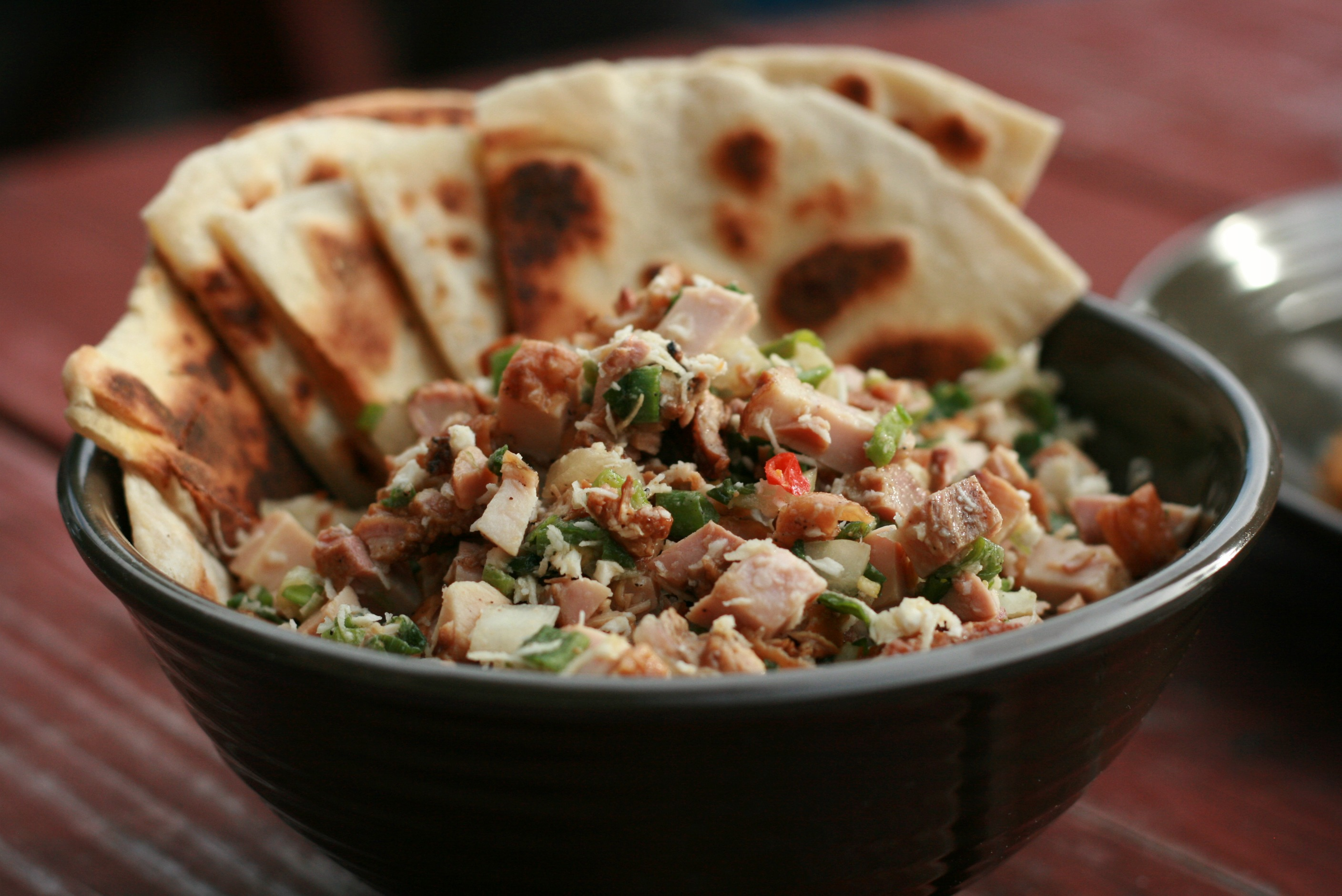
Kelaguen

- Kelaguen
- Khorovats
- Kibbeh nayyeh – a Levantine mezze consisting of minced raw lamb or raw beef mixed with fine bulgur and spices.
- Kielbasa
- Kiviak
- Kohlwurst
- Koi
- Korean barbecue – refers to the Korean method of roasting meat, typically beef, pork, or chicken. Such dishes are often prepared at diner table on gas or charcoal grills, built into the table itself.
- Kutti pi

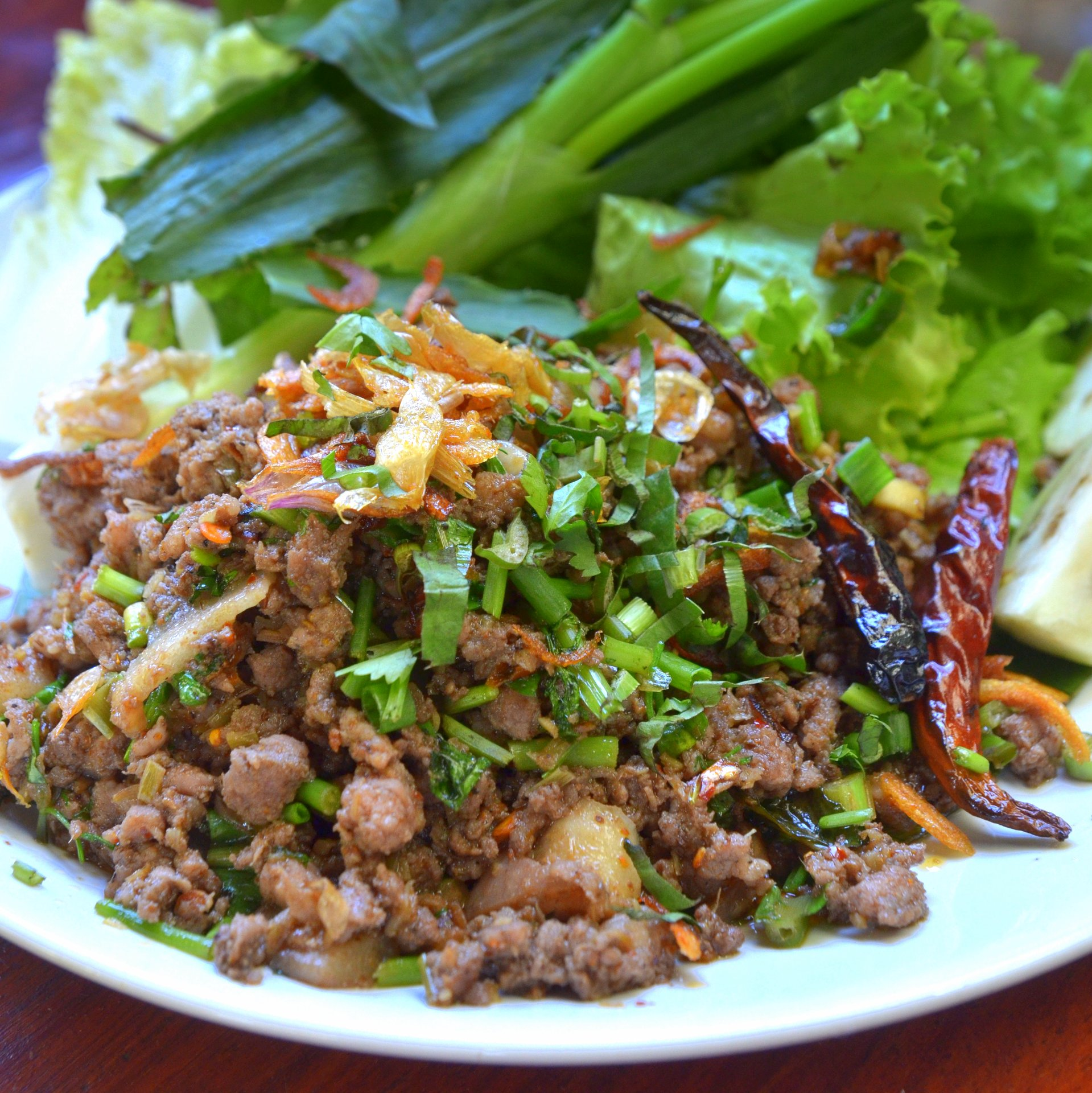
Larb khua mu, a stir-fried northern Thai larb made with pork, in Chiang Mai

- Larb – a type of Lao meat salad most often made with chicken, beef, duck, fish, pork or mushrooms
- Laurices
- Lawar
- Lihapiirakka
- Lomo a lo pobre – in Peruvian cuisine, consists of a cut of beef tenderloin (Spanish lomo) topped with one or more fried eggs and generally served with French fries and fried onions.
- Lörtsy
- Maksalaatikko – a Finnish liver casserole that is traditionally eaten on Christmas
- À la Maréchale – a method of food preparation in haute cuisine, dishes à la Maréchale are made from tender pieces of meat, such as cutlets, escalopes, supremes, sweetbreads, or fish, which are treated à l'anglais ("English-style"), i.e. coated with eggs and bread crumbs, and sautéed.
- Meatcake
- Menchi-katsu
- Mett
- Mikoyan cutlet – was a Soviet semi-processed ground meat cutlet variety on the basis of American hamburger beef patty, nicknamed after Soviet politician Anastas Mikoyan. In 1964, The New York Times reported that the Mikoyan cutlet was "the cheapest, most popular if not most revered piece of meat a few kopecks can buy".
- Mixed grill

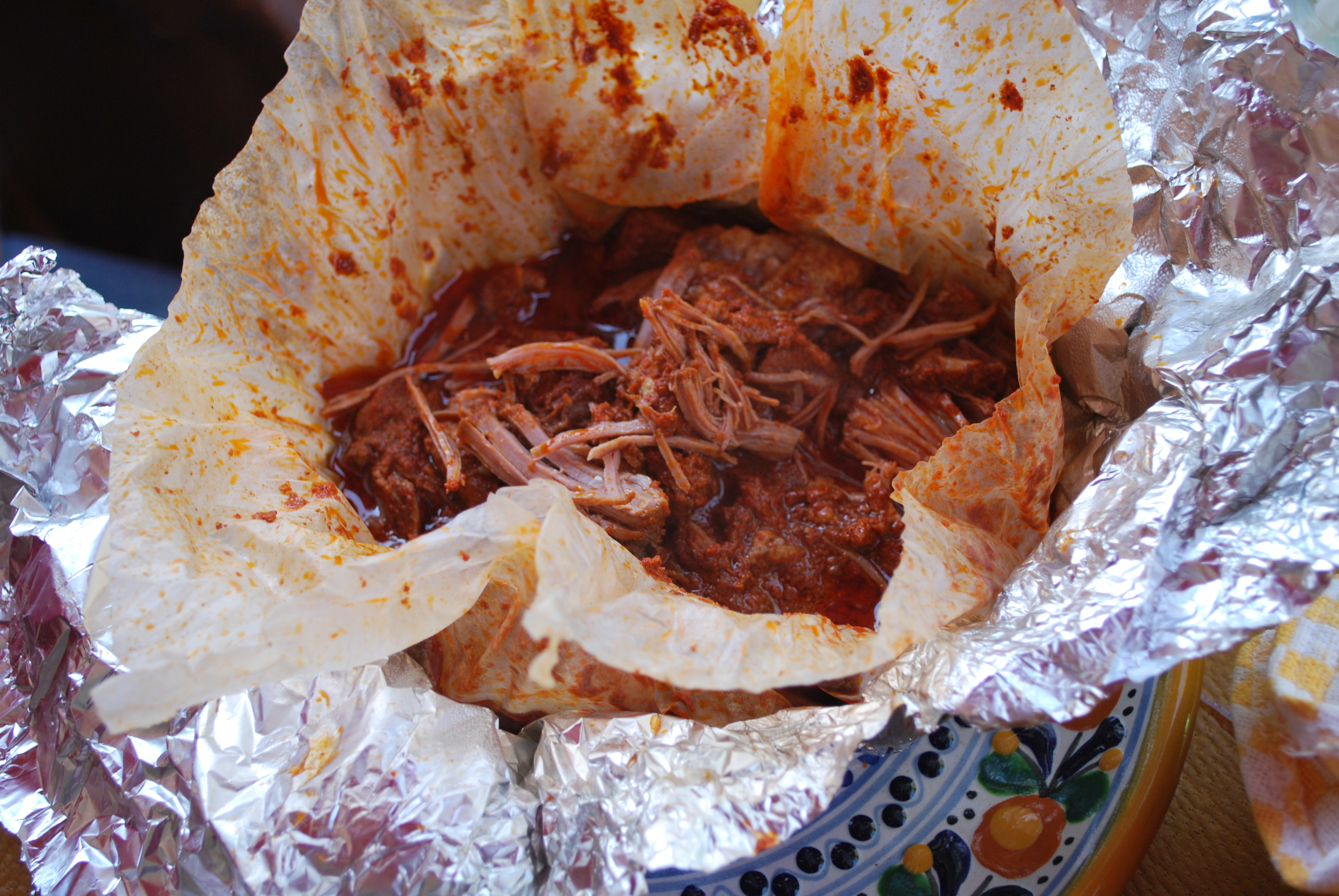
Mixed-meat mixiote

- Mixiote – a traditional pit-barbecued meat dish in central Mexico; especially in the Basin of Mexico. It can also be prepared in an oven. It is usually made with mutton or rabbit, but chicken, lamb, and pork are also used.
- Mykyrokka
- Naryn
- Nem nguội
- Pachamanca
- Pachola
- Pamplona – a grilled stuffed-meat dish from Uruguay prepared with chicken, and may be prepared with other meats such as pork and beef.
- Pastramă – a popular delicatessen meat traditionally in Romania made from lamb and also from pork and mutton
- Peremech
- Pljeskavica
- Po
- Poc Chuc
- Poronkäristys

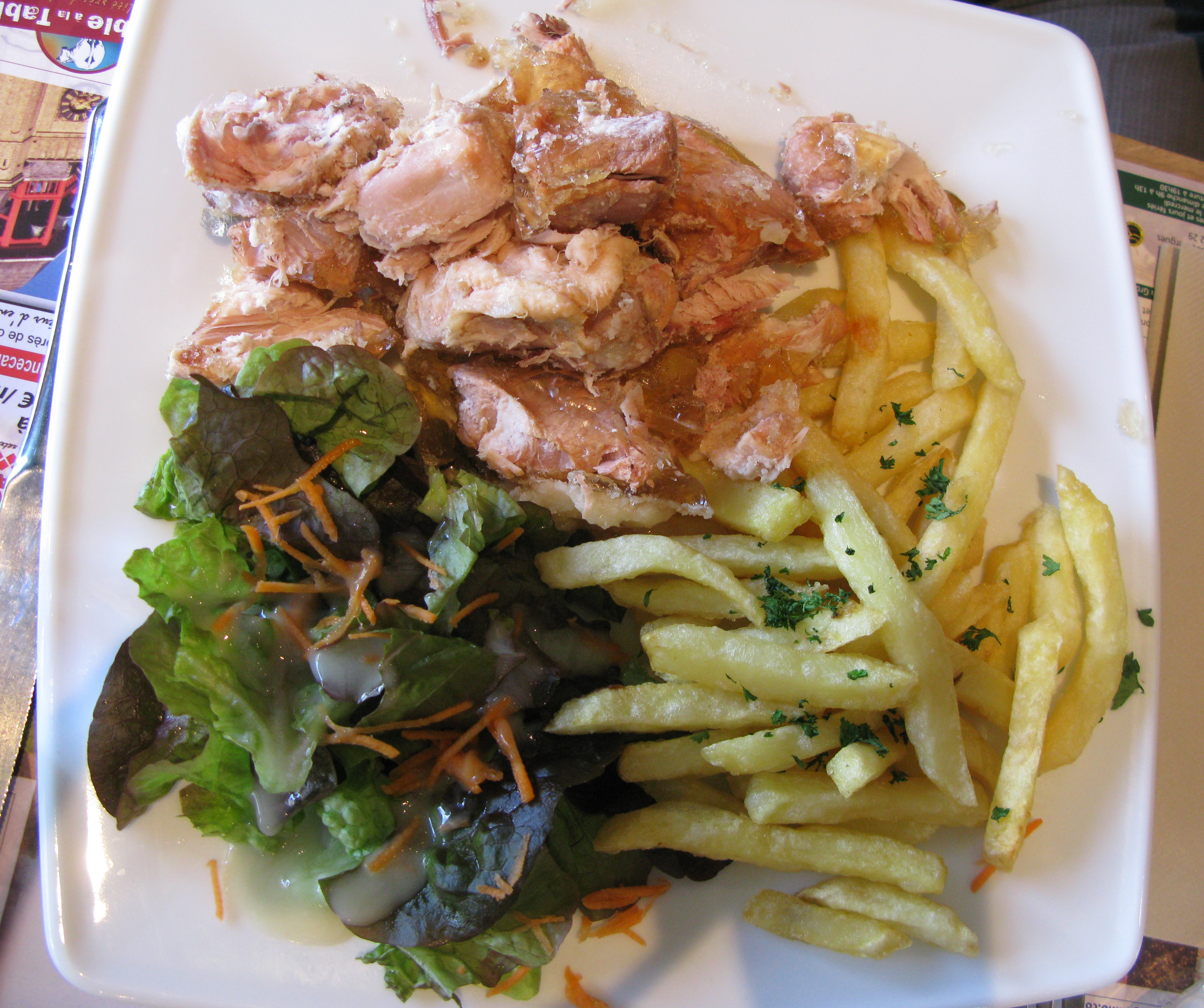
Potjevleesch (at top)

- Potjevleesch – a traditional French Flemish dish, which can be translated into English as "potted meat", it is prepared using three or four different types of meat and held together either with gelatin or natural fats coming from the meats used.
- Poume d'oranges
- Pringá
- Pukala
- Pyttipanna
- Qingtang wanzi
- Rat-on-a-stick – a dish or snack consisting of a roasted rat served on a stick or skewer that is consumed in Thailand and Vietnam. Prior to roasting, the rat is typically skinned and washed, after which it is gutted to remove its internal organs and then roasted.
- Ražnjići
- Renskav
- Riz gras
- Rundstück warm
- Sanjeok

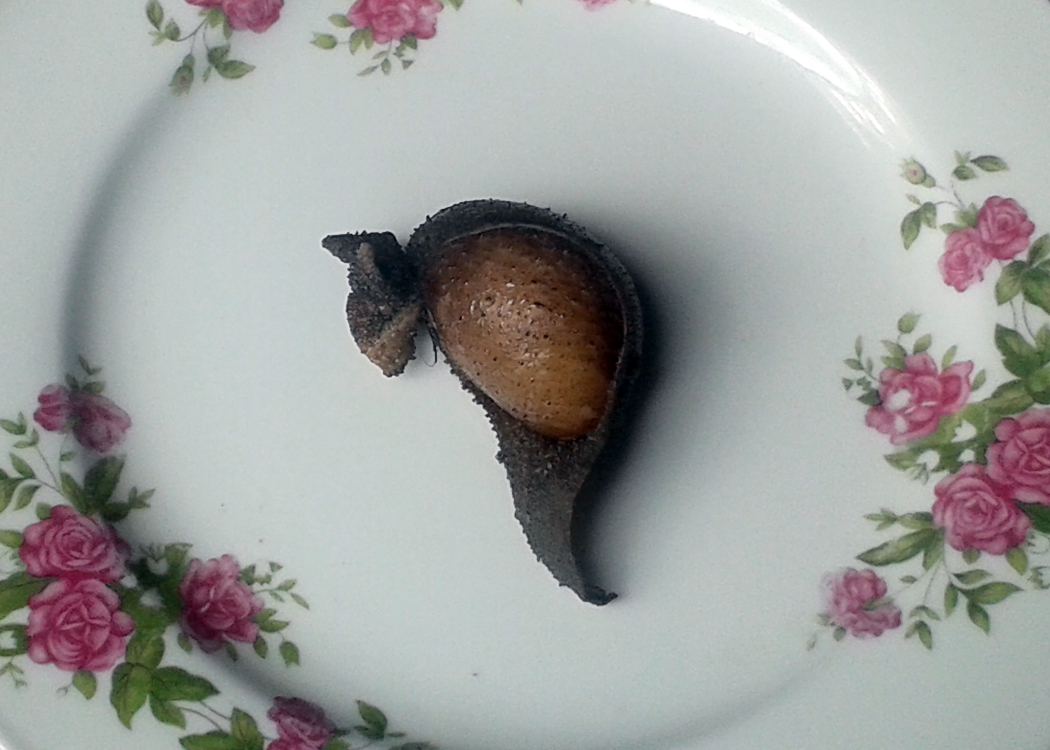
Sapu Mhicha

- Sapu Mhicha – a specialty of the Newari cuisine of the Kathmandu Valley that is prepared during special occasions, it consists of buffalo leaf tripe stuffed with bone marrow that is boiled and fried.
- Saramură
- Sate kambing – the Indonesian name for "mutton satay"
- Satti
- Sauerbraten
- Sautéed reindeer
- Schäufele

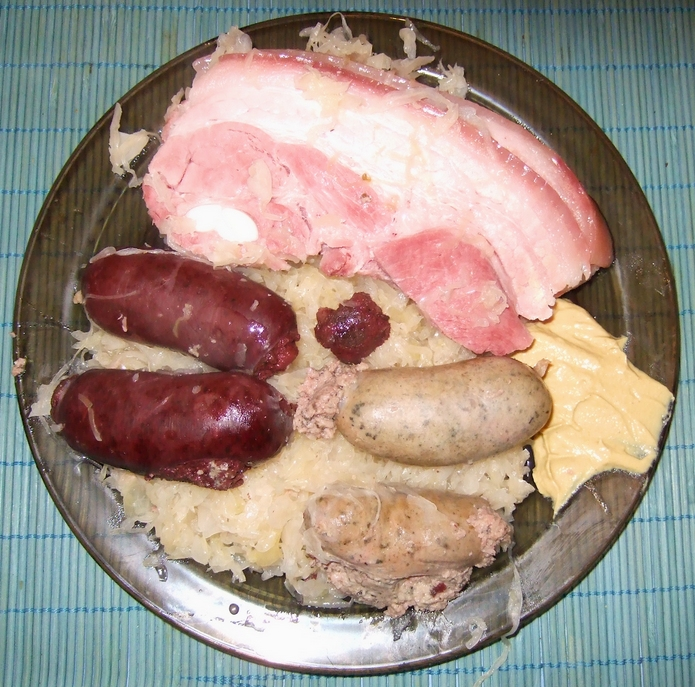
Schlachteplatte

- Schlachteplatte – a hearty German mixed grill dish that primarily consists of boiled pork belly (Kesselfleisch) and freshly cooked Blutwurst and Leberwurst sausages. The cooking process produces sausage juices which, together with any split sausages, are used as a soup known as Metzelsuppe. As a result, in many places, e.g. in parts of the Palatinate, the entire festival and the meal in particular, is known as metzelsupp.
- Seco
- Seswaa – a traditional meat dish of Botswana made of beef and goat meat
- Shaokao
- Shish kebab
- Shuizhu
- Smokie – a West African dish prepared by blowtorching the fleece off the unskinned carcass of an old sheep or goat.
- Souvlaki
- Speckkuchen
- Ssam
- Stew peas
- Suanla chaoshou – a dish in Sichuan cuisine that consists of a spicy sauce over steamed, meat-filled dumplings
- Surf and turf
- Swan Puka
- Tataki
- Teste de Turke
- Toad in the hole – a traditional English dish consisting of sausages in Yorkshire pudding batter, usually served with onion gravy and vegetables. Historically, the dish has also been prepared using other meats, such as rump steak and lamb's kidney.
- Turducken
- Tushonka – a canned stewed meat especially popular in Russia and other countries of the former Eastern Bloc
- Wurstsalat – a German sausage salad
- Xab Momo
- Yakiniku
- Zoervleis – a regional meat dish from the province of Limburg, a region split between Limburg (Netherlands) and Limburg (Belgium), that is typically prepared using horse meat.

== By type ==
=== Beef ===
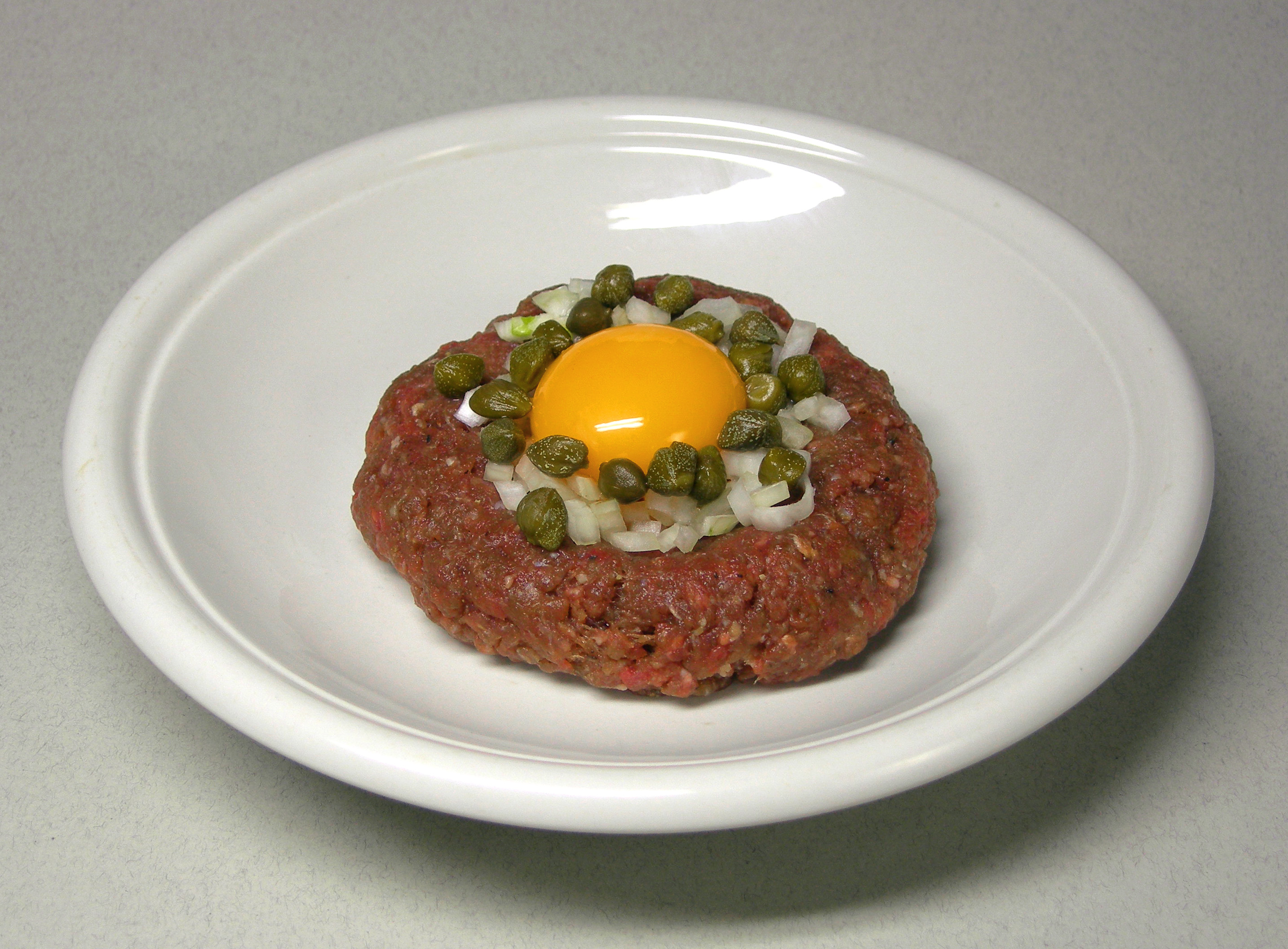
Steak tartare is a meat dish made from finely chopped or minced raw beef.

=== Goat ===
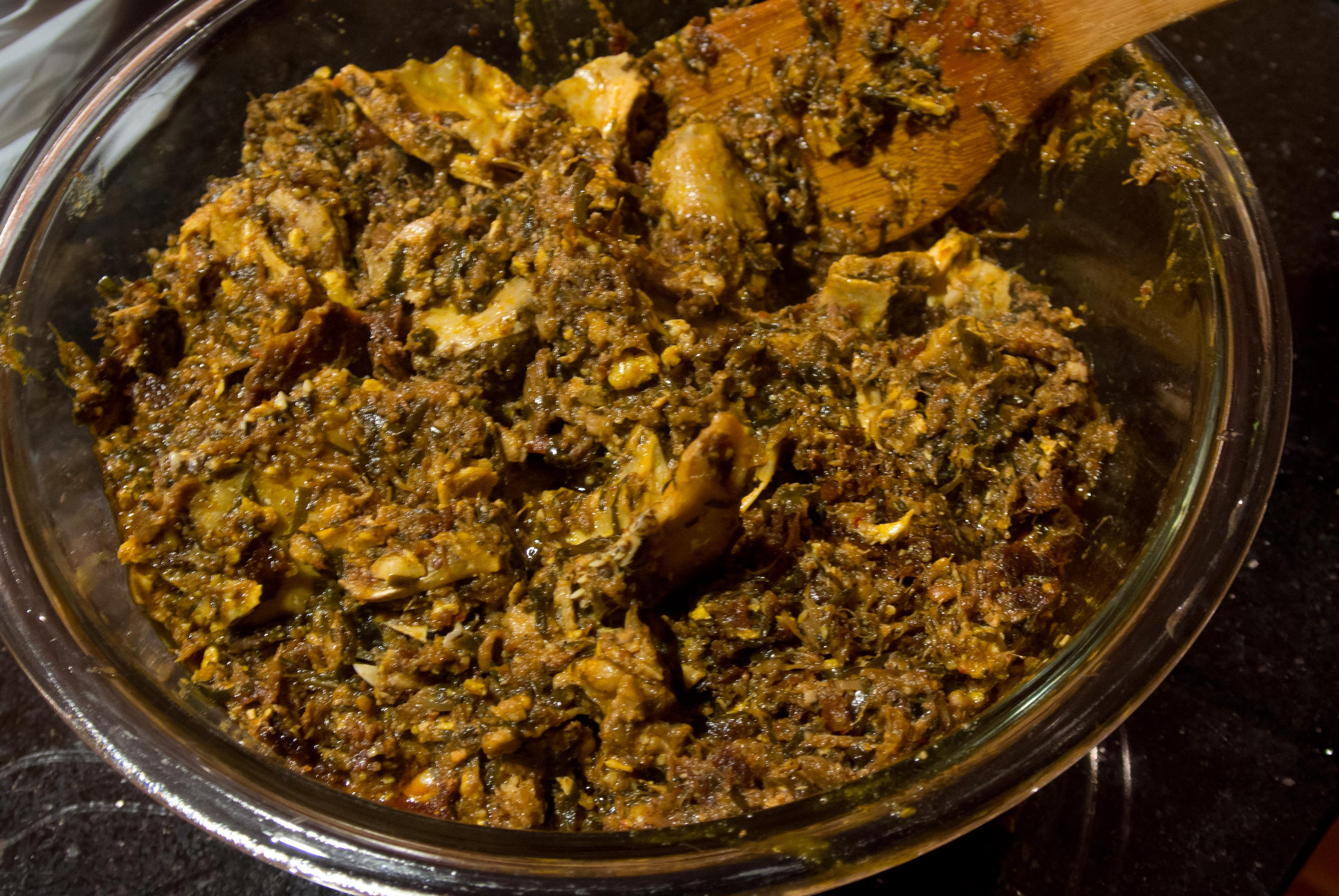
Isi ewu is a goat meat dish prepared using goats heads.

=== Poultry ===
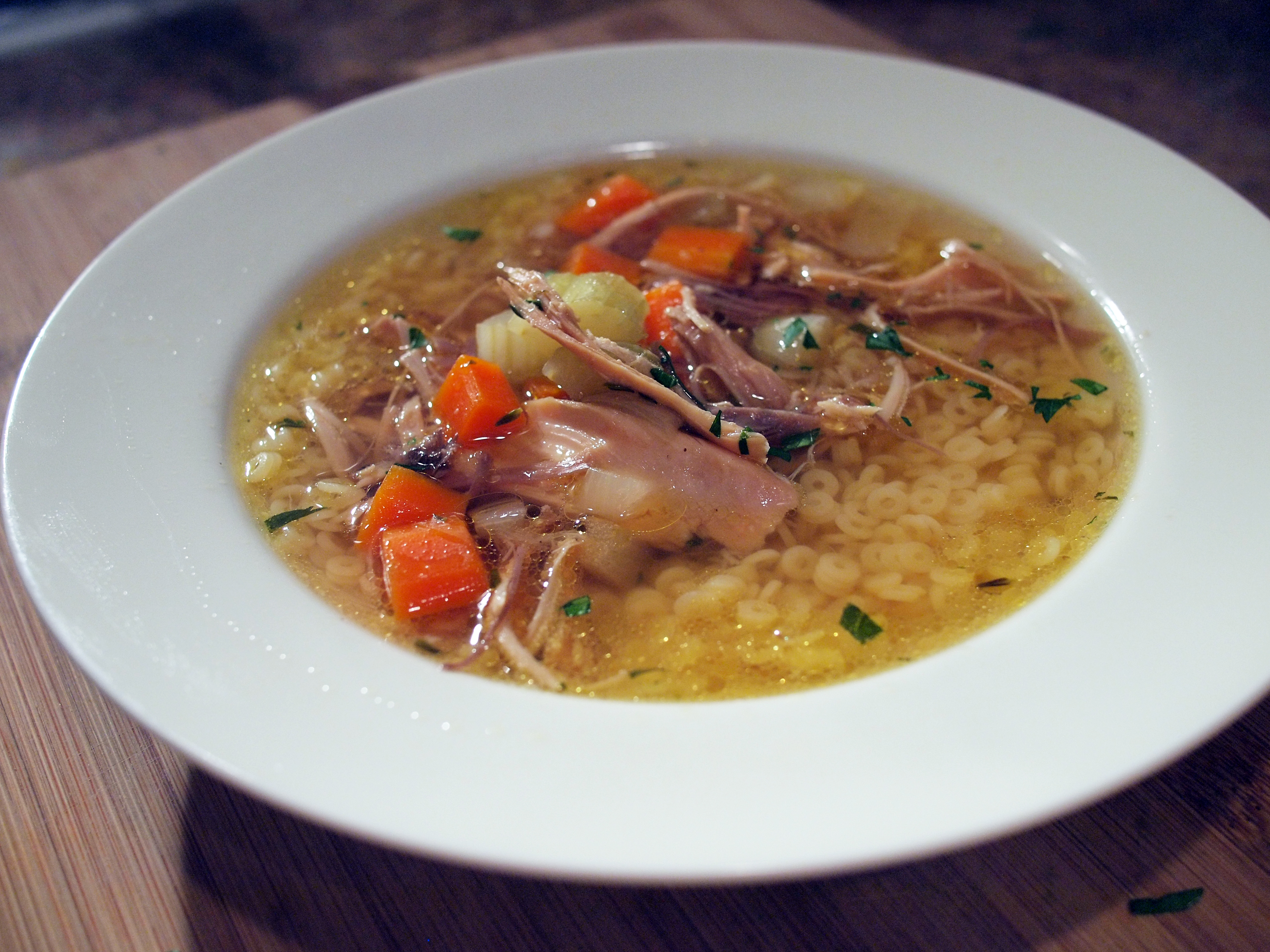
Chicken noodle soup is a chicken dish.

== See also ==
- Meat dishes by country (Category page)
- Barbecue restaurant
- Cultured meat
- List of barbecue dishes
- List of domesticated meat animals
- Lists of foods
- List of kebabs
- List of smoked foods
- List of spit-roasted foods
- Mystery meat
- Patty
- Regional variations of barbecue
