= Sámi cuisine =

Cuisine of peoples from the Sápmi territory of the Sámi people

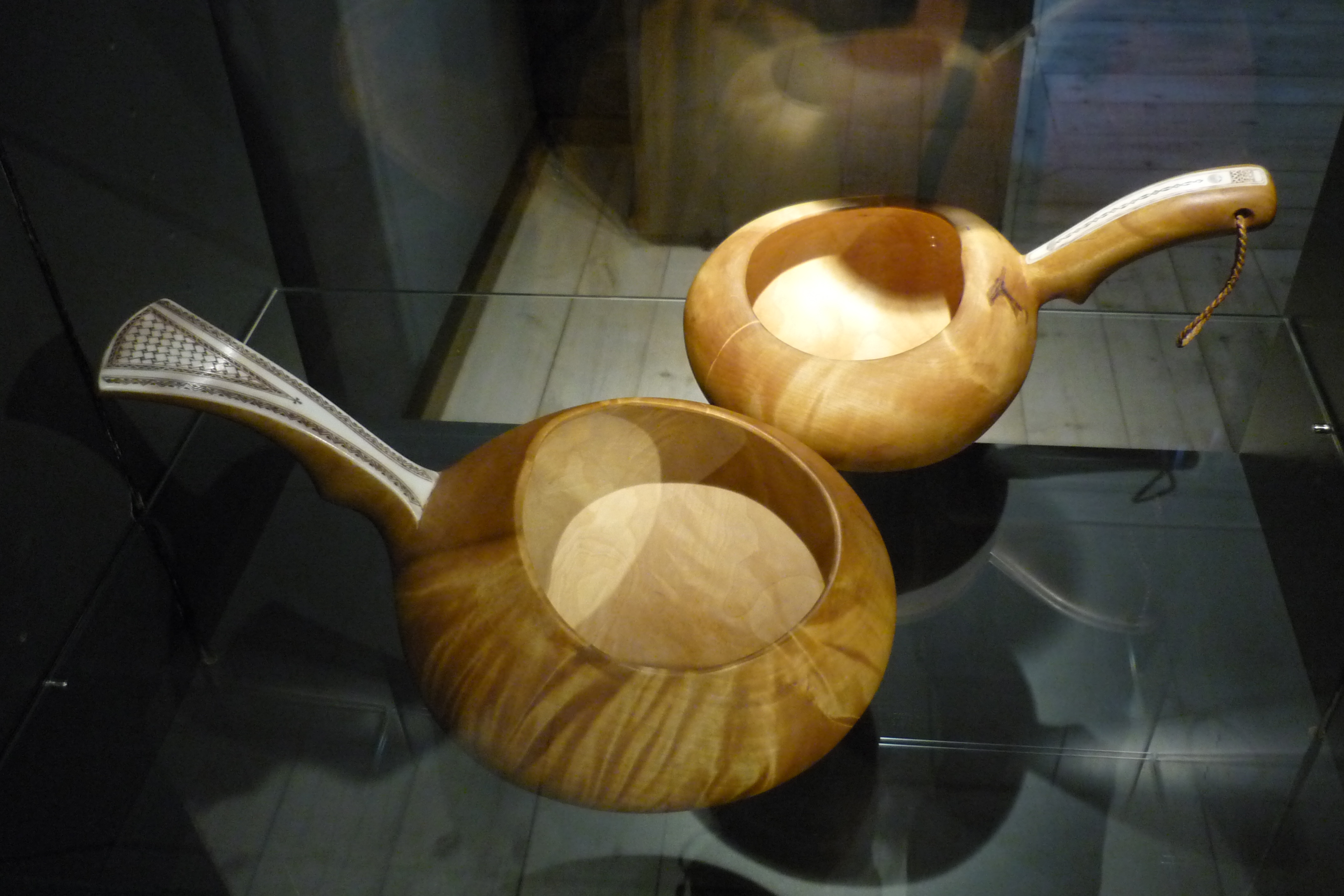
Sámi milking bowls

Sámi cuisine is the cuisine of peoples from the Sápmi territory of the Sámi people, which spans Norway, Sweden, Finland and Russia. Its traditional cuisine of each area has individual traits.

== Staple food ==
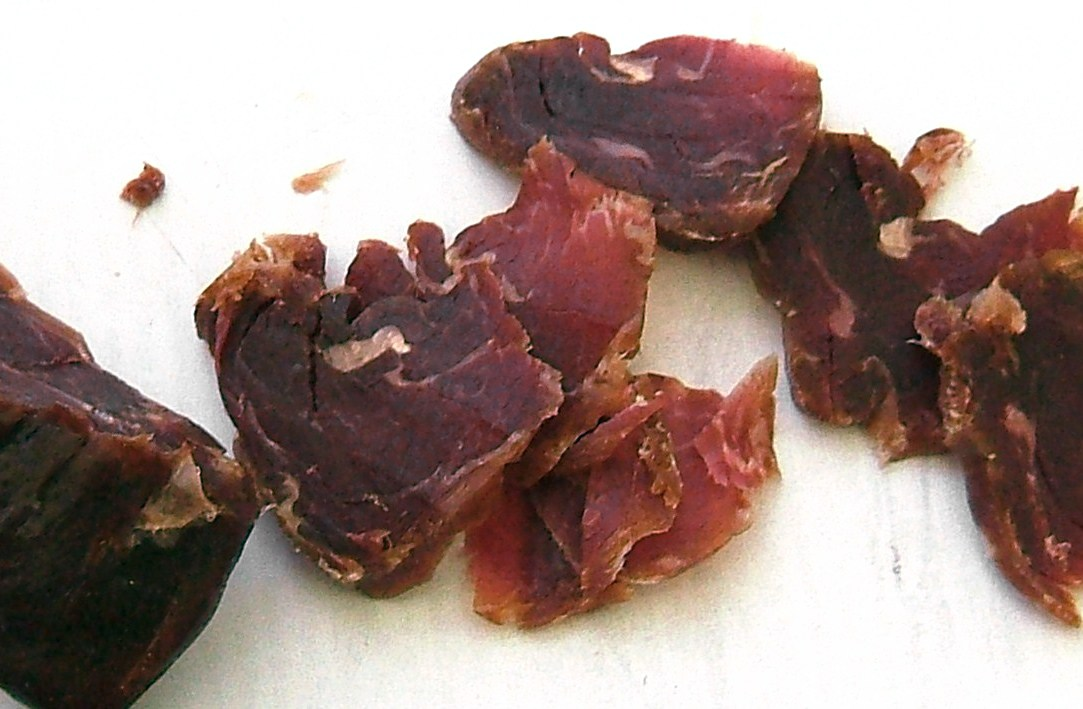
Dried reindeer meat

Traditionally, the cuisine of Sápmi has been based on local materials, like fish, game, reindeer and berries. Berries have been important food, because other kinds of fruits or vegetables were not available during the long winters. Nowadays berries are parts of delicate sauces and desserts. The most valued berry of Sápmi is the cloudberry. Milk consumption varied among groups of Sámi, but was not very common in general.

In eastern parts of Sápmi, reindeer herding became a way of life in the 19th century and, before that, people were hunters and fishers. These days reindeer is essential for Sámi cuisine, but game, fish and wild birds are also important. The cuisine of Sápmi consists of a variety of dishes which stem from differences in geography, culture and climate.

=== Meat dishes ===
Reindeer, fish and game meats are staple foods, with thousands of recipes and flavors, although spices other than salt are very rare. The local cuisine varies a lot, depending on access to food. Sápmi's history with its many cultural influences has led to an array of dishes. Most dishes are made of reindeer meat, although some also are made of moose or sheep. Smoking and drying have historically been used to preserve meat and fish.

=== Fish dishes ===
Fishes in the mountains and forest areas of Sápmi include salmon, common whitefish, perch, roach, and char. Fishes of the coastal areas of Sápmi include cod.

=== New cooking ===
In the last decades, new influences have been introduced in traditional Sámi cooking. A well-known dish of this cross-cooking is the Suovaskebab, which consists of sliced suovasbierggo (smoked meat), cucumber, salad and garlic dressing in a pita bread. The Suovaskebab can be found at festivals and fairs in northern Scandinavia. These days the old food culture is evolving and adapting. Fast food restaurants in Sápmi can have reindeer hamburgers on their menus.

== Gallery ==
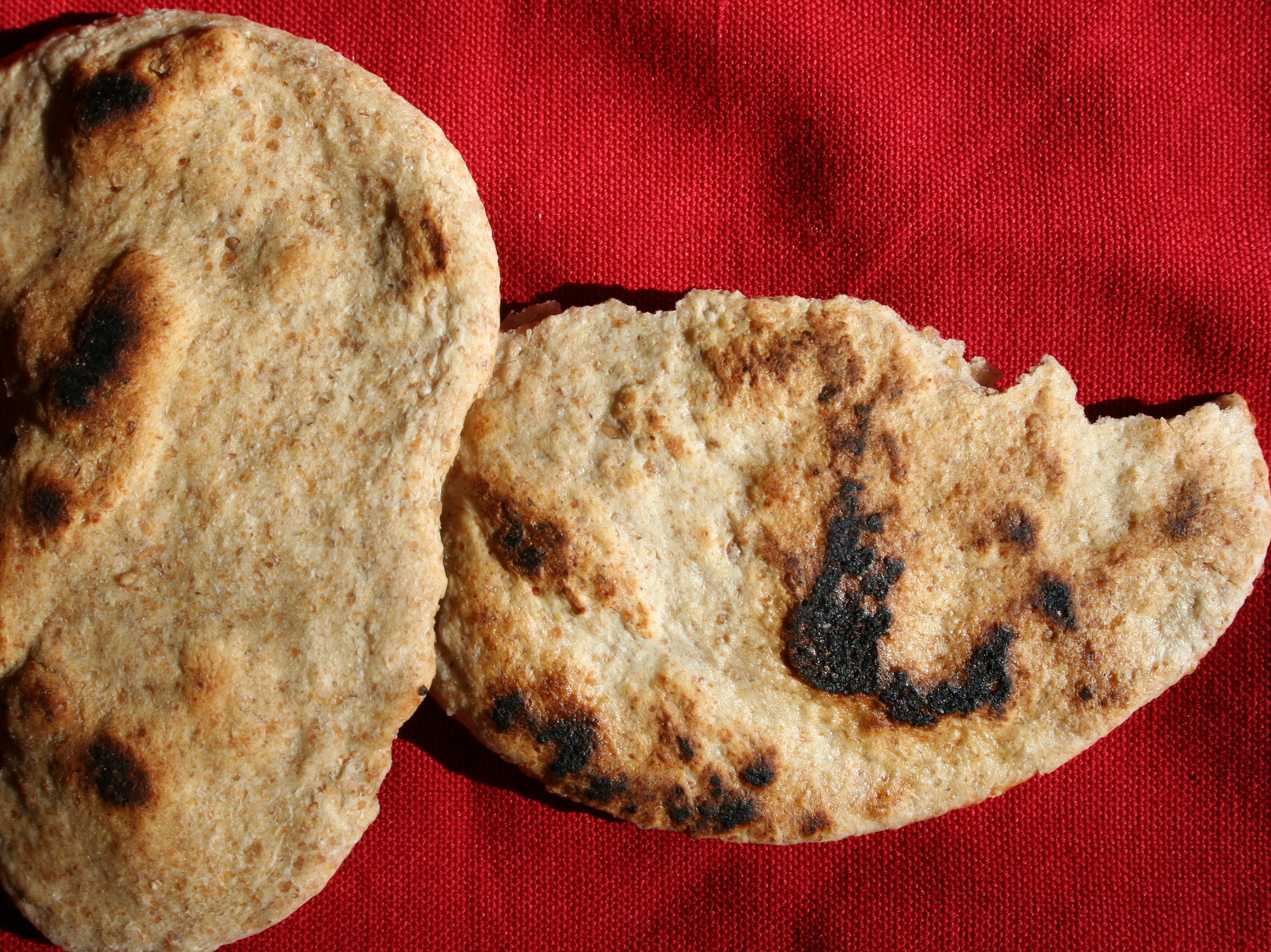
Flatbread

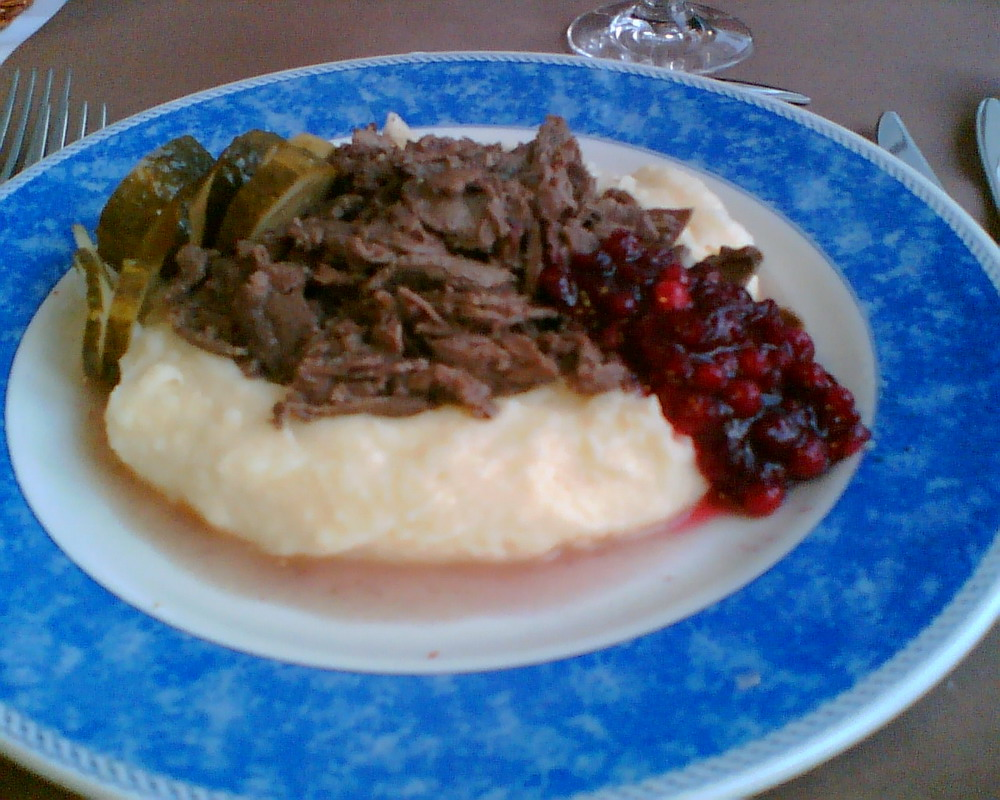
A Finnish version of sauteed reindeer

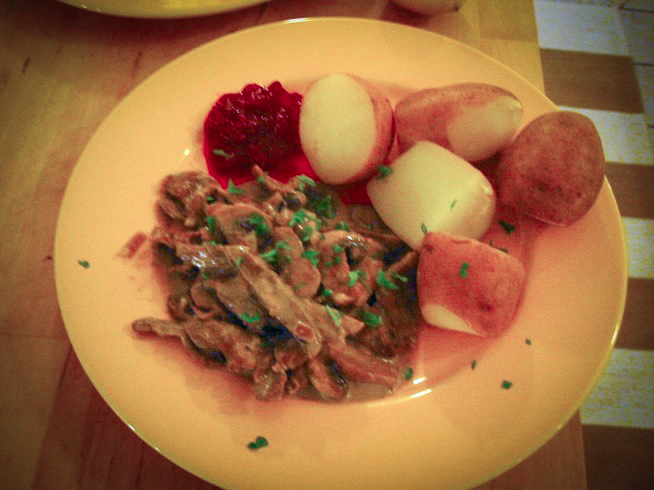
Swedish version

== See also ==
- List of Sami dishes
- Nordic cuisine
