= Doblada =

The term doblada may refer to:

- Doblada, a type of empanada in Chilean cuisine
- Doblada, a type of folded tortilla with filling in Guatemalan cuisine
- Doblada, a folded tortilla covered with salsa in Mexican cuisine
