= List of Sámi dishes =

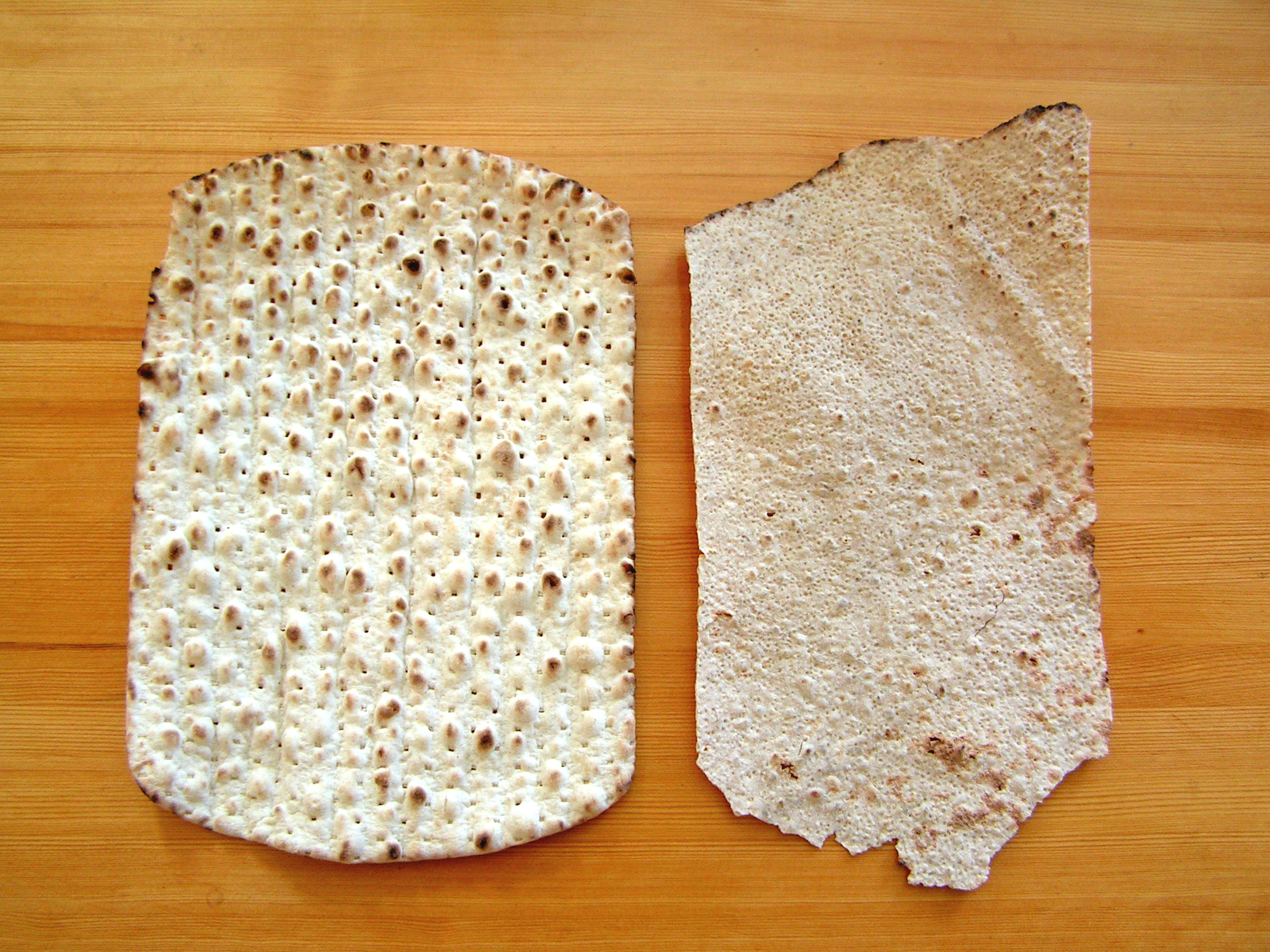
Thinbread from northern Sweden. On the left one made of wheat, rye and yeast. On the right one made of barley and milk.

This is an incomplete list of Sámi dishes and other dishes related to the culture of the Sámi people, which spans Norway, Sweden, Finland and Russia as well.

== Description ==
=== Bread ===
- Gáhkko – Soft flatbread, baked in a frying pan or on a flat stone.
- Gárrpa – Thin, crusty bread.
- Ståmpå – Loaf

=== Desserts ===
- Cloudberries – Eaten both fresh and as jam. Cloudberry jam goes well warm with ice cream.
- Coffee with leipäjuusto
- Guompa – angelica mixed with milk and left in barrels to ferment.
- Gumppus – Blood cakes and blood sausages boiled with potatoes and meat.
- Jåbmå – Leaves of Mountain sorrel cooked to a stew, usually served with sugar and milk.

=== Fish dishes ===
- Dried fish of different kinds
- Guollemales – Cooked fish of any kind.
- Sállteguolle – Salted fish, either gravsalted or heavy salted.
- Suovasguolle – Smoked fish

=== Meat dishes ===
- Bierggomales – Cooked meat of various kind, chops and sides are common. Also tongue, marrow bones, liver are a part of the Sami cuisine. The dish is more like a five-course dinner, with various parts served in order with hot broth straight from the pot.
- Bierggojubttsa – A soup containing meat, potatoes, carrots or other root vegetables.
- Guorppa – A kind of sausage made of minced meat wrapped in caul (omentum).
- Gåjkkebierggo – Dried meat, eaten as it is or in soup with potato and rice.
- Mallemárffe – Blood sausage
- Sautéed reindeer
- Slåbbå – Blood pancakes
- Suovasbierggo – Smoked meat, eaten as it is or fried
- Smoked reindeer

== See also ==
- Sami cuisine
