= Zoervleis =

Regional meat dish in Europe

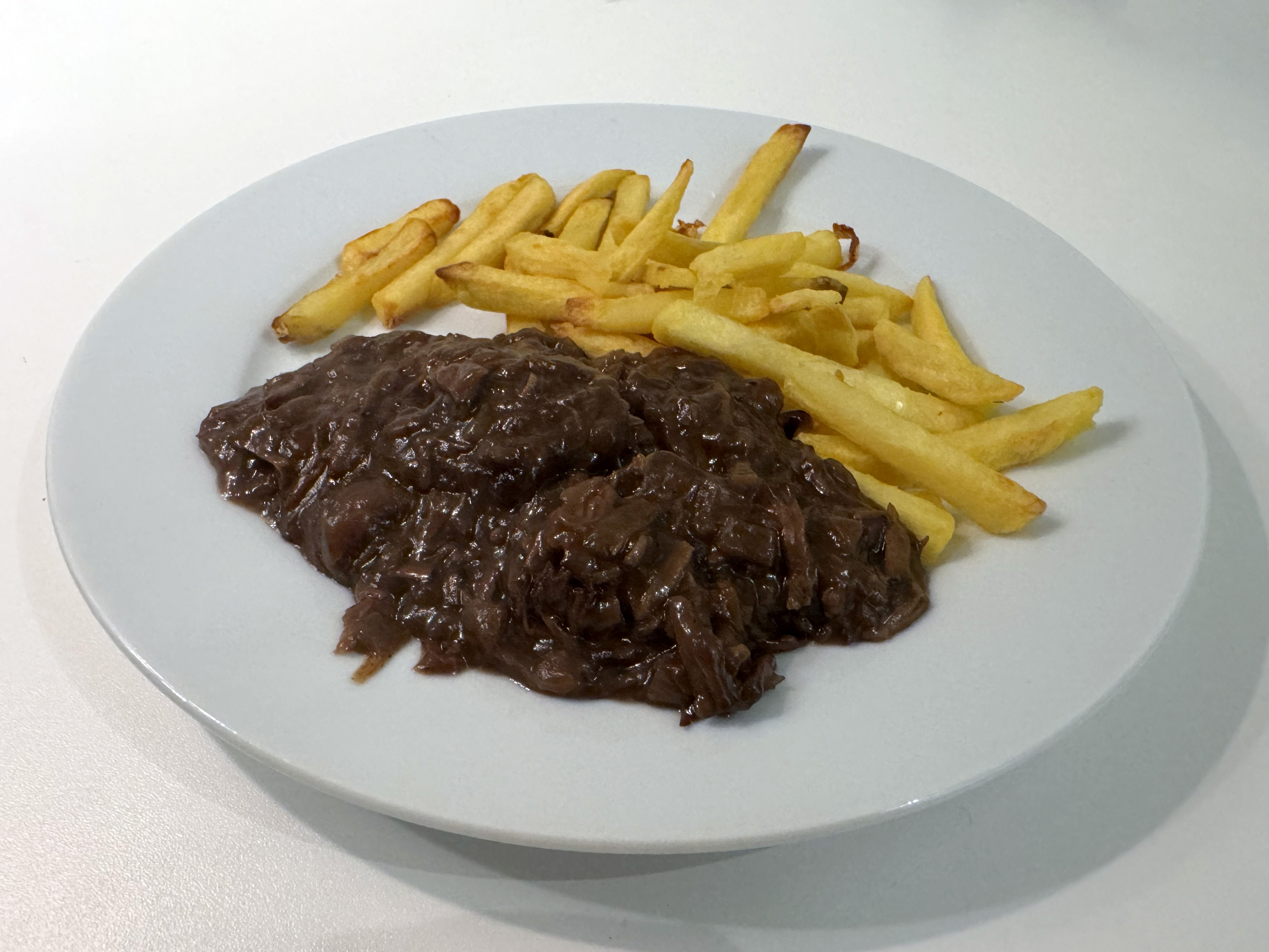
- Type: Stew
- Place of origin: Belgium and Netherlands
- Region or state: Province of Limburg
- Main ingredients: Meat (horse meat or beef), vinegar, apple butter, gingerbread

Zoervleis or Zoervleesj (Limburgian for sour meat, in Dutch: Zuurvlees) is a regional meat dish from the Province of Limburg, a province that exists in both the Netherlands and Belgium.

Zoervleis is similar to carbonade flamande and hachee and Germans might know it as Sauerbraten in some local variations. The sour refers to a process of marinating the meat, traditionally horse meat but nowadays commonly beef, in vinegar. However, despite its name the dish is sweet due to the vinegar being compensated for with apple butter and Dutch gingerbread.

The dish is often accompanied by French fries when served in snackbars or cafes. As a dish cooked at home, zoervleisj is often eaten with potatoes and vegetables, or with stamppot.

== See also ==
- List of meat dishes
- List of stews
- Sauerbraten
