= Schlachteplatte =

German meat dish

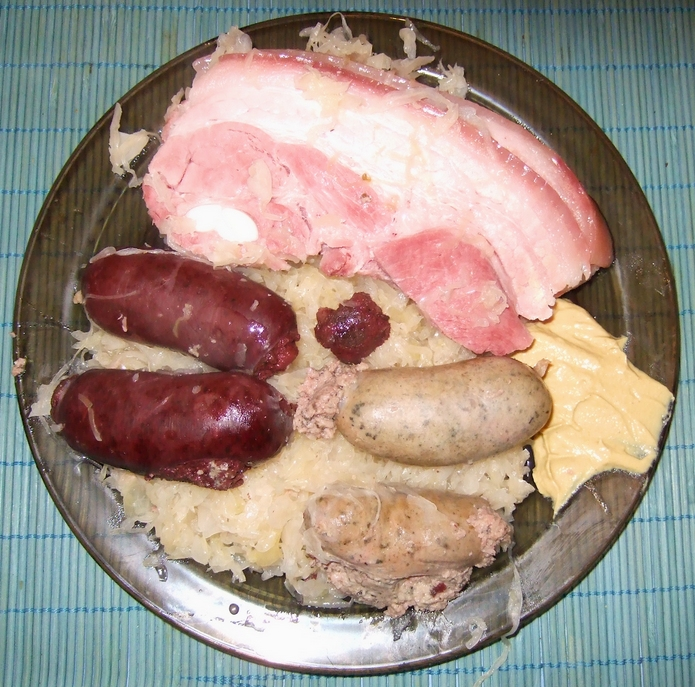
Schlachteplatte

A Schlachteplatte, Schlachtplatte, Schlachtschüssel (Southern German), or Metzgete (Swiss and southwestern part of Baden-Württemberg in Germany) is a hearty German dish that primarily consists of boiled pork belly (Kesselfleisch) and freshly cooked Blutwurst and Leberwurst sausages. The cooking process produces sausage juices which, together with any split sausages, are used as a soup known as Metzelsuppe. As a result, in many places, e.g., in parts of the Palatinate, the entire festival and the meal in particular are known as Metzelsupp.

Common accompaniments to a Schlachtplatte are sauerkraut and bread or potatoes or, in South Germany, potato pancakes (Dotsch or Reiberdatschi). Other elements might be fresh Bratwurst and Mettwurst or raw, spiced bratwurst filling. In Rhinehessen it is also common to enrich the dish with a sauce from part of the pig's blood (Schweinepfeffer or Schwarz Brie).

The word is derived from schlachten, "to slaughter", and Platte, "dish", because, traditionally, it is only eaten on the day of slaughter; before the invention of refrigerators, blood and sensitive organs, like liver, had to be prepared straight away. Meat which did not have to be consumed immediately was preserved by salting, drying and smoking. The slaughtering day offered a rare opportunity to eat fresh meat which explains why the Schlachtplatte is a rather lavish meal.

Originally these slaughtering days took place mainly in the autumn. This meant that not so many animals had to be fed over the winter, so the meat could be preserved for longer in the cooler temperatures and the farmers had more time after the last harvest for turning it into ham and sausages which could then be smoked over the winter hearth fire.

== See also ==
- Berner Platte – a similar dish
- Choucroute garnie – a similar French dish
- List of meat dishes
