= Pork belly =

Boneless, fatty cut of meat from a pig's belly

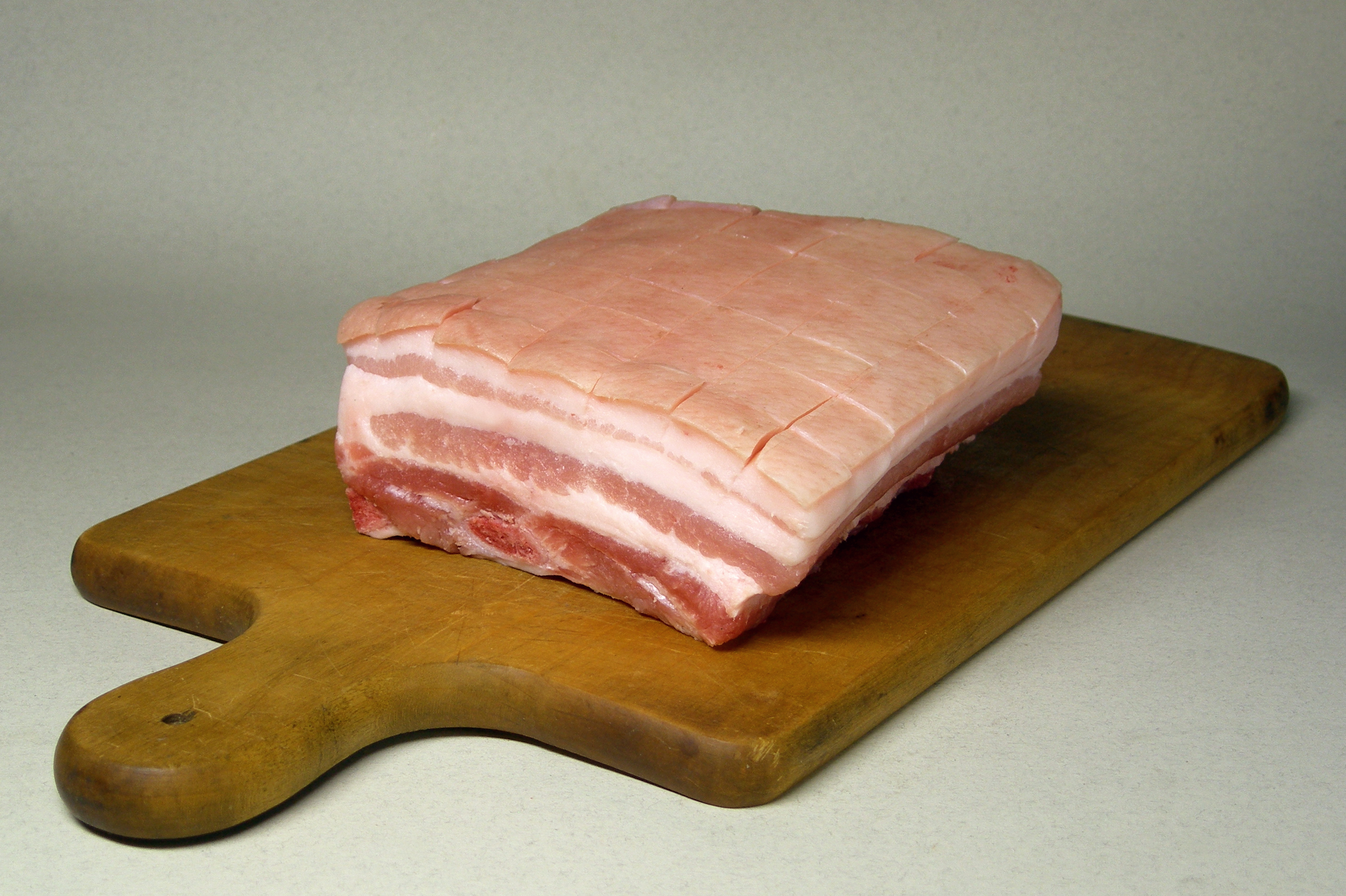
- Uncooked pork belly

Nutritional value per 100 grams (3.5 oz)
- Energy: 2,167 kJ (518 kcal)
- Carbohydrates: 0 g
- Fat: 53 g
- Protein: 9.34 g

Pork belly or belly pork is a boneless, fatty primal cut of pork from the belly of a pig. Pork belly is popular in many cuisines, including American, British, Swedish, Danish, Norwegian, Hungarian, Croatian, Serbian, Ukrainian, Polish, Czech, Hispanic, Filipino, Chinese, Korean, Vietnamese, and Thai.

== Regional dishes ==
=== France ===
In Alsatian cuisine, pork belly is prepared as choucroute garnie.

=== China ===
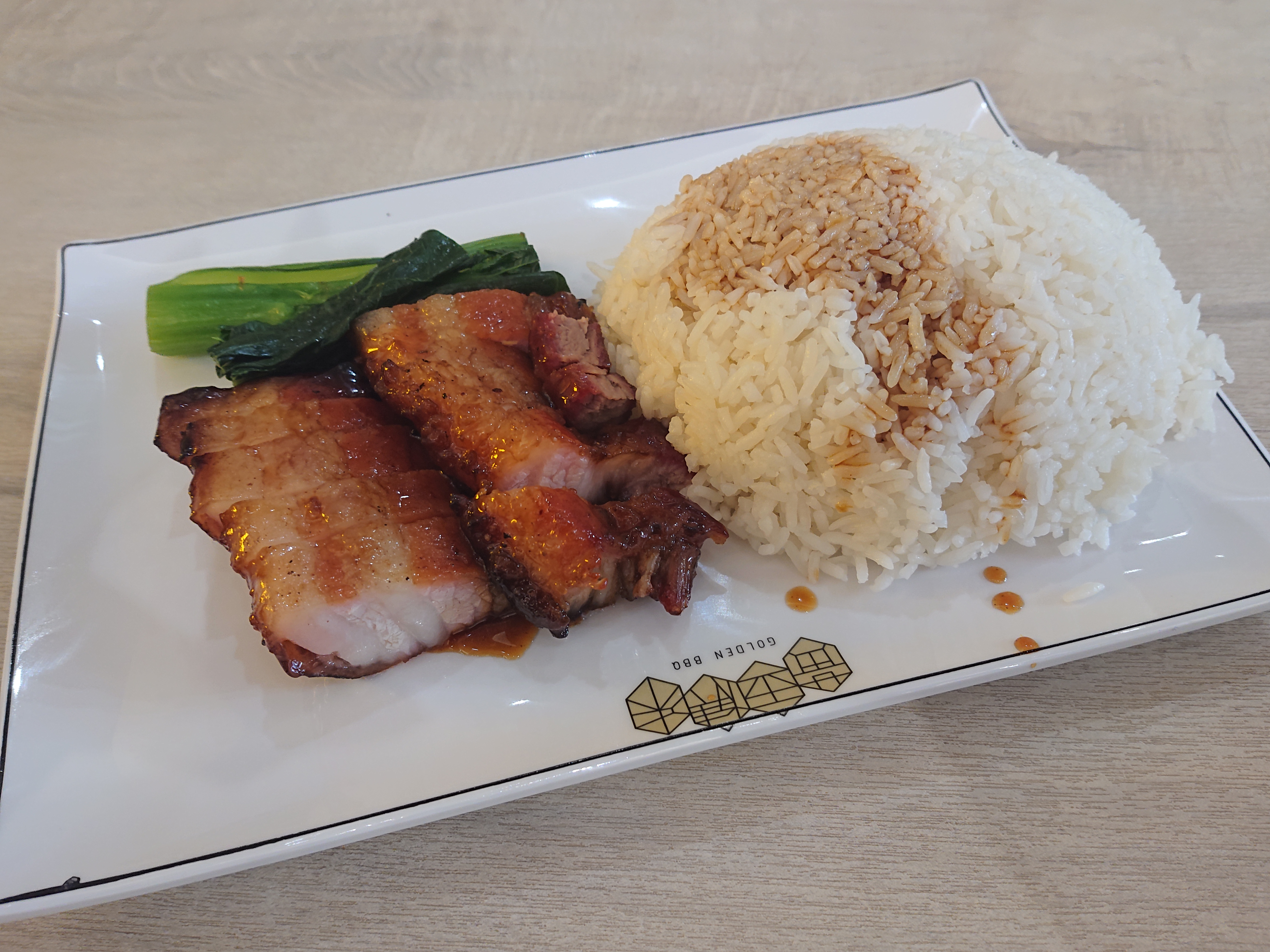
Pork belly char siu with rice

In Chinese cuisine, pork belly (Chinese: 五花肉; pinyin: wǔhuāròu) is most often prepared by dicing and slowly braising with skin on, marination, or being cooked in its entirety. Pork belly is used to make red braised pork belly (紅燒肉) and Dongpo pork (東坡肉) in China (sweet and sour pork is made with pork fillet).

In Guangdong, a variant called crispy pork belly (脆皮燒肉) is also popular. The pork is cooked and grilled for a crispy skin. Pork belly is also one of the common meats used in char siu.

=== Latin American and Caribbean ===
In Dominican, Colombian, Venezuelan, and Puerto Rican cuisine, pork belly strips are fried and served as part of bandeja paisa surtido (chicharrón).

In Venezuela, it is known as tocineta, not to be confused with chicharrón (pork skins) (although the arepa de chicharrón uses fried pork belly instead of skins). Local tradition uses tocineta as one of the fillings of traditional ham bread (pan de jamón), and some use it for the typical hallacas.

=== Denmark ===
In traditional Danish cuisine, whole pork belly is prepared as flæskesteg (literally 'pork roast'), traditionally eaten during Christmas. The dish is called ribbenssteg (literally 'rib roast') when prepared from pork belly. It is typically oven roasted with the skin on, seasoned with salt and bay leaves. The skin turns into a crispy rind, which is eaten with the meat. Prepared in individual slices as stegt flæsk, it is the national dish of Denmark.

=== Germany ===
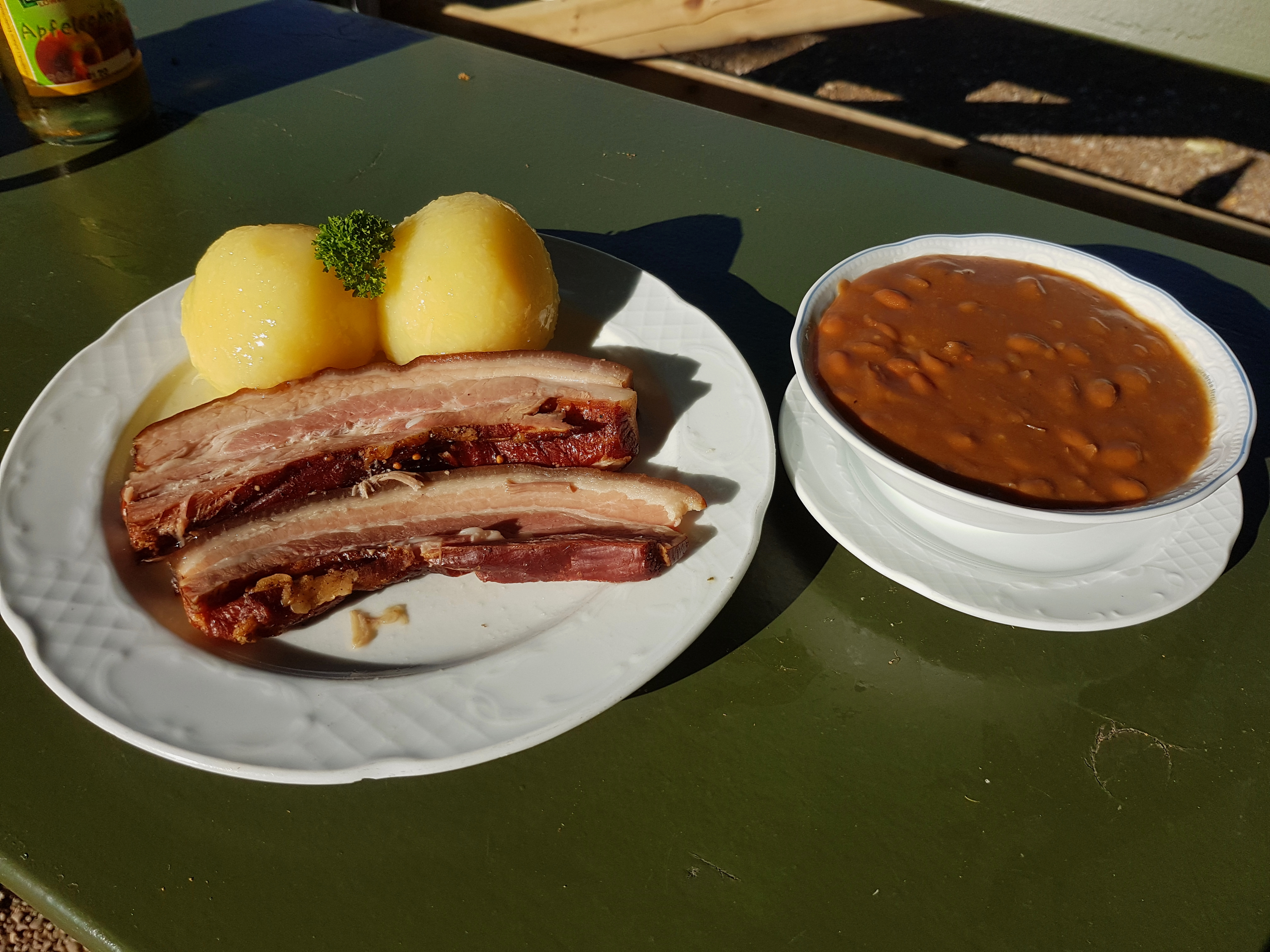
Smoked pork belly from Germany with beans and dumplings

In German cuisine, pork belly is used as an ingredient in schlachtplatte.

=== Italy ===
In Italian cuisine, pancetta derives from pork belly.

=== Korea ===
- Three-layered flesh
- Hangul: 삼겹살
- Hanja: 三겹살
- RR: samgyeopsal
- MR: samgyŏpsal
- IPA: [sam.ɡjʌp̚.s͈al]

Five-layered flesh
- Hangul: 오겹살
- Hanja: 五겹살
- RR: ogyeopsal
- MR: ogyŏpsal
- IPA: [o.ɡjʌp̚.s͈al]

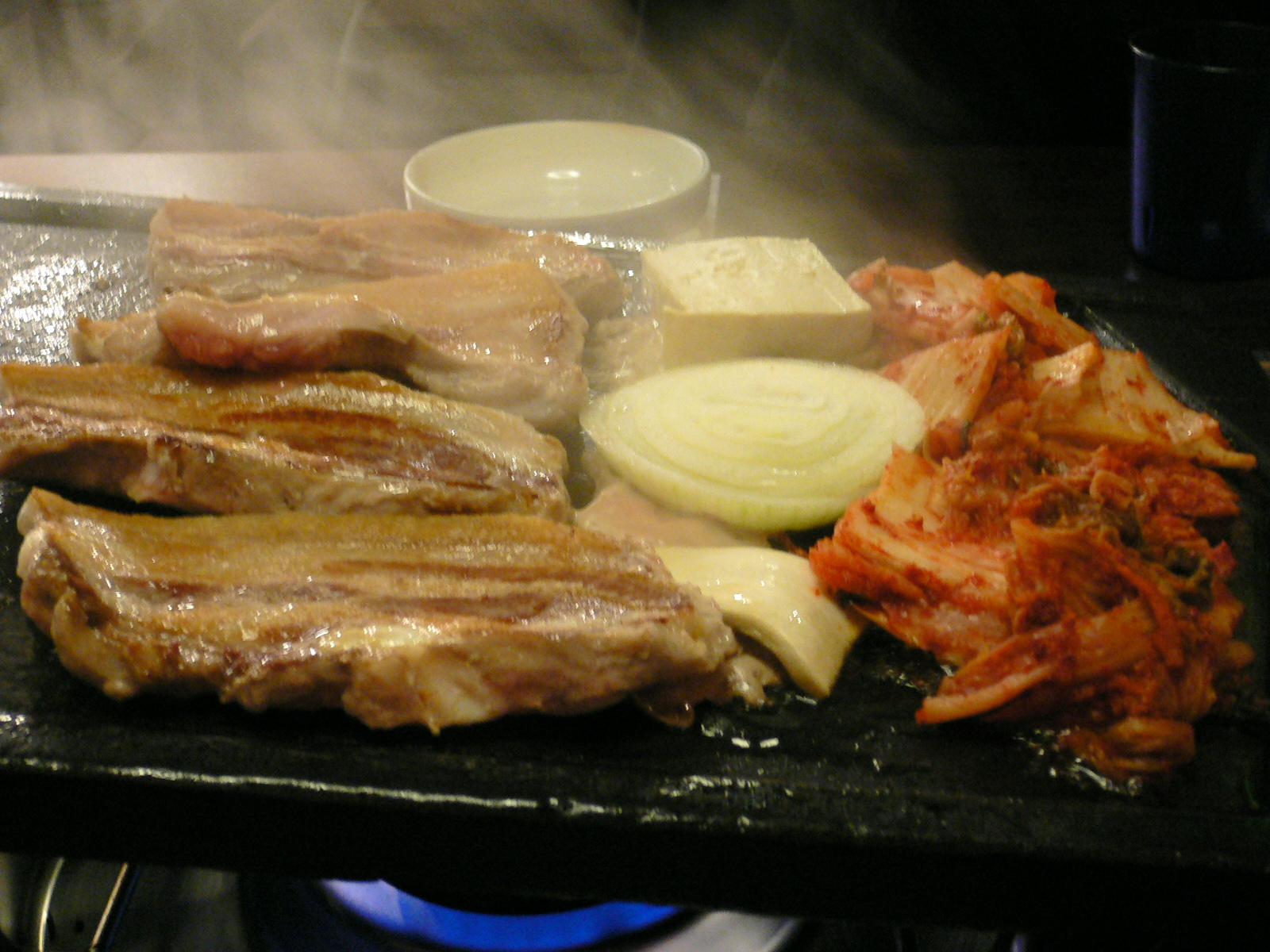
Cooked samgyeopsal slices with kimchi

In Korean cuisine, pork belly with the skin removed is known as samgyeop-sal (삼겹살), while pork belly with the skin on is known as ogyeop-sal (오겹살). The literal meaning of samgyeop-sal is 'three-layered meat' as sam (Korean: 삼; Hanja: 三) means 'three', gyeop (겹) means 'layer', and sal (살) means 'flesh', referring to what appears to be three layers that are visible in the meat. The word o (오; 五) in ogyeop-sal means 'five', referring to the five-layered pork belly meat with the skin.

According to a 2006 survey by National Agricultural Cooperative Federation, 85% of South Korean adults stated that they prefer pork belly; 70% of those surveyed recipients ate the meat at least once a week. The high popularity of pork belly makes it one of the most expensive parts of pork.

South Korea imports wholesale pork belly from Austria, Belgium, Canada, Chile, Denmark, France, Germany, Ireland, The Netherlands, Spain and US for price stabilisation, as imported pork is much cheaper than domestic. The South Korean government planned to import 70,000 tons of pork belly with no tariff in the second half of 2011.

Pork belly is consumed both at restaurants and home, grilled at Korean barbecue, or used as an ingredient for many Korean dishes, such as bossam (boiled pork wraps) and kimchi-jjigae (kimchi stew).

Samgyeop-sal-gui (삼겹살구이) or ogyeop-sal-gui (오겹살구이) refers to the gui (grilled dish) of pork belly. Often, in common language, the "-gui" (구이) is omitted, instead simply using the name of the meat for the dish itself. Slices of pork belly meat are usually grilled, not marinated or seasoned. It is often marinated with garlic and accompanied by soju. Usually, diners grill the meat themselves and eat directly from a grill. It is typically served with ssamjang (wrap sauce) and ssam (wrap) vegetables such as lettuce and perilla leaves to wrap it in.

=== Netherlands ===
In the Netherlands the Zeeuws spek is very popular, as is the speklap (slowly baked pork belt).

=== Norway ===
In Norwegian cuisine, pork belly is eaten by 55% of the population for Christmas dinner as of 2014. The tradition is to cook it slowly in the oven with the skin on and serve it accompanied by potatoes, medisterkake (pork meatballs similar to frikadeller), sausages, and lingonberry jam, as well as stewed cabbage (surkål), comparable to sauerkraut. The crispiness of the pork rind is considered vital to the pork belly.

=== Okinawa, Japan ===
In Okinawan cuisine, rafute is traditionally eaten for longevity.

=== Philippines ===
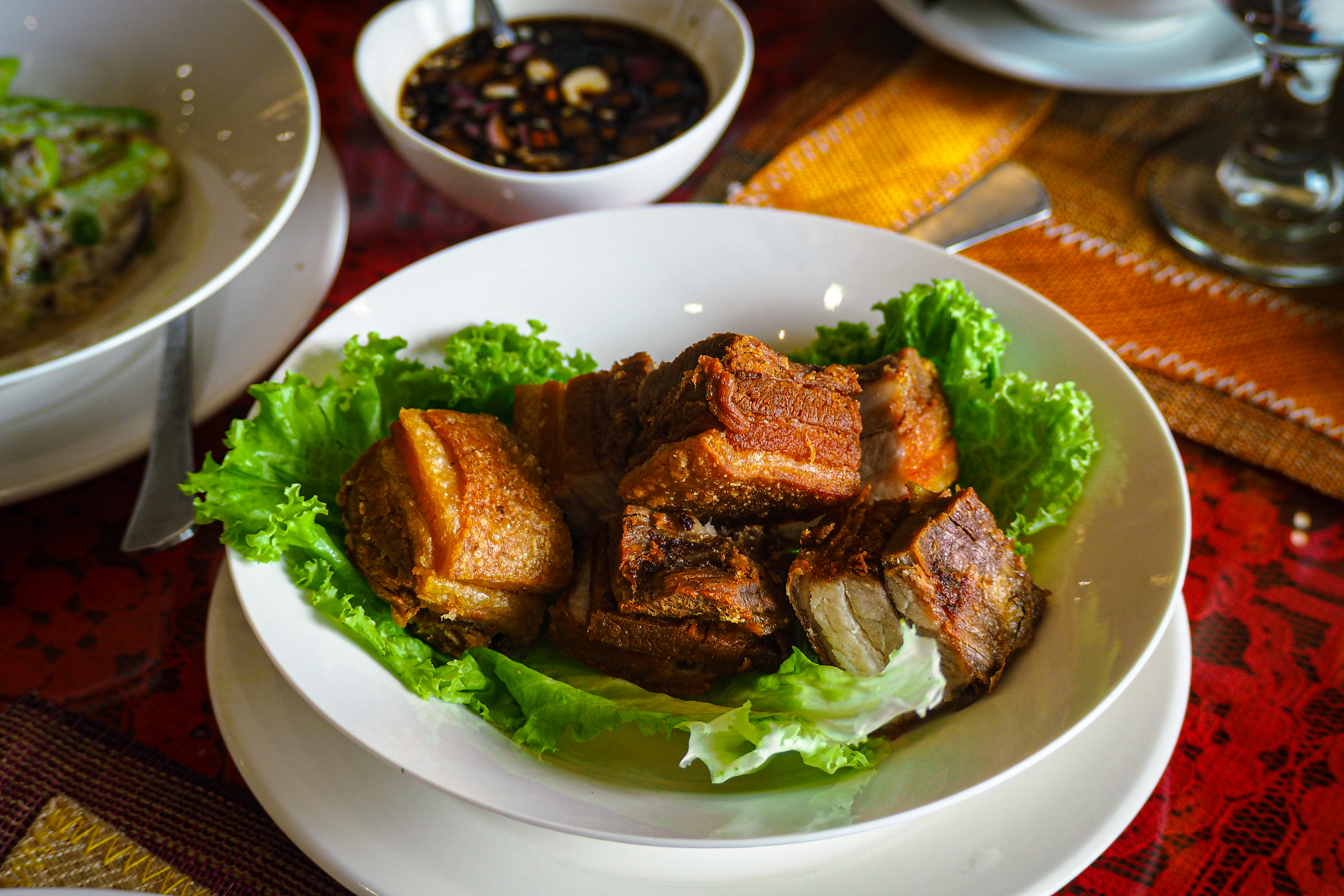
Litsong kawali, a Filipino dish consisting of deep-fried pork belly

In Filipino cuisine, pork belly (Tagalog: liyempo; Philippine Spanish: liempo) is marinated in a mixture of crushed garlic, vinegar, salt, and pepper before being grilled. It is then served with soy sauce and vinegar (toyo't suka) or vinegar with garlic (bawang at suka). This method of preparing pork is called inihaw in Filipino and sinugba in Cebuano. Being seasoned, deep-fried, and served by being chopped into pieces is called lechon kawali.

=== Switzerland ===
In Swiss cuisine, pork belly is used as an ingredient in the Berner Platte.

=== Thailand ===
In Thai cuisine, pork belly is called mu sam chan (หมูสามชั้น; lit: 'three-layered pork') refers to rind, fat and meat, often used to make Khao mu daeng and Khao mu krop, or fried with kale.

=== United Kingdom ===
In British cuisine, pork belly is primarily cooked using two methods. For slow roast pork belly, the meat is baked at a moderate temperature for up to three hours to tenderize it, coupled with periods of approximately twenty minutes at a high temperature at the beginning or end of the cooking period to harden off the rind or "crackling". For a barbecued pork belly, the meat is seasoned and slow-cooked in a pan by indirect heat on a covered barbecue, on a bed of mixed vegetables to which (hard) cider is added. Heat is again varied to produce tender meat with hard crackling. Pork belly is also used in the UK to make streaky bacon.

=== United States ===
In American cuisine, bacon is most often made from pork bellies. Salt pork is also made from pork bellies, which is commonly used for making soups and stews.

== Futures ==
The pork belly futures contract became an icon of futures and commodities trading. It is frequently used as an example of commodities in general and appears in several depictions of the arena in popular entertainment, such as the 1983 film Trading Places. Inaugurated on August 18, 1961, on the Chicago Mercantile Exchange (CME), frozen pork belly futures were developed as a risk management device to meet the needs of meat packers who processed pork and had to contend with volatile hog prices, as well as price risks on processed products held in inventory.

In more recent years, pork belly futures' prominence declined; eventually, they were among the least-traded contracts on the CME and were delisted for trading on July 18, 2011.

In the Discworld book series by Terry Pratchett, there is a pork futures warehouse that contains pork in various stages of existence.

== See also ==
- Pancetta – Italian bacon made of pork belly meat
- Rafute – Pork rib dish in the Okinawan cuisine
- Rullepølse – Traditional Danish spiced cold cut meat roll
- Samgyeopsal – Korean grilled pork belly dish
- Bacon – Type of salt-cured pork
- Korean barbecue – Regional style of food preparation
- Korean cuisine
- List of pork dishes
