= Khao mu daeng =

Thai rice and pork dish

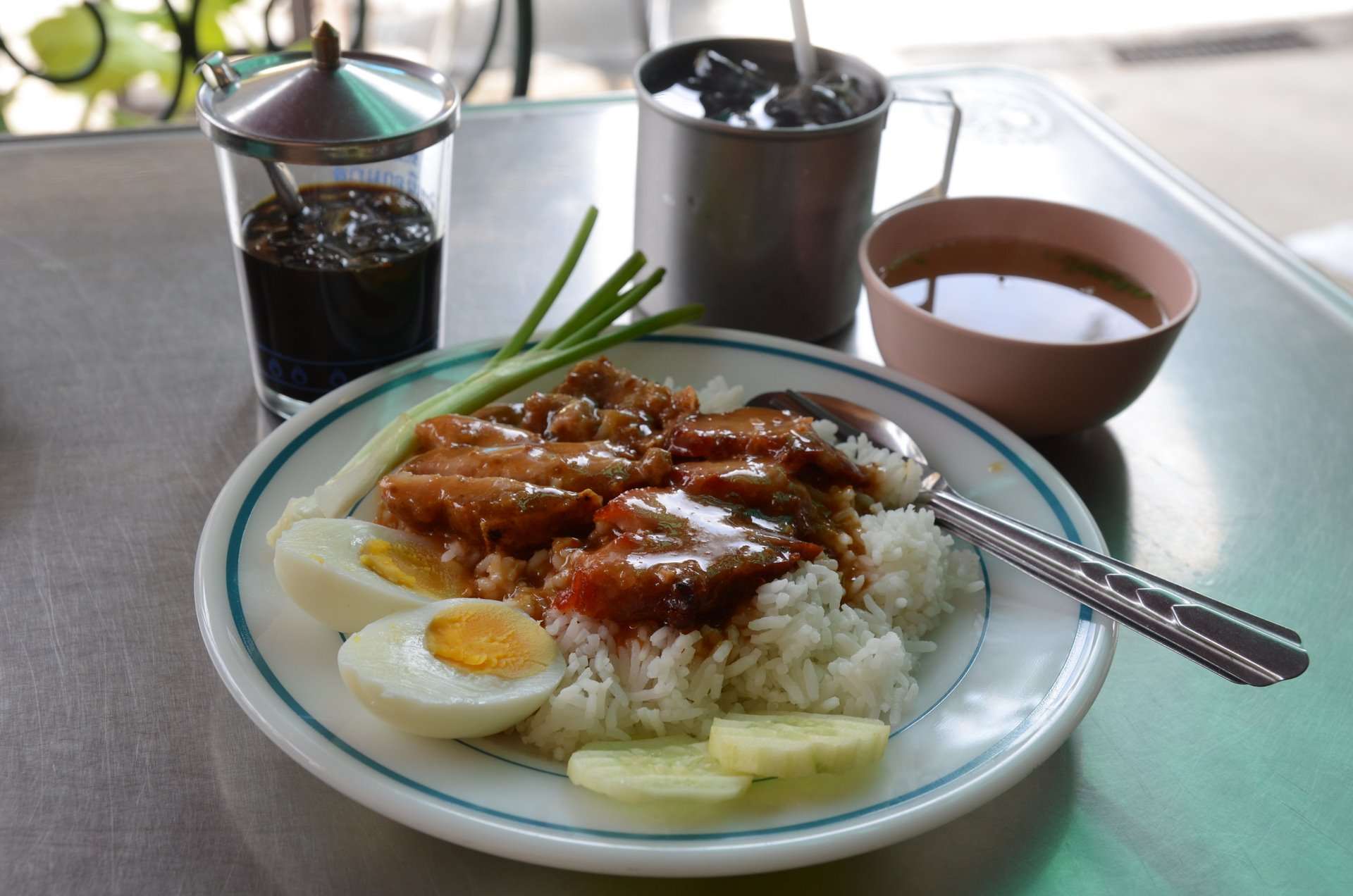
- Khao mu daeng mu krop
- Type: Rice dish
- Course: Main course
- Place of origin: Thailand
- Region or state: Southeast Asia
- Serving temperature: Hot
- Main ingredients: Barbequed red pork, steamed rice, Chinese sausage, half boiled eggs (or half spiced corned eggs), crispy fried streaky pork, sweet bean gravy, dipping black soy sauce
- Variations: Khao mu krop, khao mu daeng mu krop

Khao mu daeng (Thai: ข้าวหมูแดง, pronounced [kʰâːw mǔː dɛ̄ːŋ], lit.: 'red-pork rice') is a Thai dish, the local variant of char siew with rice (Chinese: 叉烧饭, pinyin: chā shāo fàn) of Chinese cuisine.

Khao mu daeng is an individual rice (khao) dish made of steamed rice, topped with red pork (mu daeng), kun chiang, half boiled duck eggs (or half spiced corned eggs), and crispy fried streaky pork; served with sliced cucumbers and green shallots; and covered with sweet bean gravy. The dipping sauces are black soy sauce and chili vinegar, while nam phrik phao (Thai roasted chili paste) is optional.

Khao mu krop (Thai: ข้าวหมูกรอบ, pronounced [kʰâːw mǔː krɔ̀ːp], lit.: 'crispy-pork rice'; Chinese: 香炸五花肉盖饭, xiāngzhá wúhuā ròu gài fàn) is a variation of khao mu daeng. It is khao mu daeng without red pork.

Both khao mu daeng and khao mu krop are dishes that can be found easily, either on street sides, food courts, marketplaces or at various restaurants like other individual rice dishes such as khao man kai, khao kha mu and khao na pet.

In Bangkok, there are many well-known khao mu daeng restaurants in various neighbourhoods such as Si Lom, Talat Phlu, Wat Trai Mit, Sao Chiangcha, Thanon Plaeng Nam, and Sam Phraeng.
