= Discada =

Grilled meat dish from North Mexican cuisine

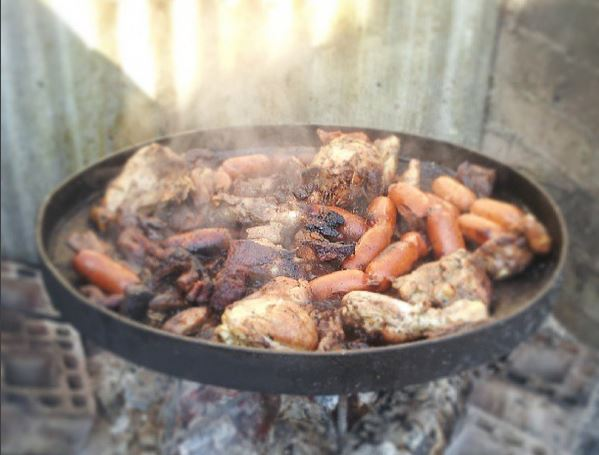
A platter of discada

A discada (also known as a cowboy wok or a plow disc cooker, Spanish: disco) is a large disc cookware found in Mexican and Southwestern US cooking. It is also the name for a mixed meat dish made with this cooking utensil.

== The disc ==
The disc is usually a disc harrow made of either iron or steel. It is round, wide, angled toward a deeper center, but not as deep as a Chinese wok. This provides a larger surface area for heat to be concentrated in the center, allowing for things like tortillas and toast to be prepared along the edges. Modern additions like a tripod or handles are now commonplace, but such handles are for transporting since unlike a wok it is not often used to toss the food.

Discadas are deeply associated with vaquero and cowboy culture, which has led to its affectionate "cowboy wok" moniker.

== The dish ==
Discada or disco technically denotes the disc itself, though it has become synonymous with the popular meal commonly made on it. The basic meats for a traditional discada include beef (usually a flank cut), bacon, ham, sausage, and Mexican chorizo. The disk is placed over an open flame, and the ingredients are introduced one at a time. The meats are seasoned and marinated according to the cook's preference and usually include salt, pepper, lime juice, and garlic. Aromatics including white or purple onions, bell peppers, Jalapeno or Serrano peppers, olives, and tomatoes are also used to add flavor and color to the dish.

Once an ideal cooking heat is reached on the disk (usually medium to low heat works best) the first meat to be introduced is the bacon. This is placed at the center of the concave disk where the heat is concentrated. The natural fat from the bacon will prevent the meats from sticking. Beer or root beer is added to create a broth for simmering the meats which also acts as a non stick agent. The bacon is placed away from direct heat onto the side of the disk once its cooked, and the sausage links are introduced to the remaining broth. As each piece of meat is removed from the direct heat, the meat's natural juices and the beer or root beer create a broth for the next meat piece to be introduced to. Once cooked, the sausage is also set aside and the ham is added. The ham is set aside, and the chorizo is added next. The beef as well as the cook's choice of seasoning is finally added to the collective broth. Each meat is cooked for about 10 to 15 minutes. The beef is covered with a lid during the cooking process to contain its natural flavor and juices. The lid is then removed to allow the broth to reduce, and the meats can now be combined with the beef and the collective broth from the different meats. The onions, peppers, and tomatoes are chopped and added to the mix providing the dish with color and the meats with flavor.

The dish can be served with traditional Mexican side dishes like rice and beans. It is also served with guacamole, and salsa. Regional variations exist throughout northern Mexico and the United States.

== Other dishes ==
It is typically used for cooking the mixed meat dish, but can be used to make a variety of meals. This includes tacos, cowboy shakshuka, stir frying, and others. Another common dish is called breakfast discada, which is huevos rancheros cooked using the discada.

== See also ==
- List of meat dishes
