= Doblada (Mexican cuisine) =

Mexican corn or wheat tortilla

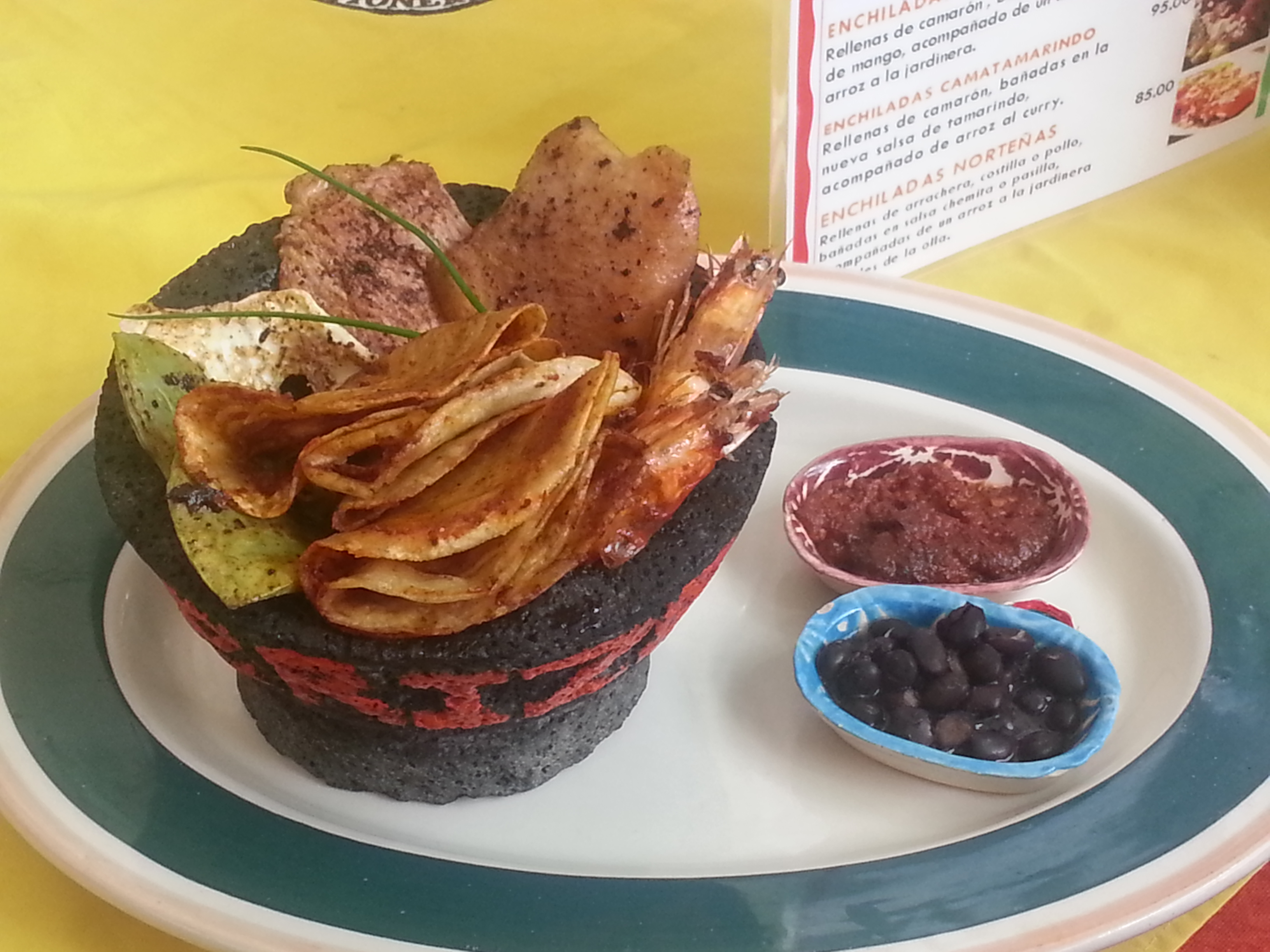
Dobladas in a molcajete

Doblada in Mexican food, is a corn tortilla or wheat tortilla, folded one time, forming a half circle, or folded twice forming a quarter circle, which is sauteed in oil, covered with sauce and sprinkled with cheese. As a garnish, it can accompany some dishes as in carne a la tampiqueña or be an appetizer, as in enchiladas or enfrijoladas with no chicken filling. It originated in Chihuahua.
