= Berner Platte =

Bernese traditional meat dish

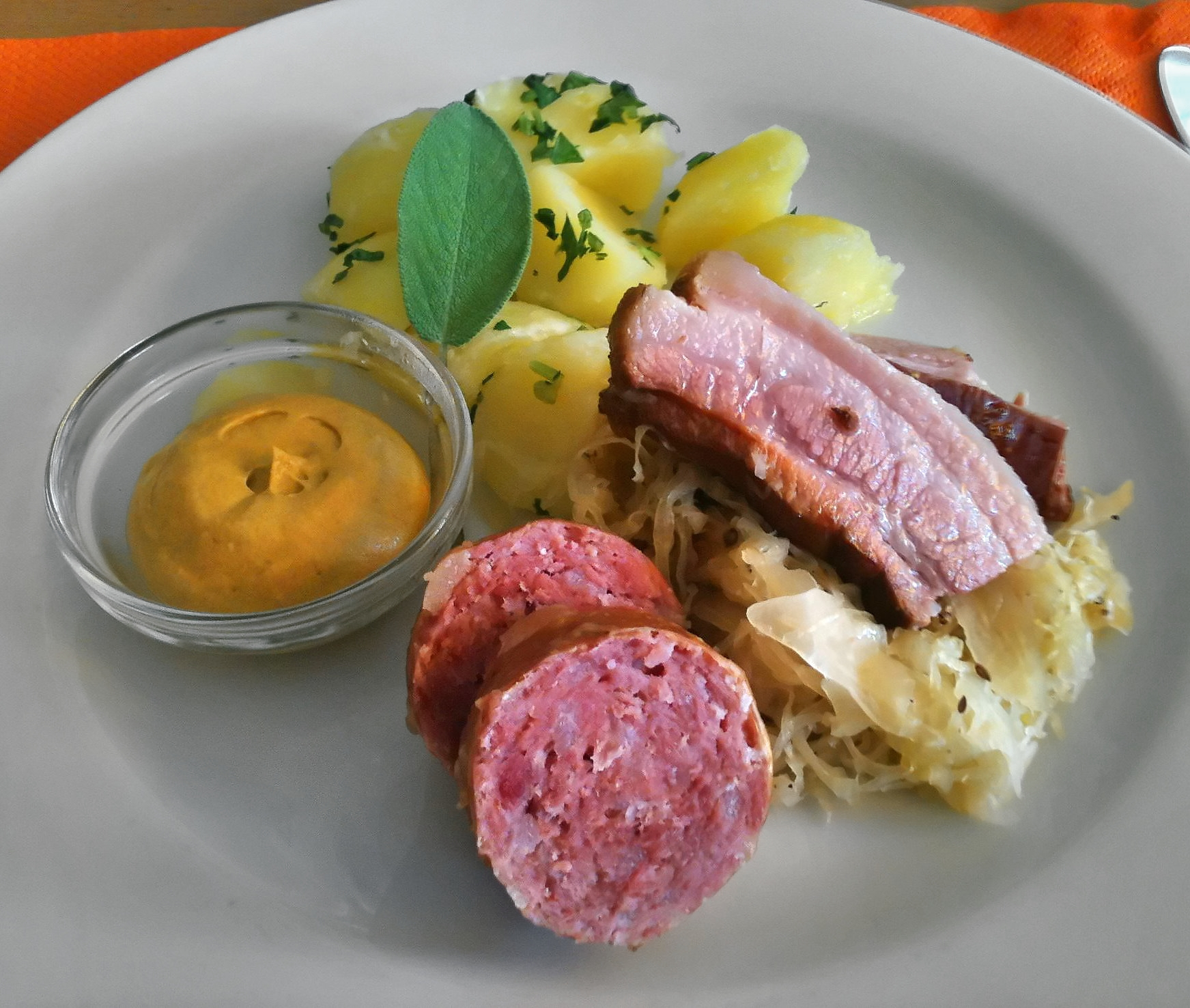
A dish containing most elements of the traditional Berner Platte: sauerkraut, potatoes, sausage, lardon and mustard

The Berner Platte (English: Bernese plate) is a traditional meat dish of Bernese cuisine in Switzerland. It consists of various meat and sausage varieties such as smoked pork and beef, pork belly, sausage, bacon and pork ears or tails cooked with juniper-flavored sauerkraut, and other foods, such as potatoes and green and/or dried beans, which are served on a large plate.

The Berner Platte is not a stew; rather, the different meat ingredients and side dishes are each separately prepared or cooked. Berner Platte dishes are sometimes served within the context of a buffet.

== History ==
The Berner Platte originated on March 5, 1798, when the Bernese defeated the French army at the Battle at Neuenegg and returned as the victor. A victory celebration had to be organized in a very short time. For this purpose, the community contributed the best of their supplies. Due to the late winters, mainly durable or preserved foods were used, which were combined to create the well-known dish.

== See also ==
- Choucroute garnie – a similar French dish
- Schlachteplatte – a similar German dish
- List of meat dishes
- Swiss cuisine
