= Pachola =

Ground beef dish from Mexican cuisine

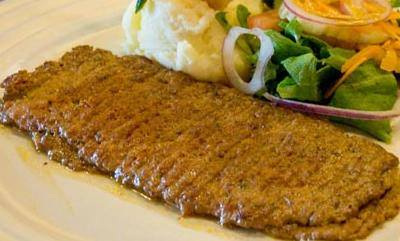
Pachola

Pachola is a type of prepared meat in Mexican cuisine. It originates from the state of Jalisco. It consists of a flattened and spiced ground beef patty made using a metate (grinding stone). The beef is mixed with ground ancho chili, cumin, garlic and bread, and fried in oil. Pacholas are sometimes grilled.
