= Choucroute garnie =

Alsatian recipe

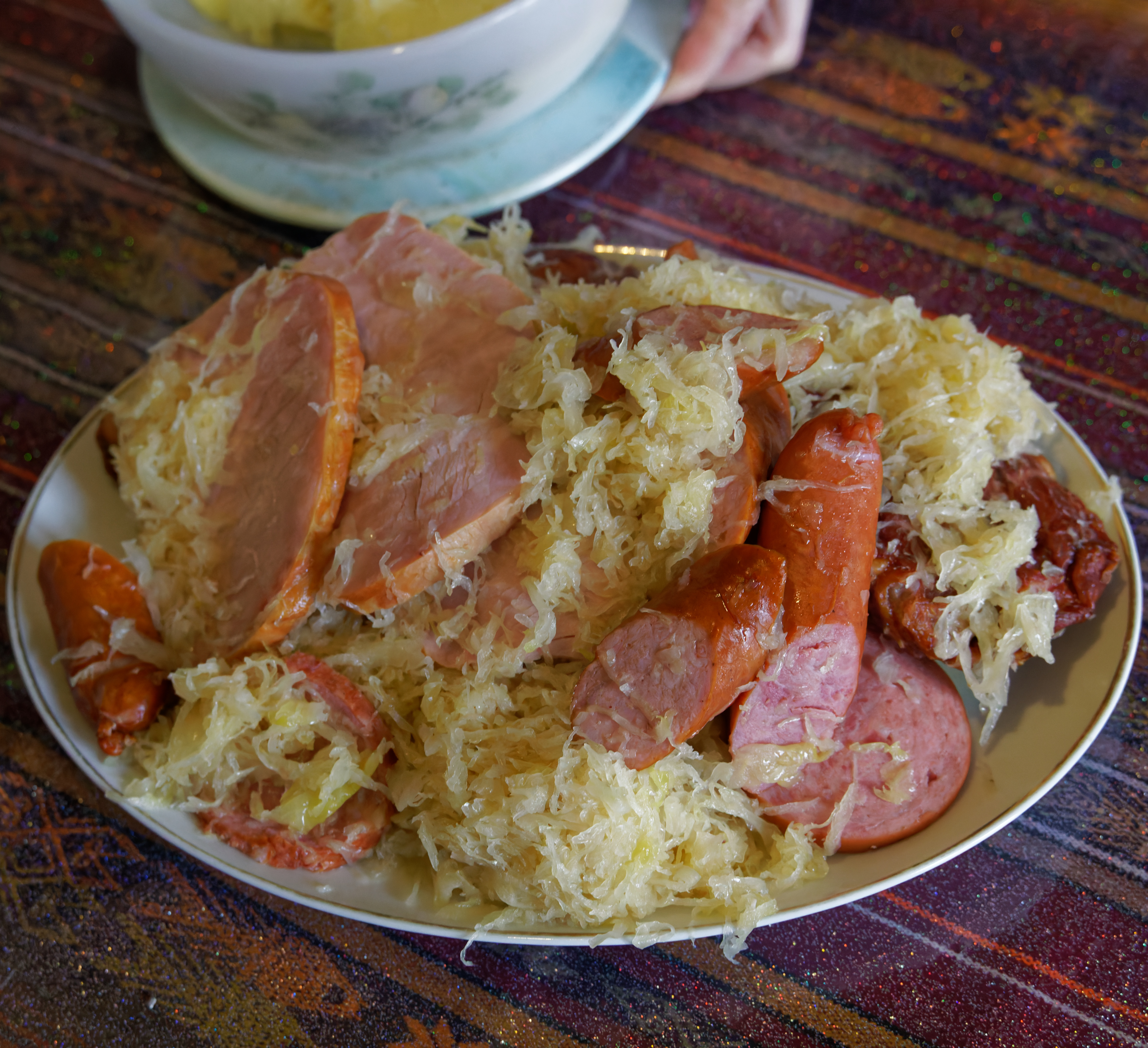
A garnie served with pork meat, sauerkraut and sausage

Choucroute garnie (French for dressed sauerkraut) is an Alsatian recipe of sauerkraut with sausages and other salted meats and charcuterie, and often potatoes.

Although sauerkraut is a traditionally German and Eastern European dish, when Alsace became part of France following the Westphalia peace treaties in 1648, it brought this dish to the attention of French chefs and it has since been widely adopted in France.

== Background ==
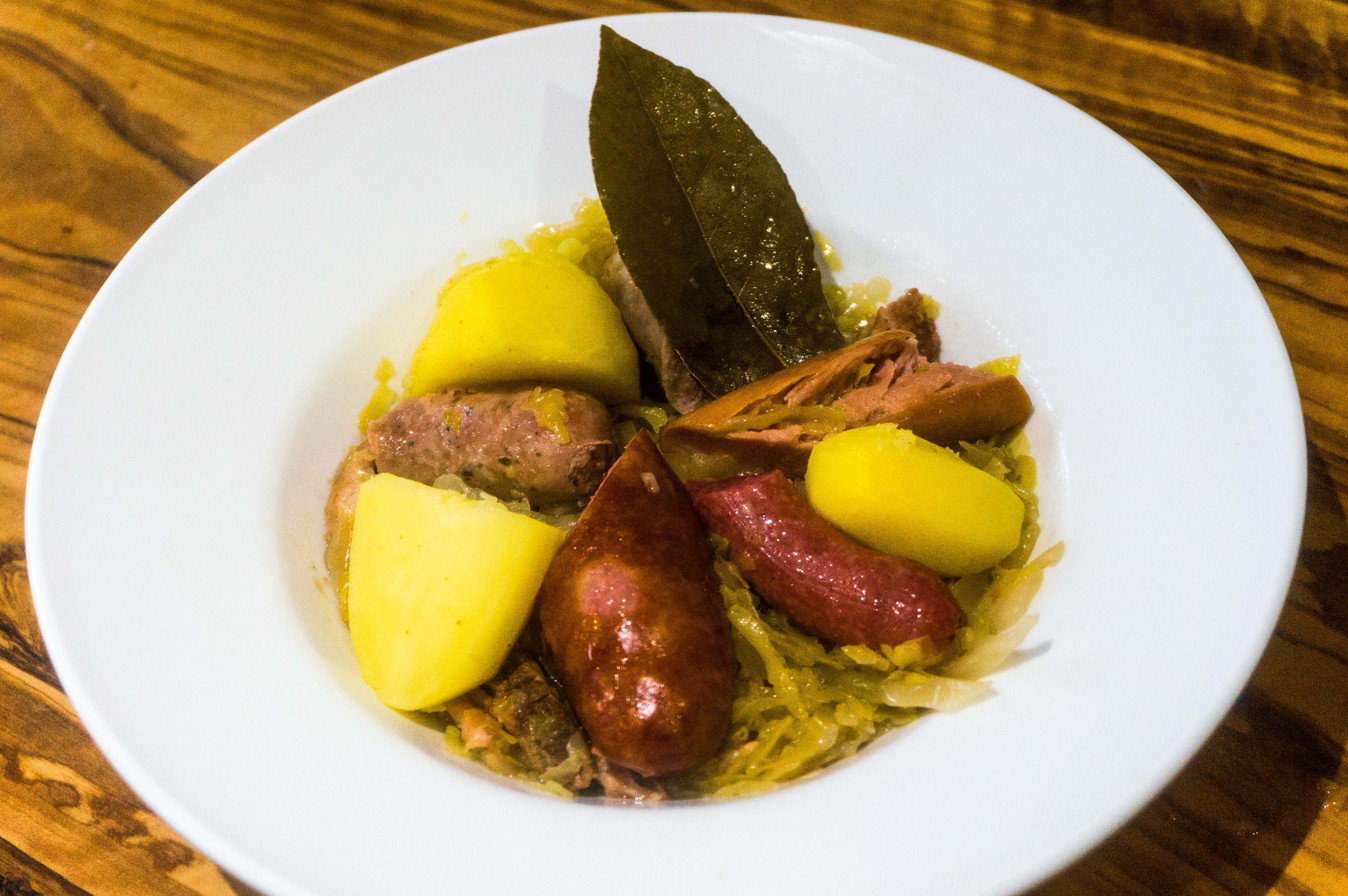
Choucroute garnie, with Montbéliard, Strasbourg, Toulouse, Vienna sausages and potatoes

There is no fixed recipe for this dish – any preparation of hot sauerkraut with meat and potatoes could qualify – but in practice there are certain traditions, favourite recipes, and stereotypical garnishes that are more commonly called choucroute garnie than others. Traditional recipes call for three types of sausage: Morteau sausage or Montbéliard sausage, Strasbourg sausage and Frankfurt sausage. Fatty, inexpensive or salted cuts of pork also often form a part of choucroute garnie, including ham hocks, pork knuckles and shoulders, back bacon and slices of salt pork. Other recipes call for pieces of fish or goose meat, but this is far less typical.

The cabbage itself is usually heated with a glass of Riesling or other dry white wines or stock, and goose or pork fat. In some recipes, it may also be cooked with chopped onion and sliced apples. Food writer Jeffrey Steingarten attempted to catalogue the composition of an authentic recipe in 1989. He writes that every traditional recipe includes black peppercorns, cloves, garlic, juniper berries, onions, and potatoes; most include bay leaves and wine.

Like cassoulet, pot-au-feu, and other dishes in French regional cuisine, its origin is as a simple, inexpensive dish, but grand versions (such as choucroute royale, made with Champagne instead of Riesling), and grand ingredients (such as foie gras and wild game) are mentioned both in traditional sources (e.g. Ali-Bab) and in recipes from contemporary chefs and restaurants.

Choucroute garnie is available throughout France in canned or microwavable ready-to-eat form.

Shredded cabbage can also be added along with the sauerkraut to produce a somewhat less acidic version.

== See also ==
- Berner Platte – a similar Swiss dish
- Schlachteplatte – a similar German dish
