= Carne a la tampiqueña =

Mexican cuisine

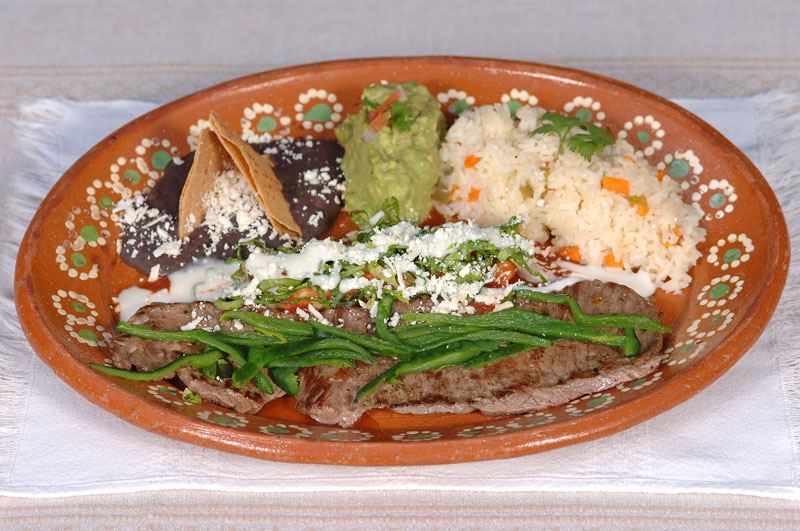
Carne a la tampiqueña

Carne a la tampiqueña is one of the most popular meat dishes in Mexico. It was created in 1939 by the restaurateur José Inés Loredo and his brother chef Fidel, originally from San Luis Potosí, at their restaurant "Tampico Club" on Avenida Mexico in México City. . The restaurant was named in honor of the years the brothers had lived in the port of Tampico, Tamaulipas.

Each ingredient was given a meaning. The oval platter represents the Huasteca; the strip of roasted meat, the Rio Panuco; the green enchiladas, the huasteco field; the white cheese, the purity of the people living in the Huasteca; the guacamole, the fruits of the region; the black beans, both the fertility of the land and the oil boom in the area.

== See also ==
- List of meat dishes
