= Teste de Turke =

Teste de Turke (translated as "Turks head") is a dish of medieval cuisine, which had its origin according to today's knowledge in the Arab area. Through the cultural exchange after the Norman conquest of Sicily, which was formerly under Arab influence, this dish also reached England and France, where similar to Poume d'oranges, it appeared in various medieval Anglo-Norman manuscripts.

Several forms of preparation existed for the dish. Outside of the fasting period, it was made from pork and chicken. The meat was finely chopped or ground and mixed with saffron, eggs, bread crumbs, almonds and spices. It was then boiled in a saumagen (pig's stomach), after which the saumagen was removed, the meat mass was coated with an egg yolk and the dish was then baked until the egg and bread crumbs solidified. In its form, this dish may have been prepared to resemble a human head.

In another variant handed down by a preserved Anglo-Norman manuscript, a dough was filled with rabbit and poultry meat mixed with dates, cheese and honey. The head-like appearance was achieved, among other things, by sprinkling the pastry mold with dark nuts and the sides with pistachios, to create the semblance of human hair. (Note: "The head (of hair) should be black, arranged to resemble the hair of a woman, in a black bowl, with the face of a man set on top.") Both variants can be traced back to a Moorish-Spanish dish called Rās maimūn.
