= Poume d'oranges =

Medieval pork dish

Poume d'oranges, also referred to as pome dorreng and pommedorry, is a characteristic gilded (coated) pork meatball dish from Medieval cuisine that was a part of elite food culture during the Middle Ages. The dish was prepared to resemble the color of oranges, which was performed by using an egg yolk glaze. Poume d'oranges dish was often used for courtly English feasts and is listed in Medieval cooking manuscripts. The dish was denoted as pome dorreng on the coronation menu for Henry IV of England.

Poume d'oranges is mentioned in Anglo-Norman manuscripts and other documents, which points to the influence of Arab cuisine on European cuisine. This influence is most likely due to the fact that Normans conquered Sicily in the 11th century, which was dominated by Arabs for several centuries. In southern Spain, the Moors ruled for centuries. A similar dish of Medieval origin is Teste de Turke.

== See also ==
- List of meatball dishes
- List of pork dishes
