= Hachee =

Dutch stew

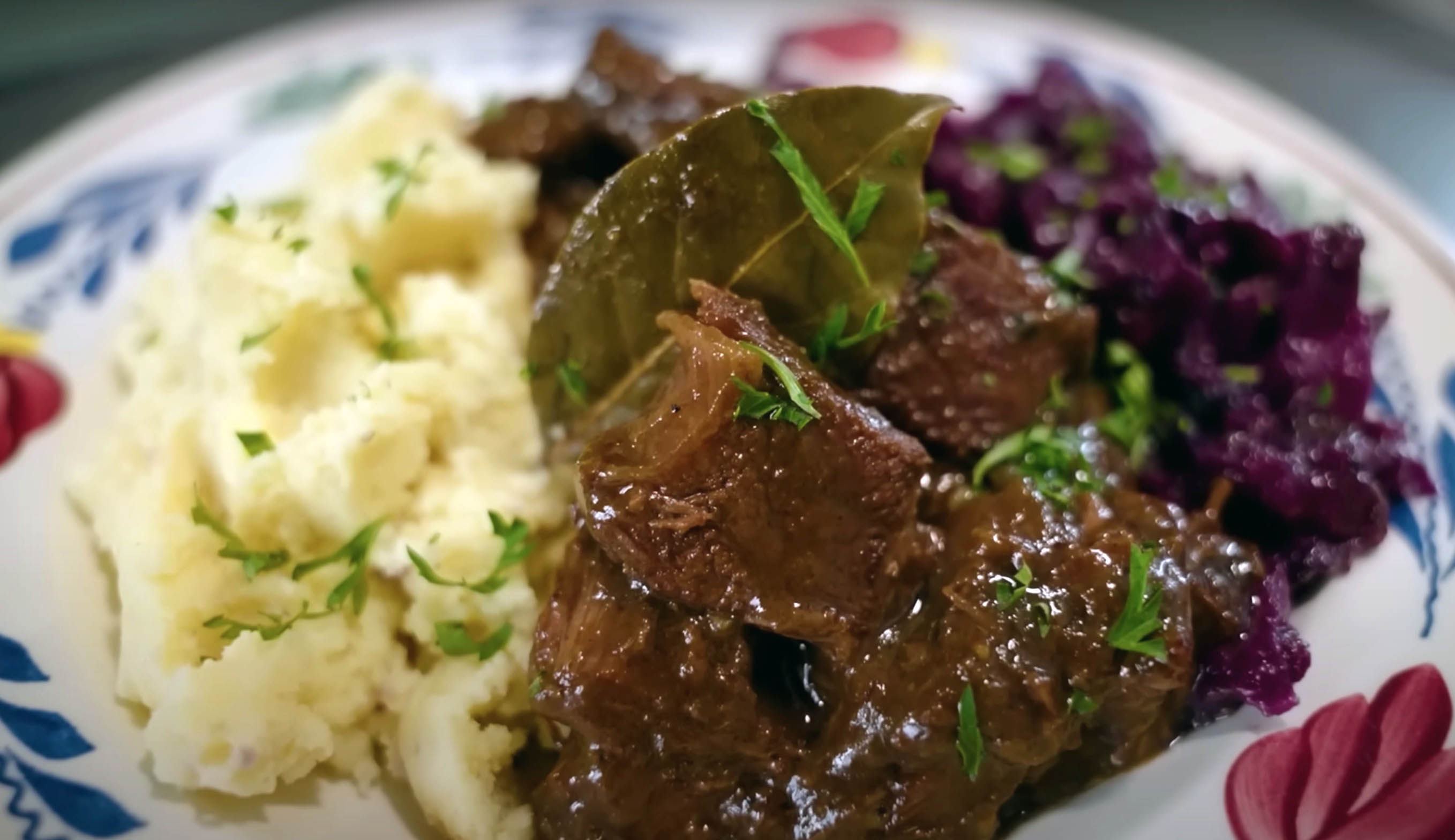
- Dutch hachee with red cabbage
- Type: Stew
- Place of origin: Netherlands
- Main ingredients: Meat, fish or poultry; vegetables

Hachee (Dutch pronunciation: [ɦɑˈɕeː]) is a traditional Dutch stew based on beef, onions, apple butter, breakfast bread, and vinegar, is a typical example of traditional Dutch cuisine. Clove and bay leaves are added to the thick gravy. It is usually served with mashed potatoes and red cabbage.

== Origin ==
The word hachée in French means chopped or ground, being the past participle of the verb hacher -- to chop or grind. Hachees have been described in Medieval buffets, although the exact recipe usually is not described. The stew probably has its origin in the reuse of meat cooked in a Dutch oven together with vegetables that happened to be available. Wine or vinegar were added to make the meat more tender.

== See also ==
- List of stews
- Flemish stew
- Sauerbraten
