= Sautéed reindeer =

Traditional Scandavanian and Russian meal

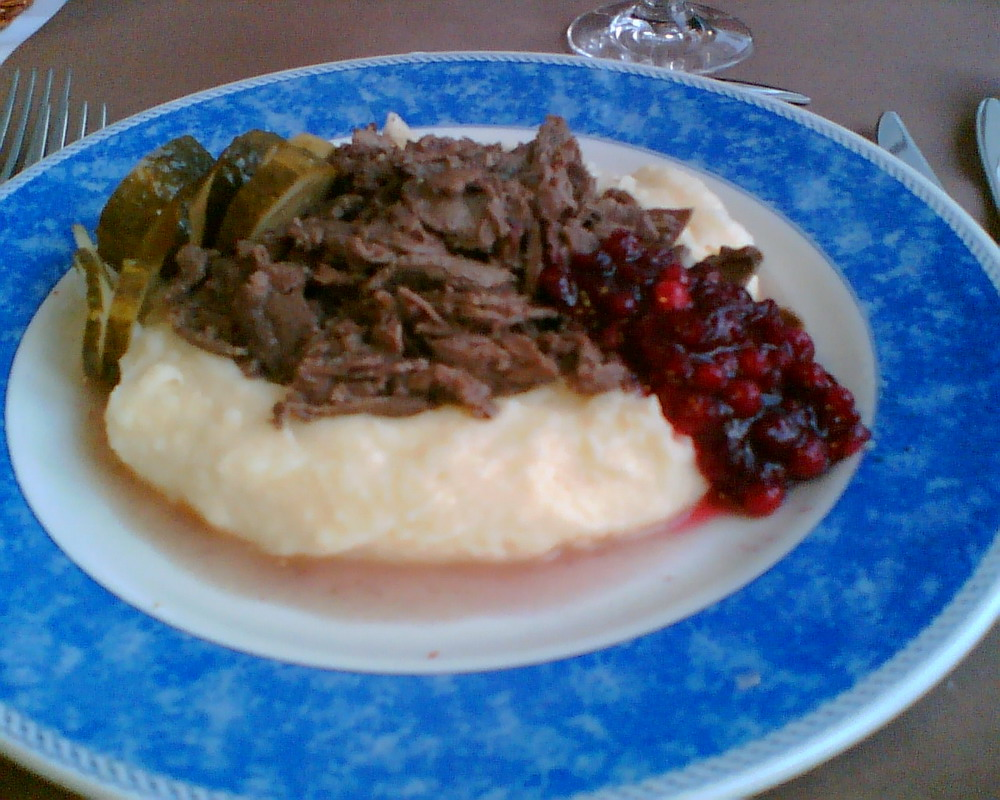
Finnish version of sauteed reindeer

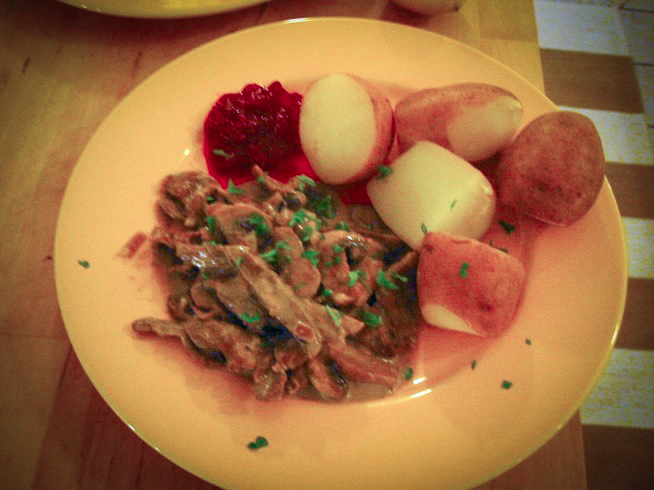
Swedish version of sauteed reindeer

Sautéed reindeer (Finnish: poronkäristys [ˈporoŋˌkæristys], Swedish: renskav, Norwegian: finnbiff, Northern Sami: báistebiđus; Russian: тушёная оленина; Yakut: олень эт тушёнка) is perhaps the best known traditional meal from Sápmi in Finland, Sweden, Norway and Russia and Sakha. Usually steak or the back of the reindeer is used. It is sliced thinly (usually while the meat is still frozen so that it is easier to cut through), fried in fat (traditionally in reindeer fat, but butter and oil are more common nowadays), and spiced with black pepper and salt. Finally, some water, cream, or beer is added, and it is cooked until tender. The dish is served with mashed potatoes and lingonberry preserves or, more traditionally, with raw lingonberries mashed with sugar. In Finland, the meat is often served with pickled cucumber, which is not as common in Sweden.
