= Surkål =

Sour cabbage dish

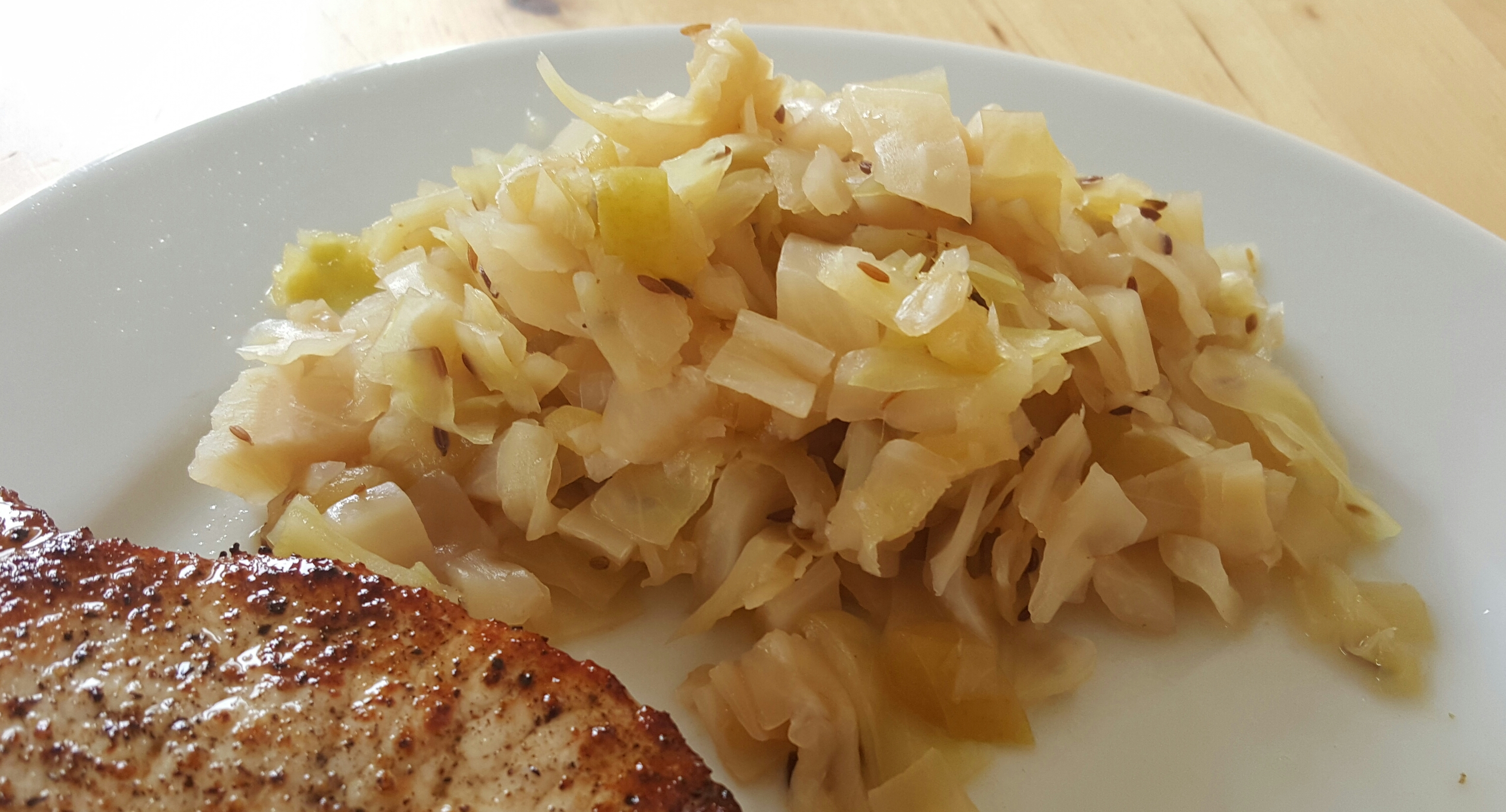
Surkål and pork chop.

Surkål ('sour cabbage') is a Scandinavian word, a direct translation of German Sauerkraut. It is used for that dish (fermented cabbage) in Danish and Swedish, but in Norwegian it refers to sliced and boiled cabbage, pickled with vinegar and sugar, spiced with cumin.

For the Norwegian dish, the cabbage is finely sliced and slowly cooked with caraway and cumin seeds, apple, vinegar, sugar, salt and butter. Surkål is usually served together with pork. Surkål is not to be mistaken for sauerkraut as it does not go through a fermentation process.

== See also ==
- List of cabbage dishes
- Bayrisch Kraut
