= List of cabbage dishes =

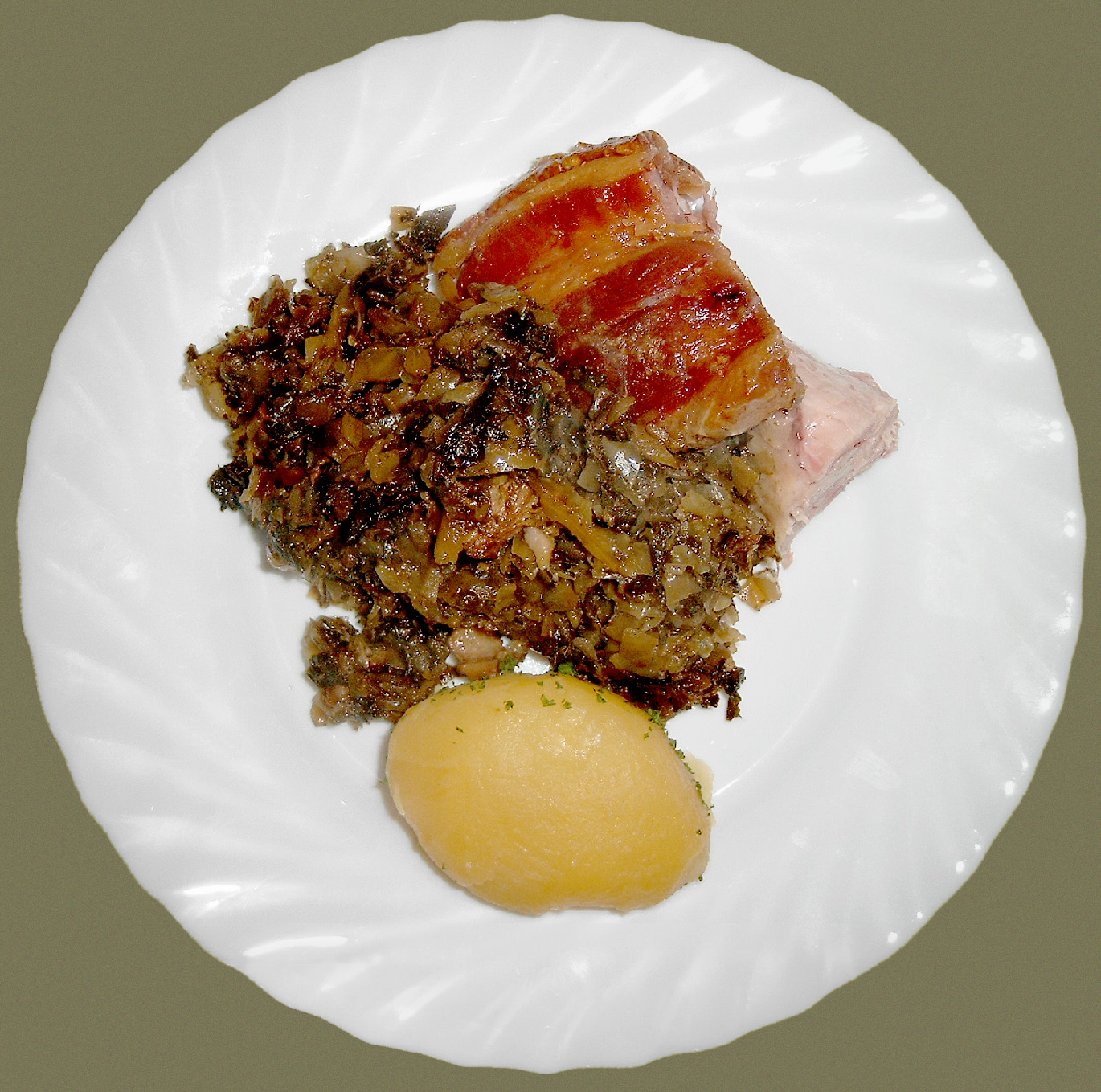
Knieperkohl (middle) served with kassler (cured pork) and pellkartoffel (potato cooked in its skin)

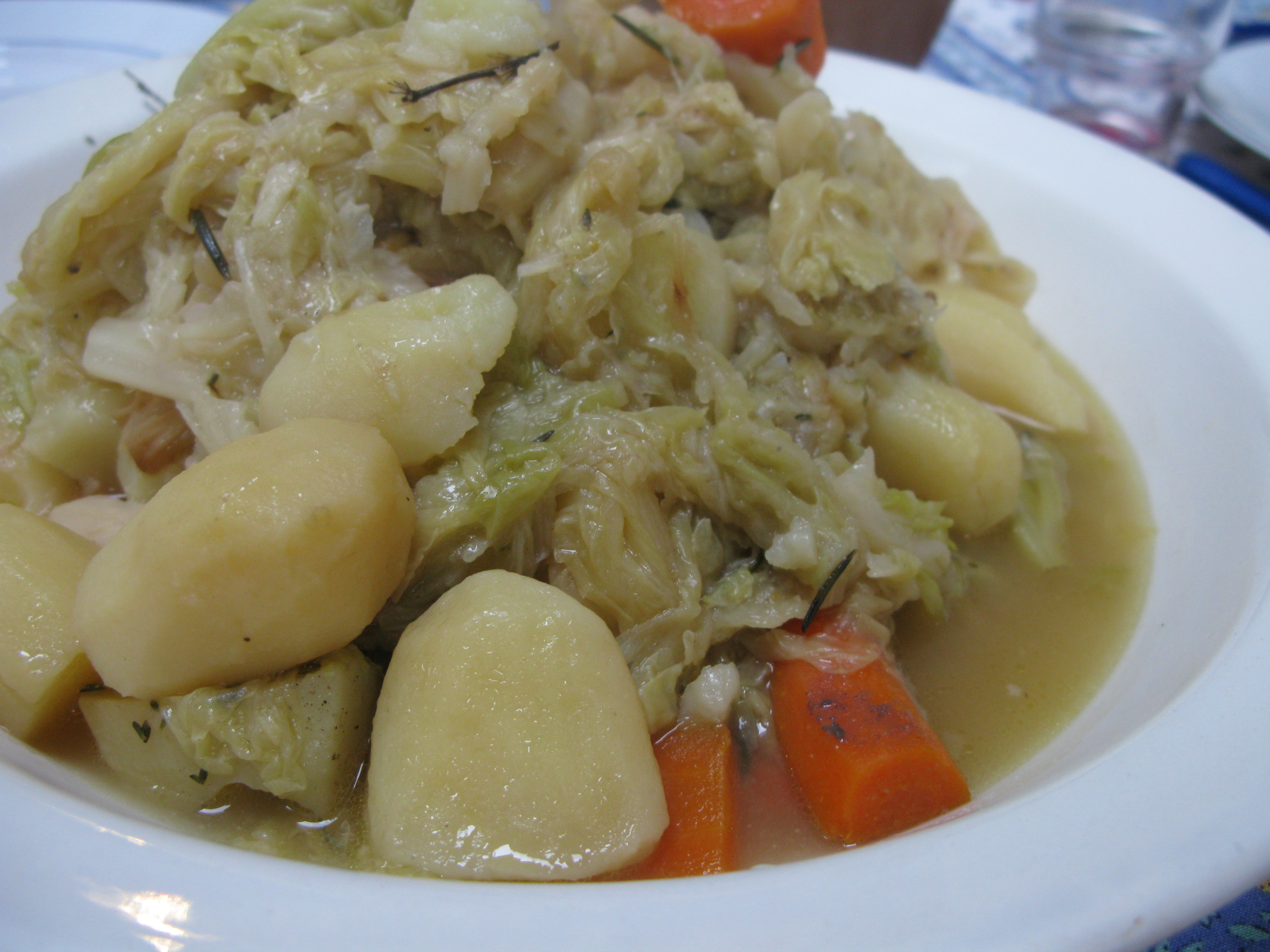
Potée variation of cabbage stew

This is a list of cabbage dishes and foods. Cabbage (Brassica oleracea or variants) is a leafy green or purple biennial plant, grown as an annual vegetable crop for its dense-leaved heads. Cabbage heads generally range from 0.5 to 4 kilograms (1 to 9 lb), and can be green, purple and white. Smooth-leafed firm-headed green cabbages are the most common, with smooth-leafed red and crinkle-leafed savoy cabbages of both colors seen more rarely. Cabbages are prepared in many different ways for eating. They can be pickled, fermented for dishes such as sauerkraut, steamed, stewed, sautéed, braised, or eaten raw. Cabbage is a good source of vitamin K, vitamin C and dietary fiber. Contaminated cabbage has been linked to cases of food-borne illness in humans.

== Cabbage dishes ==
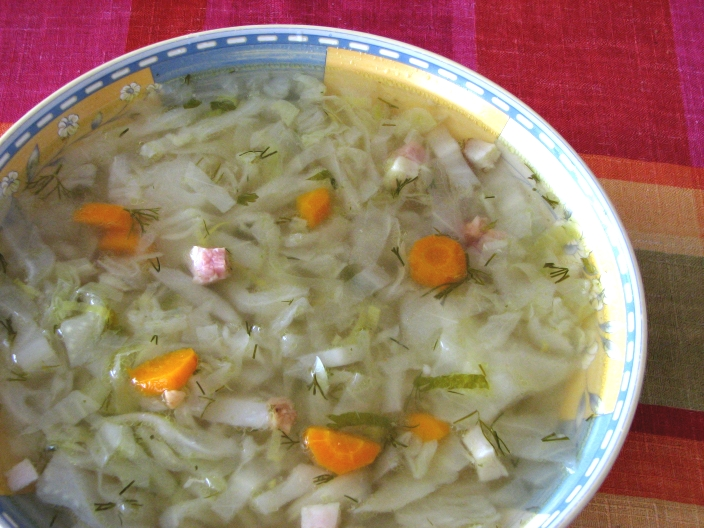
Cabbage soup

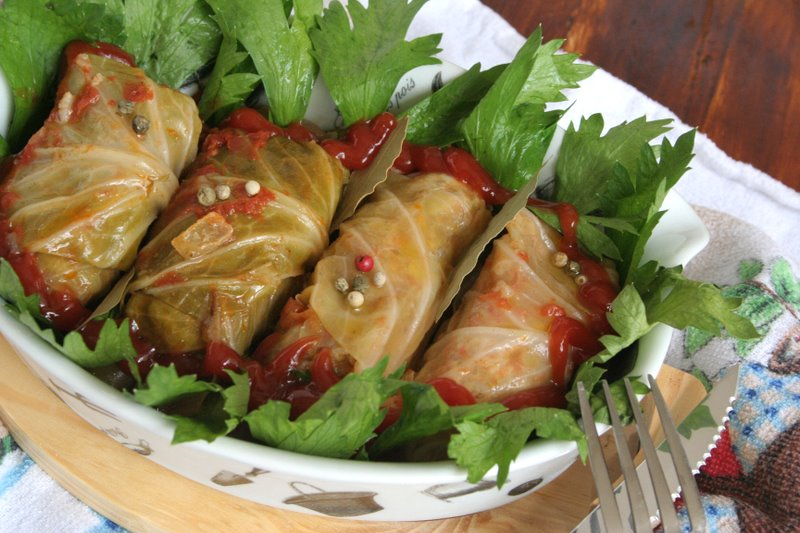
Cabbage rolls, holishkes variant

- Bacon and cabbage – traditionally associated with Ireland, the dish consists of unsliced back bacon (although smoked bacon is sometimes used), and it is boiled with cabbage. (Sometimes other vegetables are added such as turnips, onions, and carrots.) It is usually served with boiled potatoes.
- Bayrisch Kraut
- Bigos – Polish stew
- Braised sauerkraut
- Bubble and squeak – traditional English dish made with the shallow-fried leftover vegetables from a roast dinner. Cabbage is sometimes used.
- Cabbage pie
  - Coulibiac
  - Lakror
  - Sha phaley
- Cabbage roll
  - Golabki
  - Holishkes, sometimes referred to as golub
  - Kåldolmar
  - Sarma
  - Capuns
- Cabbage squares
- Cabbage soup
  - Shchi
  - Caldo galego
  - Caldo verde
- Cabbage stew
  - Cassoeula
  - Kapuska and Surkål – Turkish cuisine cabbage stews
- Chimichurri burger
- Colcannon
- Coleslaw
- Curtido
- Fårikål
- Jiggs dinner – Canadian boiled dinner, popular in Newfoundland
- Kaalilaatikko
- Kimchi
- Knieperkohl
- Lion's head – dish from the Huaiyang cuisine of eastern China, consisting of large pork meatballs stewed with vegetables. The plain variety is usually stewed or steamed with napa cabbage.
- Lenivye golubtsy - a mix of minced meat and cabbage, popular in Russia
- Malfouf salad
- Motsunabe
- Pikliz
- Podvarak
- Red slaw
- Rotkohl – Northern German dish made from cooked red cabbage, vinegar, cloves, and tart apples.
- Rumbledethumps
- Surkål
- Trinxat
- Wedding cabbage
- Whole sour cabbage
- Zasmażana kapusta – Polish cuisine sauerkraut dish; see braised sauerkraut
Cabbage dishes

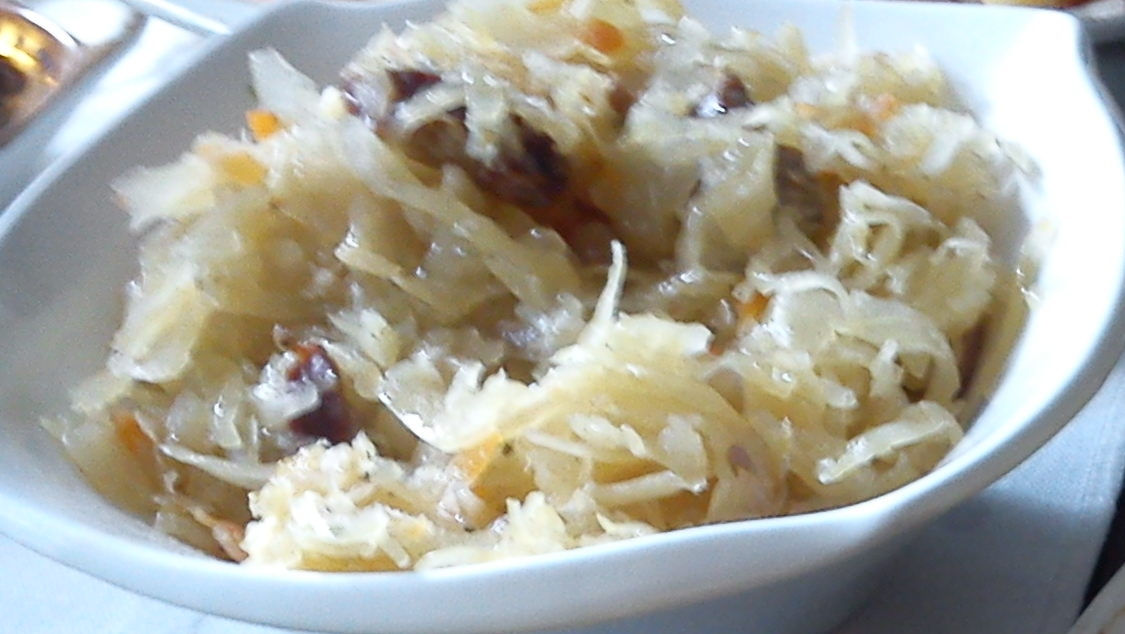
Bacon and cabbage

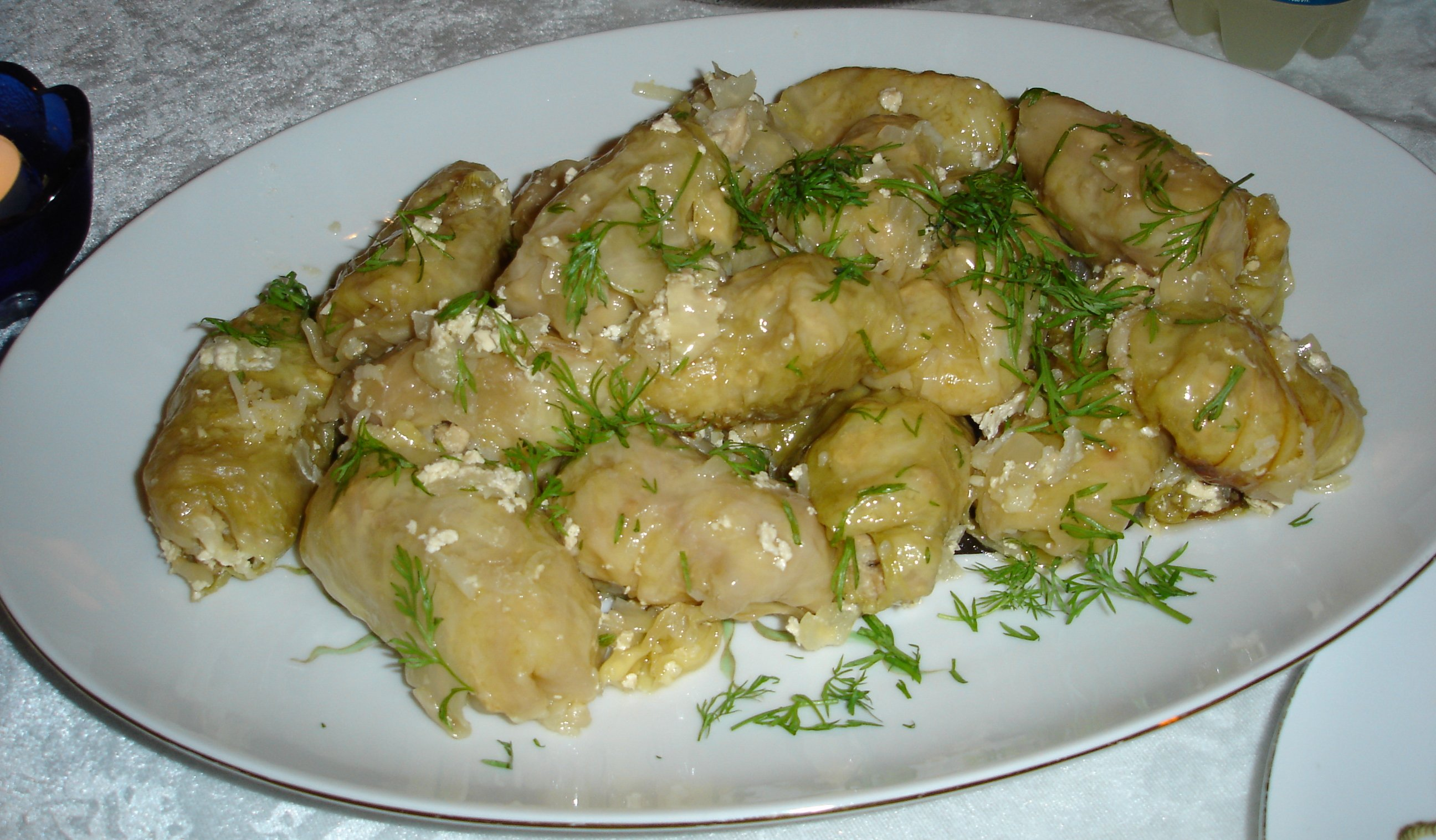
Central European cabbage rolls

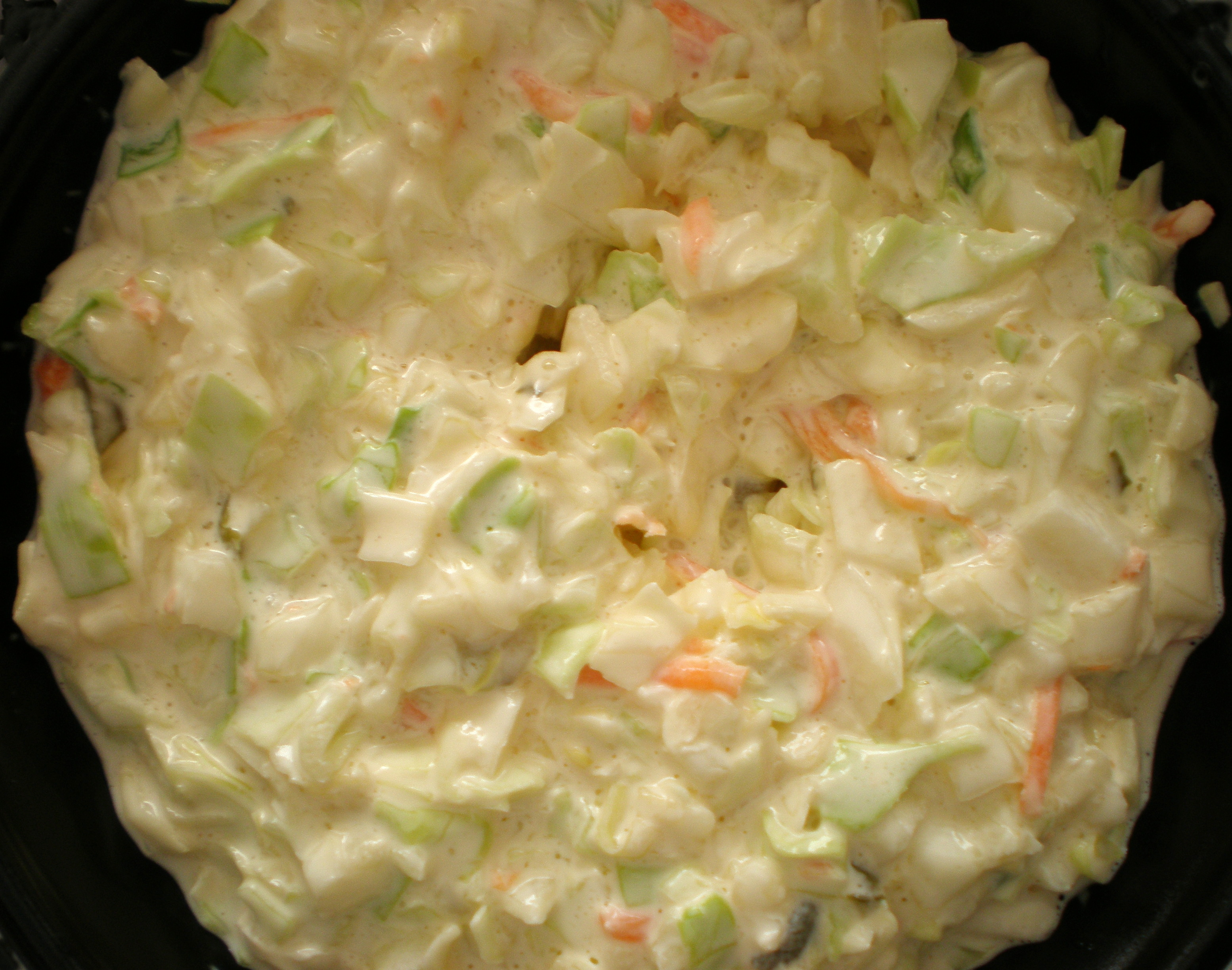
American coleslaw from a fast food restaurant

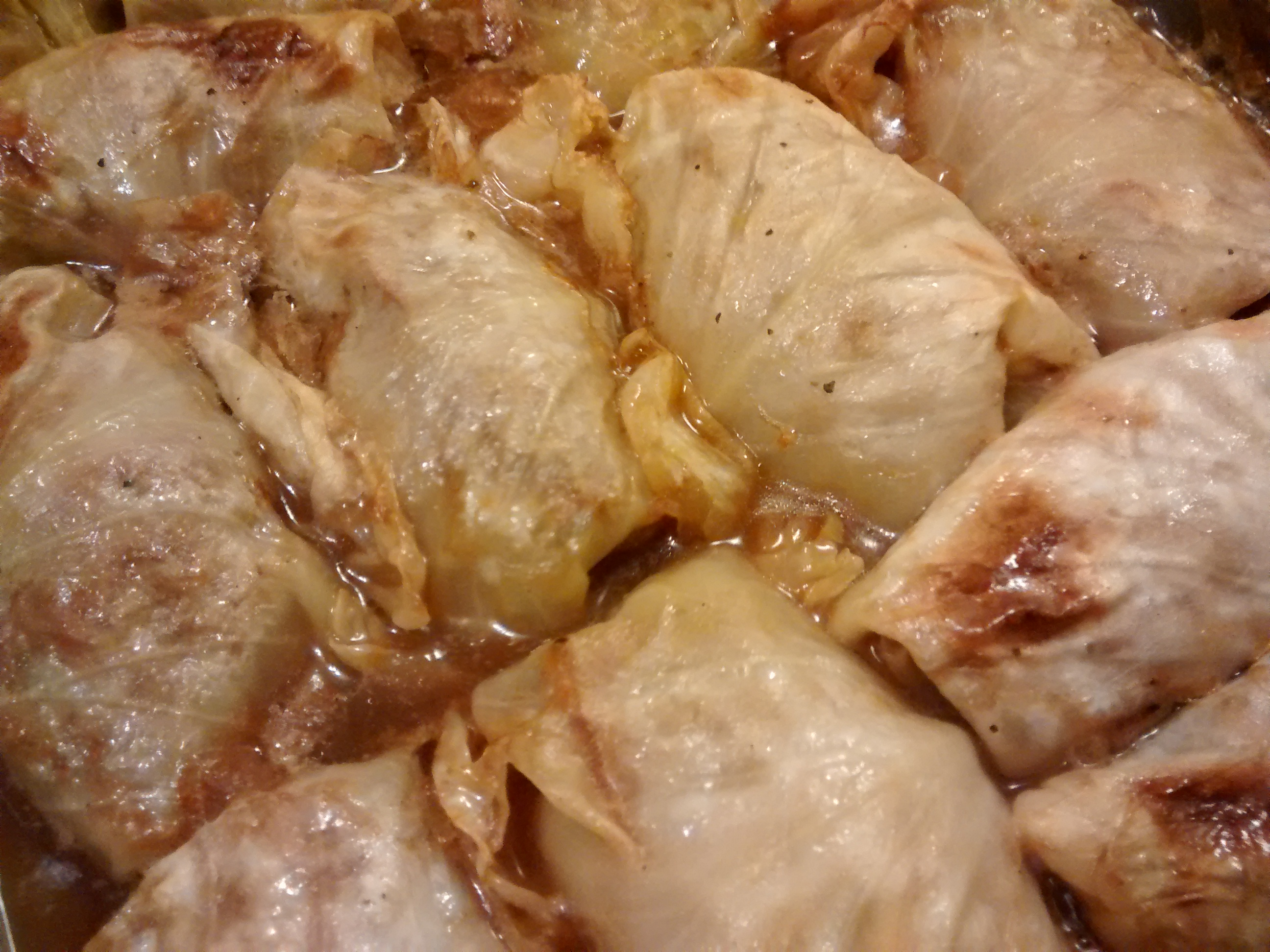
Kåldolmar is a Swedish cabbage roll.

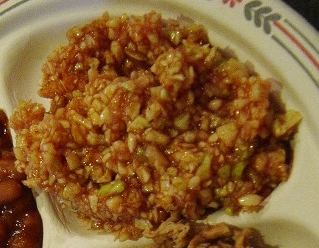
Red slaw

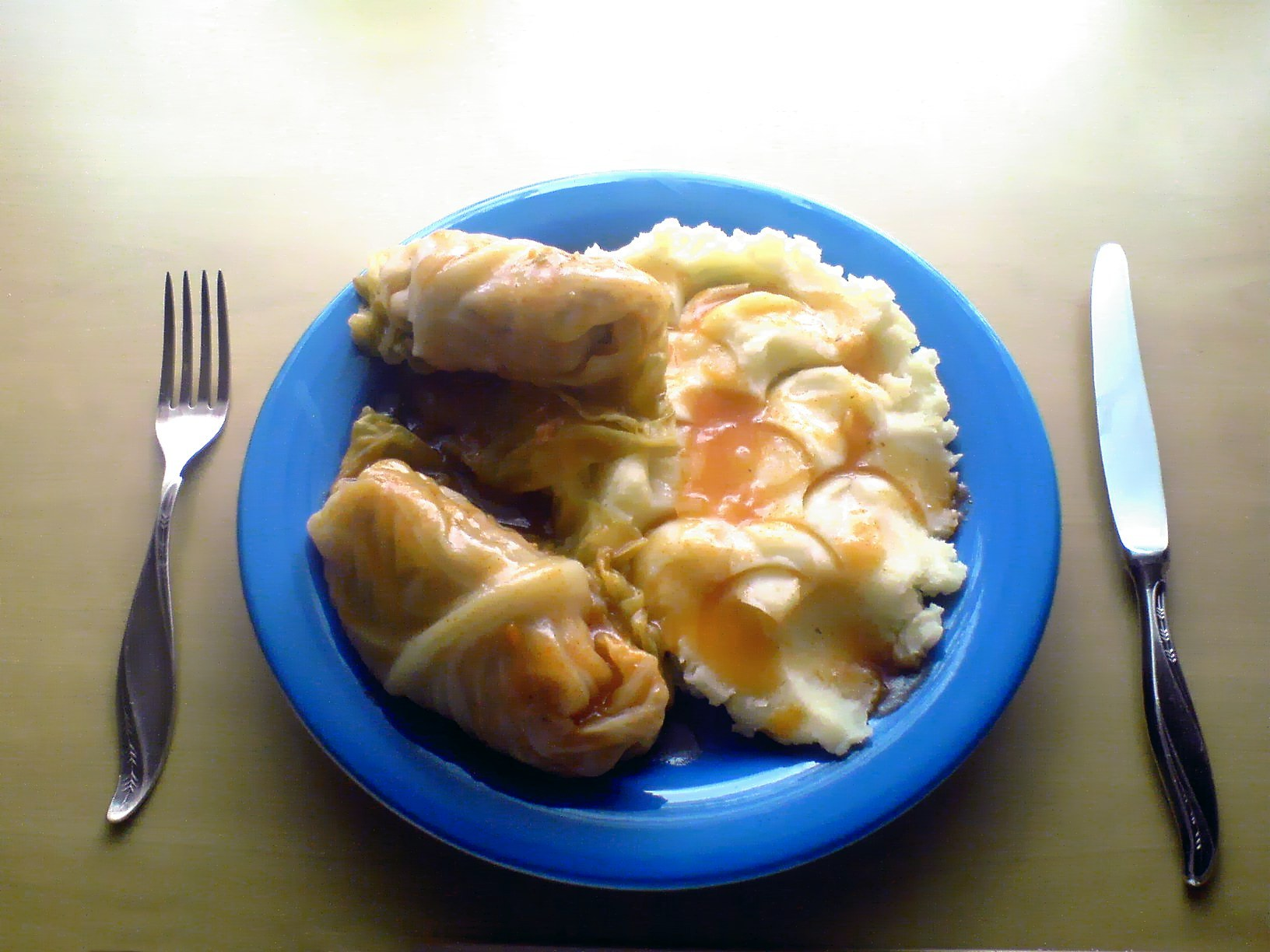
Cabbage rolls, Gołąbki variant, served with mashed potatoes and lecsó sauce

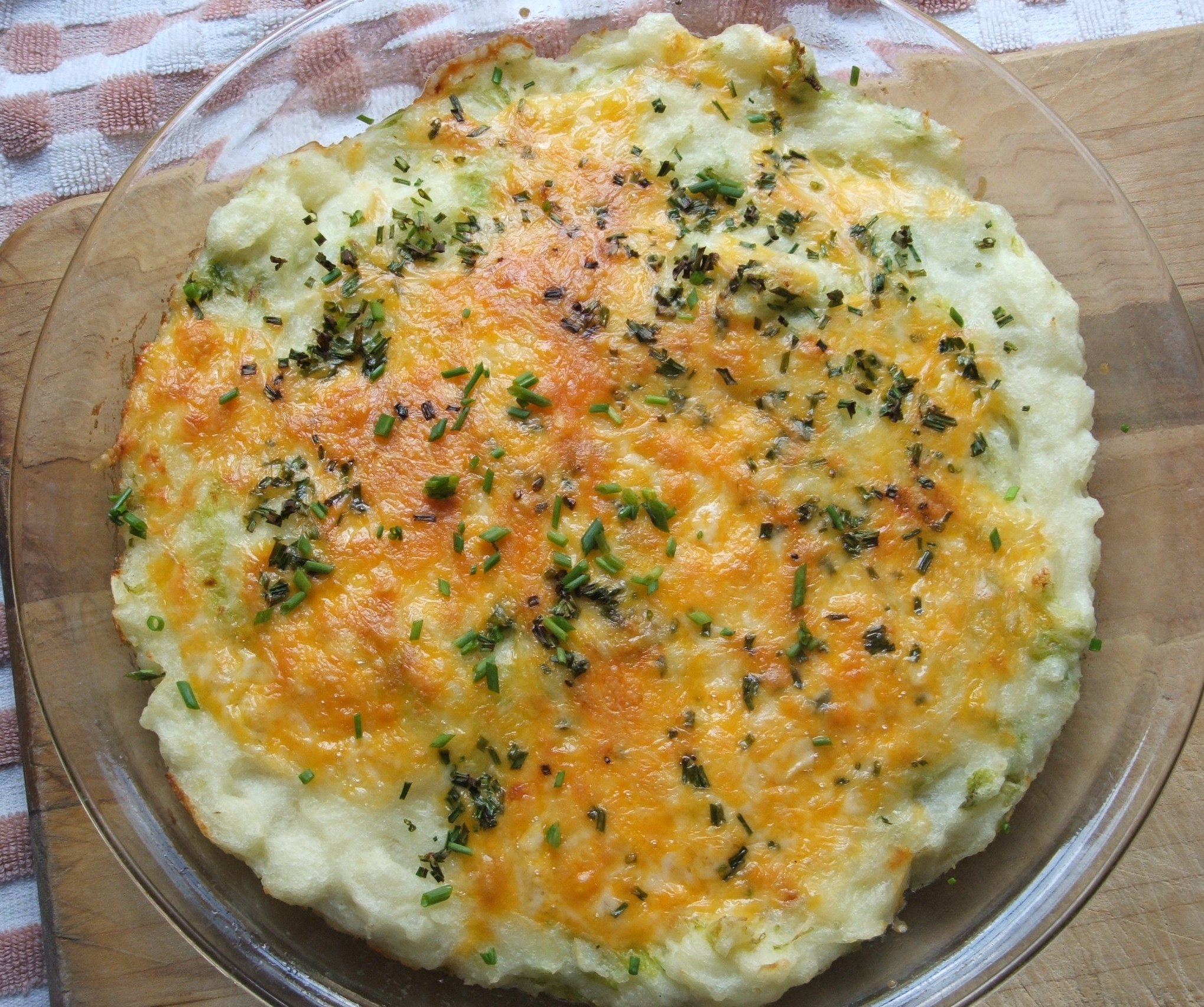
Rumbledethumps

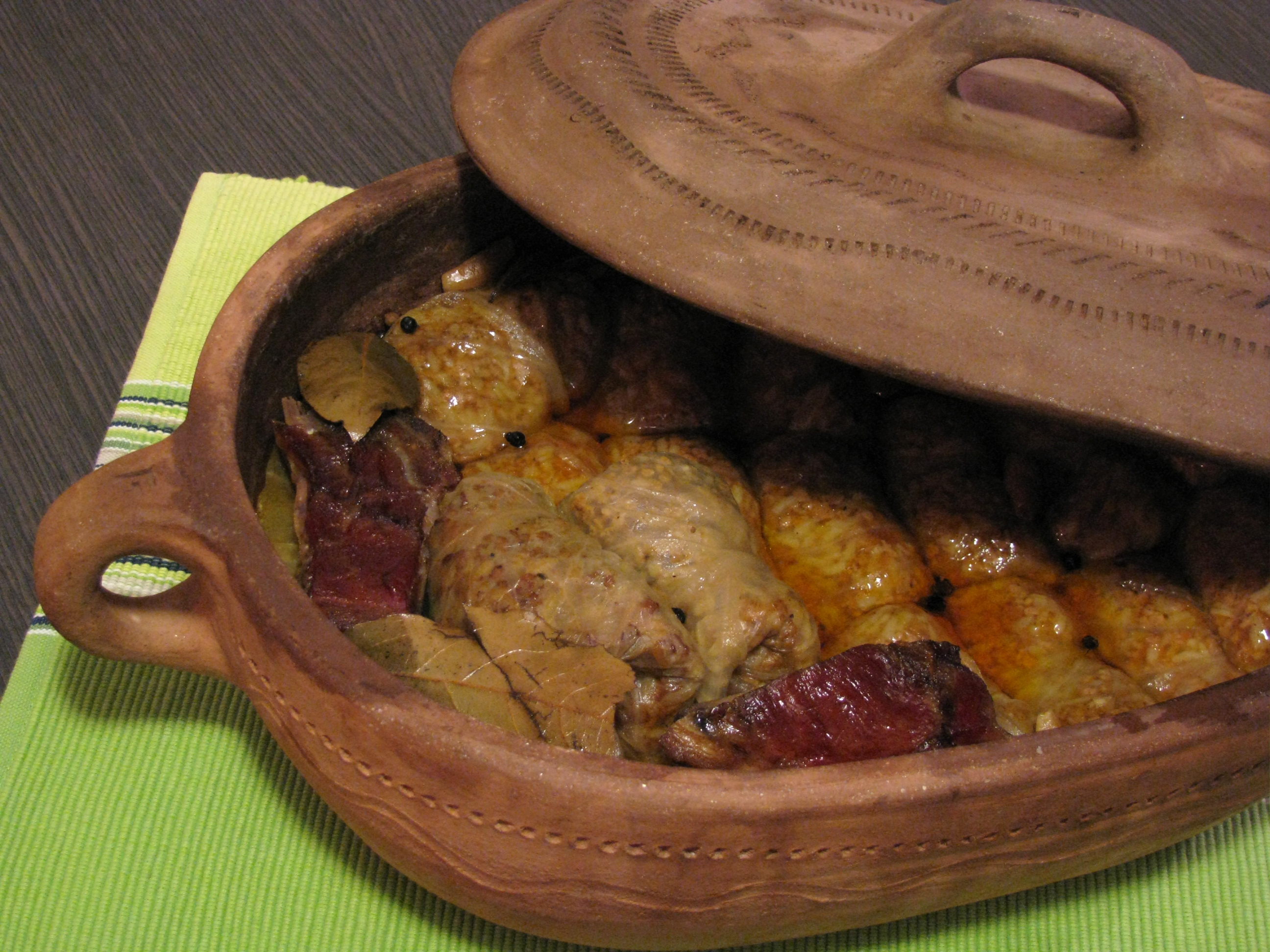
Serbian sarma prepared in a grne

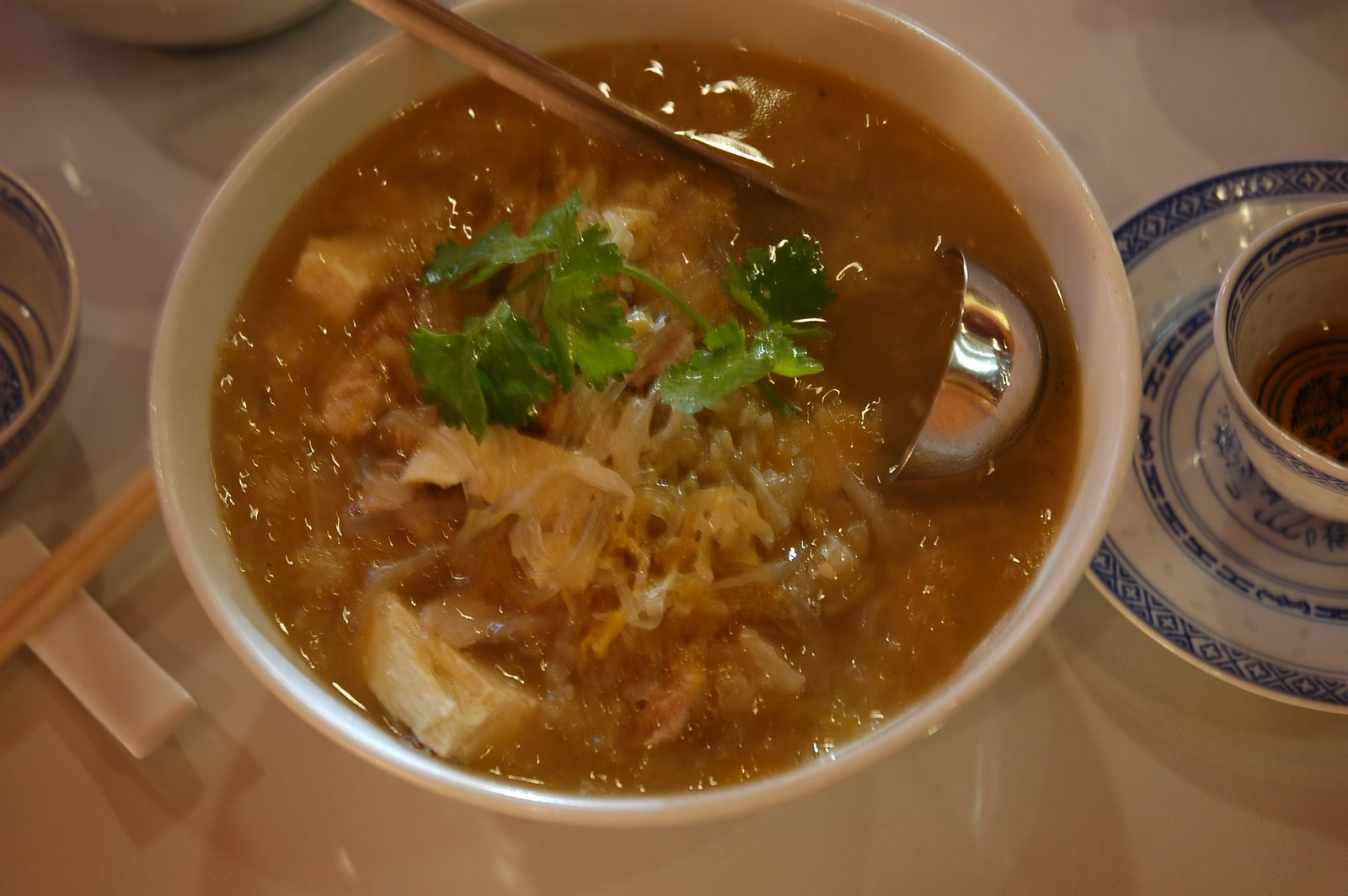
A soup of suan cai stewed with pork and cellophane noodles. It is a very common dish in Northeastern China.

== Cabbage-based foods ==
- Curtido
- Sauerkraut
- Sour cabbage
- Suan cai – a traditional Chinese pickled Chinese cabbage, used for a variety of purposes. Suan cai is a unique form of pao cai, due to the ingredients used and the method of production.
- Tianjin preserved vegetable
Cabbage-based foods

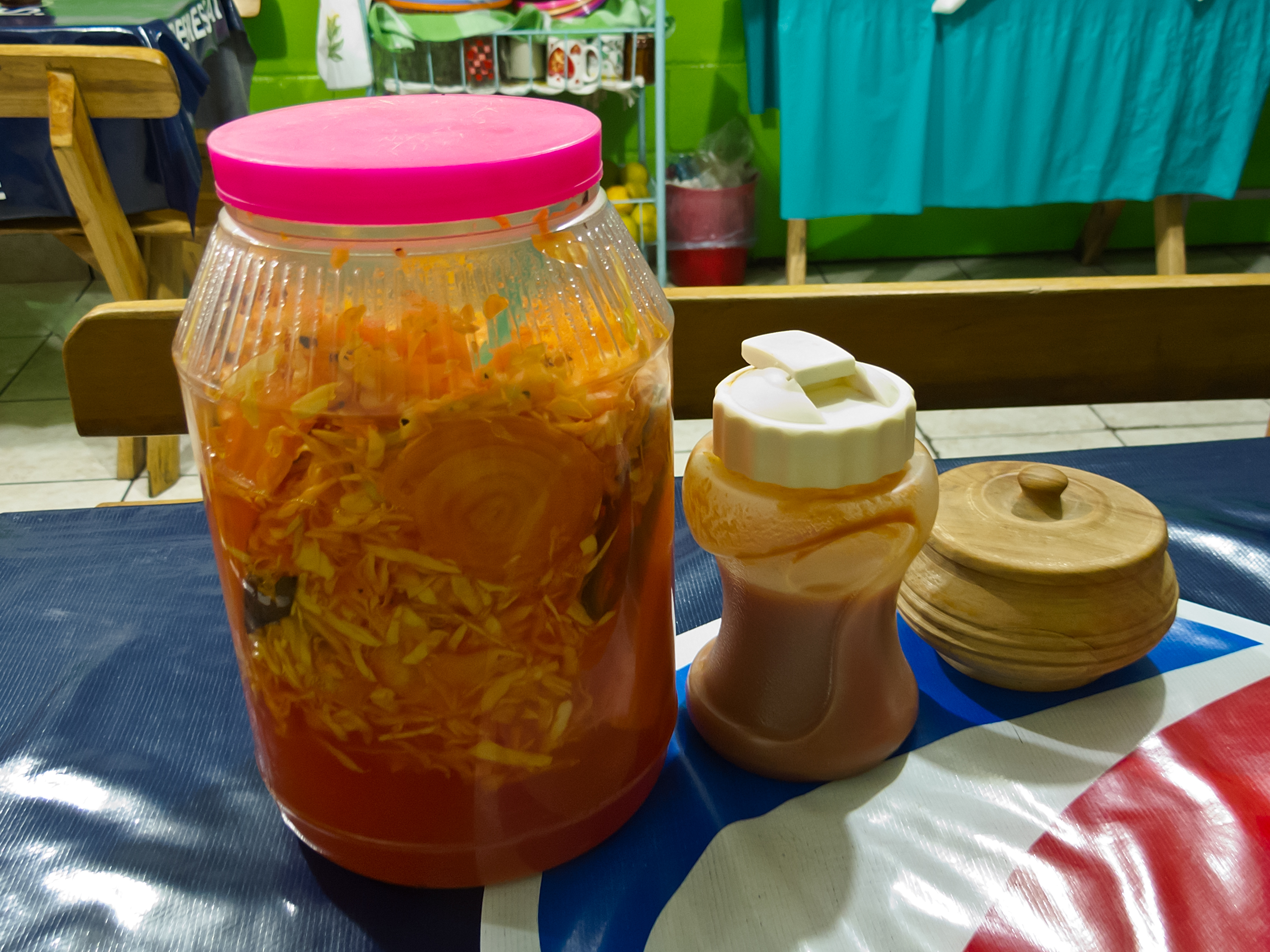
Curtido (left)

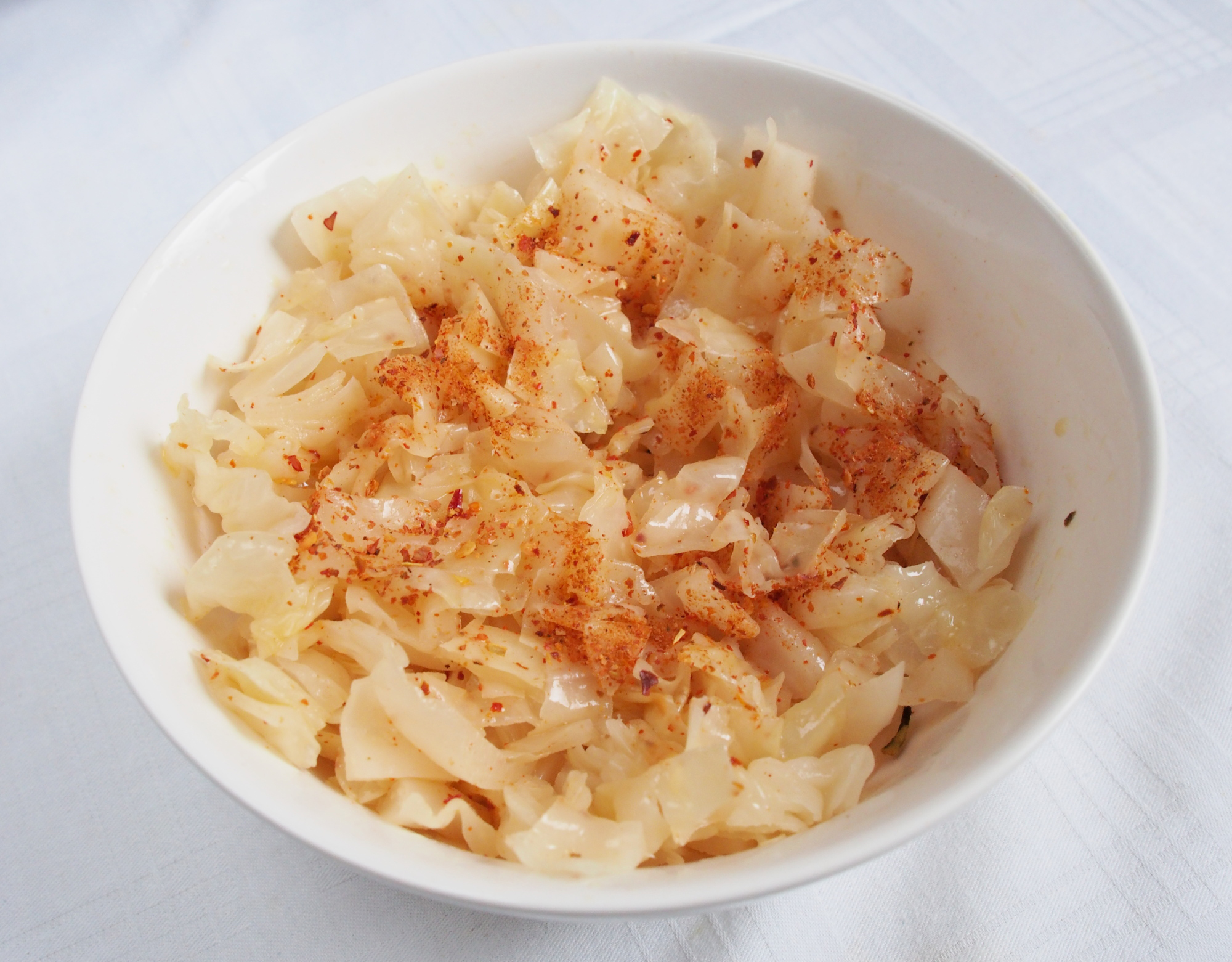
Sour cabbage

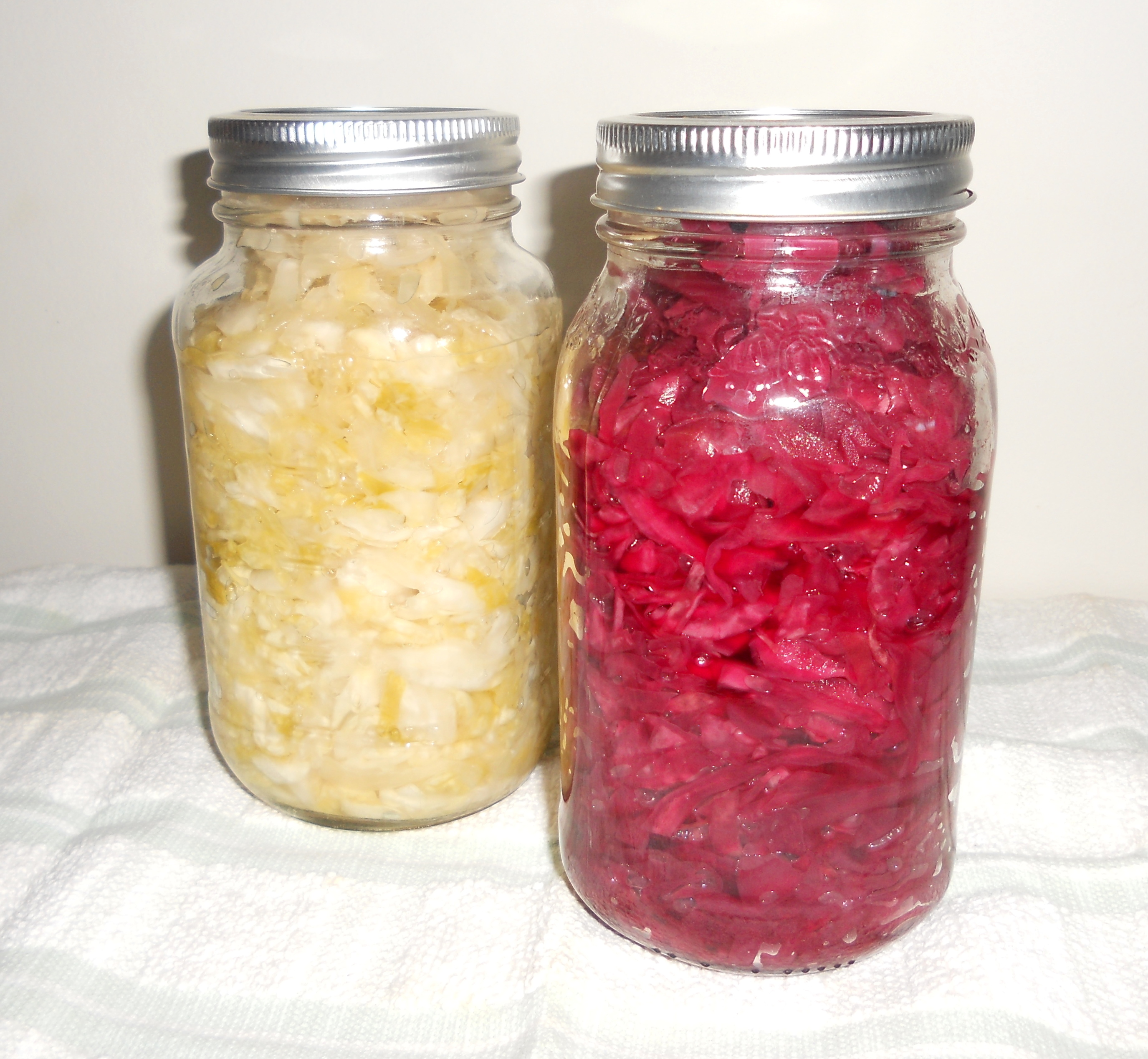
Homemade sauerkraut

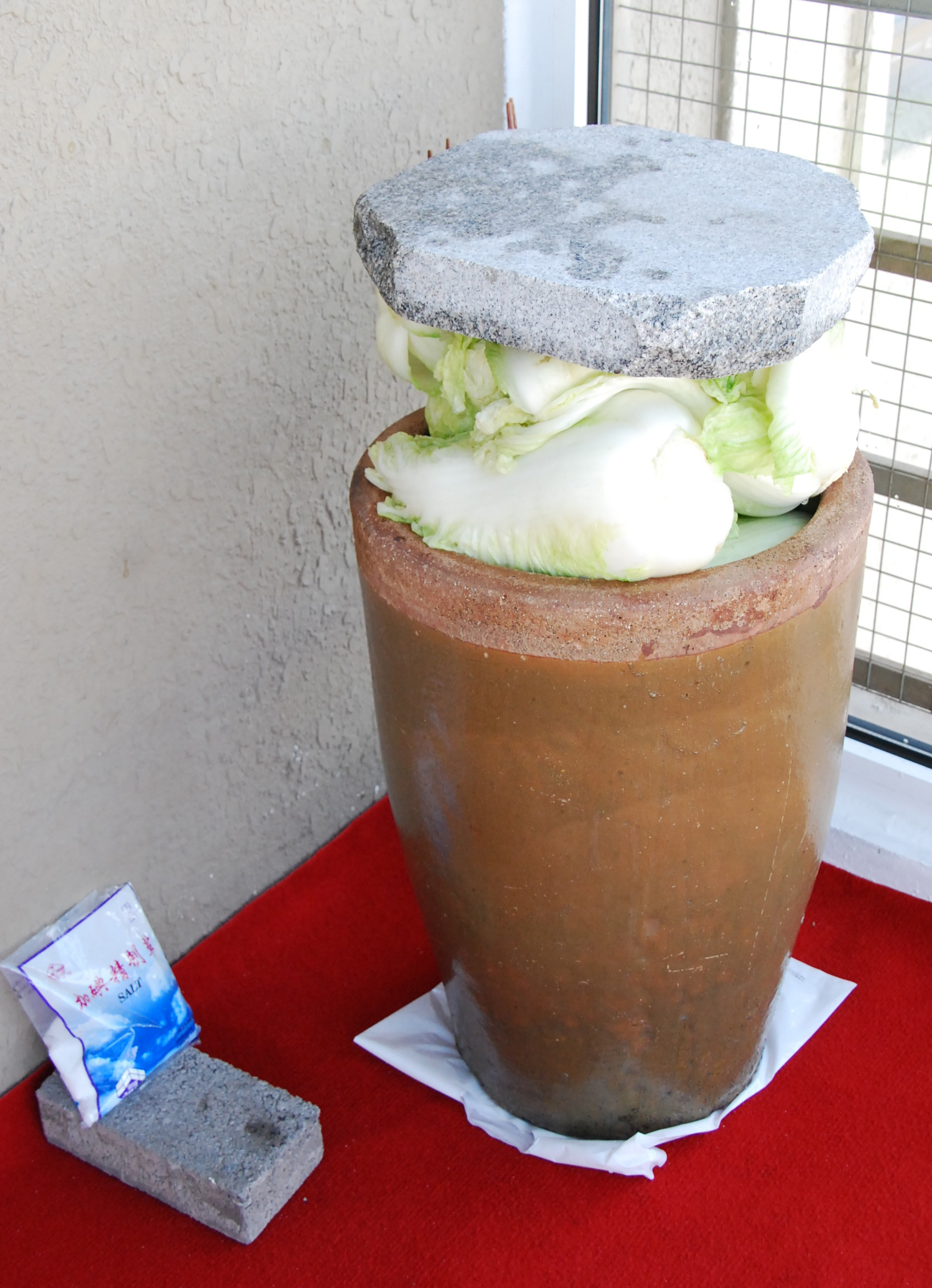
Suan cai preparation – a heavy stone is placed atop Chinese cabbages in a large pot. The cabbage will sink naturally in a few weeks as the fermentation begins. Salt, seen in the plastic bag in the lower left corner, is usually the only additive used.

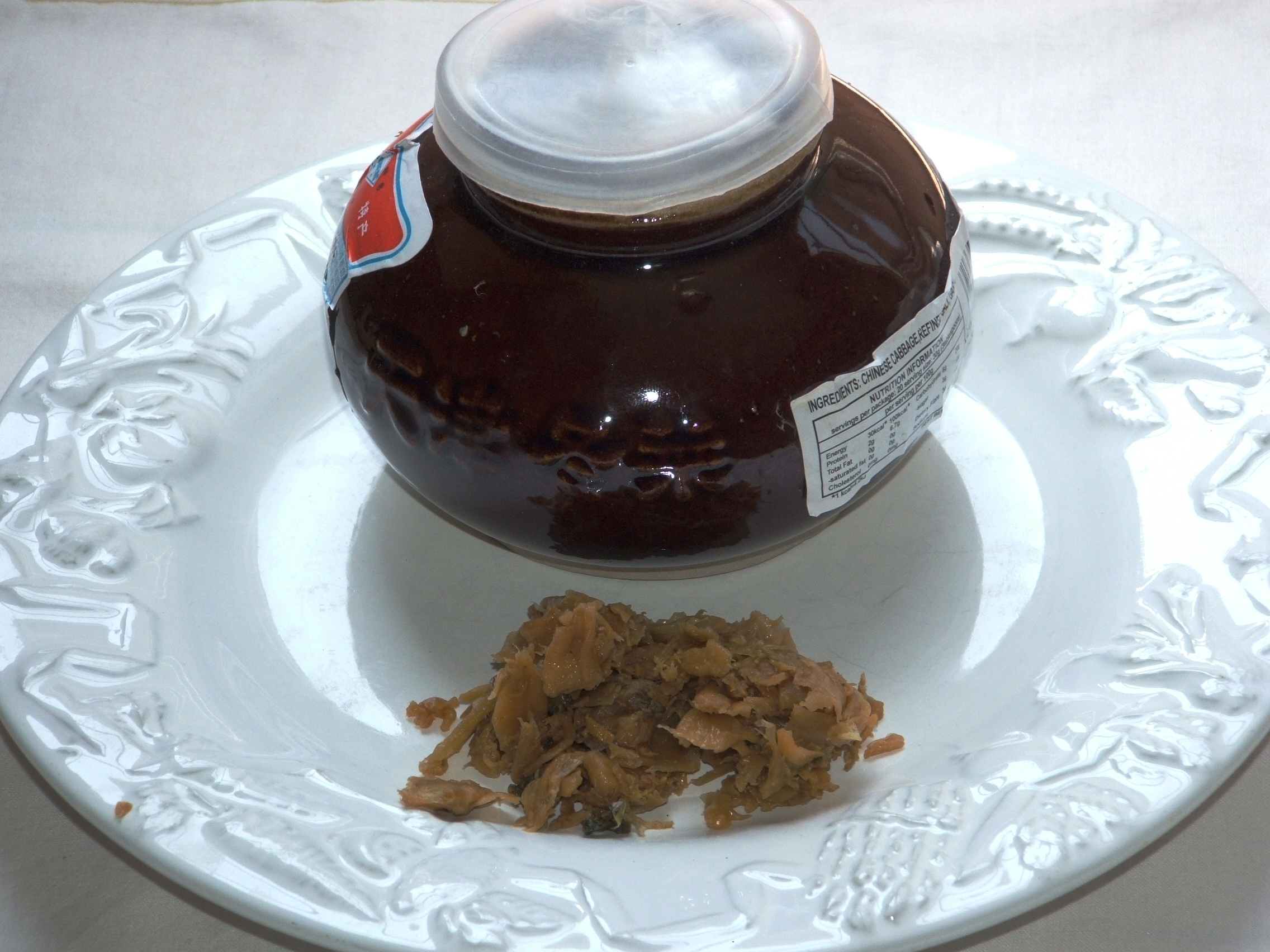
A jar of Tianjin preserved vegetable

== See also ==
- List of vegetable dishes
- Lists of prepared foods
