= Cabbage roll =

Dish of cabbage leaves with a filling

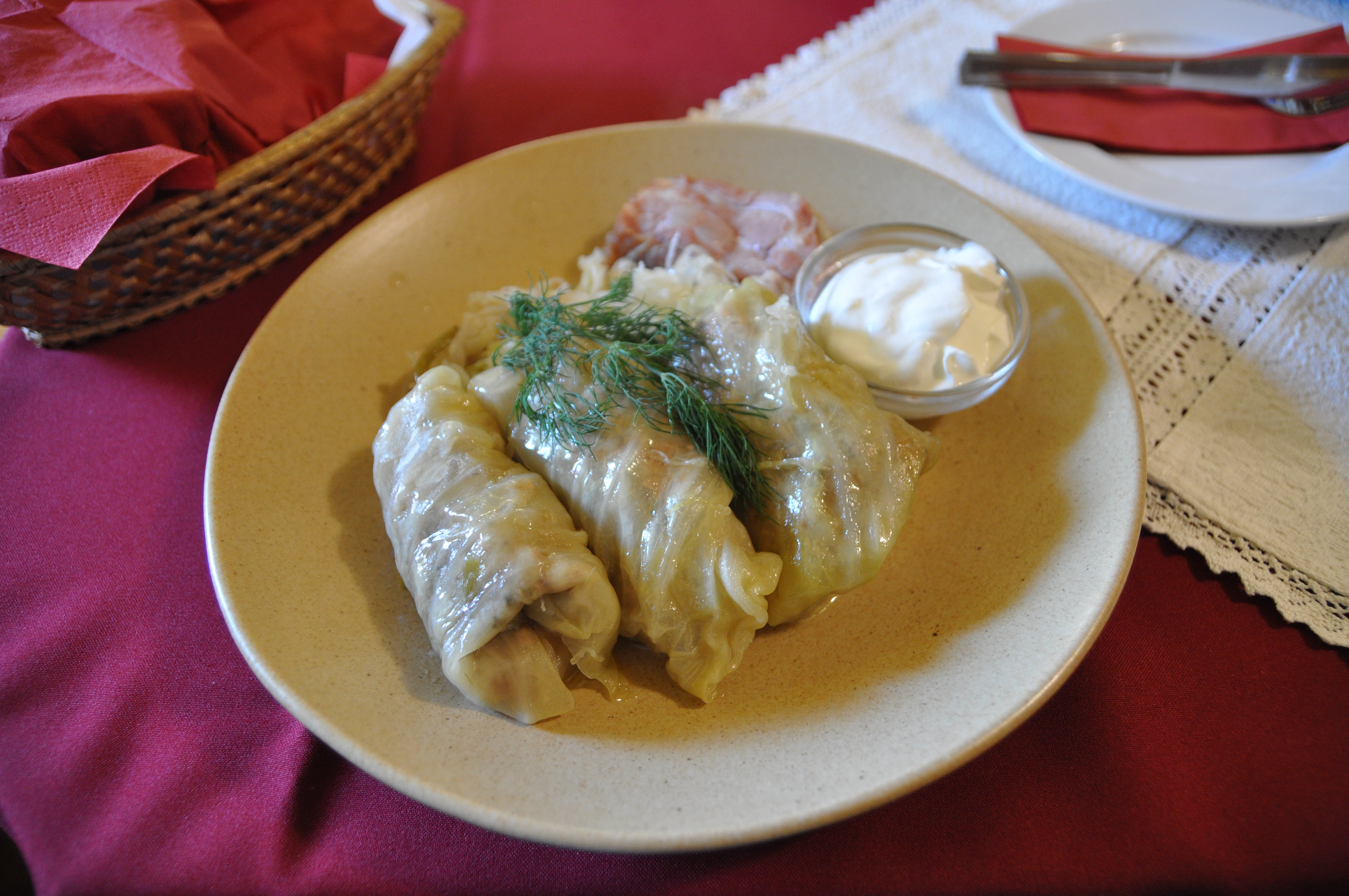
Hungarian cabbage rolls

A cabbage roll is a dish consisting of cooked cabbage leaves wrapped around a variety of fillings. It is common to the cuisines of Central, Eastern, and Southeastern Europe and much of Western Asia, Northern China, and parts of North Africa. Meat fillings are traditional in Europe, and include beef, lamb, or pork seasoned with garlic, onion, and spices. Grains such as rice and barley, mushrooms, and vegetables are often included as well. Fermented cabbage leaves are used for wrapping, particularly in southeastern Europe. In Asia, seafood, tofu, and shiitake mushrooms may also be used. Chinese cabbage is often used as a wrapping.

Cabbage leaves are stuffed with the filling and then baked, simmered, or steamed in a covered pot and generally eaten warm, often accompanied with a sauce. The sauce varies widely by cuisine. In Sweden and Finland, stuffed cabbage is served with lingonberry jam, which is both sweet and tart. In Central and Eastern Europe, tomato-based sauces and sour cream are typical. In Lebanon, the cabbage is stuffed with rice and minced meat and only rolled to the size of a cigar. It is usually served with a side dish of yogurt and a type of lemon and olive oil vinaigrette seasoned with garlic and dried mint.

The cabbage roll is a staple in Romanian cuisine, with variations of the recipe and sizing depending on the region, but typically taking up to six hours to cook. Traditionally made with pork, beef, bacon, rice, spices and aromatics, the cabbage rolls are broiled in a tomato sauce and served with polenta, sour cream and spicy pickled peppers.

Cooking textbook author Nancy Krcek stated that the origins of the dish are unclear and that it is possible multiple groups of people invented it at the same time. Another cooking book author, Malgorzata Caprari, stated it is believed that credit is owed to the poorer inhabitants of Central and Eastern European countries. Due to the widespread cultivation of cabbage in these regions, it is likely the cultures who inhabited them were the original inventors of this dish.

Cabbage rolls have found their way into popular culture, becoming one of the most recognizable dishes in Central and Eastern European cuisine. They often appear in literature and films as a symbol of homey comfort and tradition.

A version called holishkes is traditionally eaten by Jews on Simchat Torah. Recipes vary depending on region; for example, northern Poles prefer a savory sauce, while Galicia, Hungary and Ukraine favor sweet-and-sour.

In Asia, cabbage rolls have been adapted into various regional cuisines. In China, they are sometimes prepared with a filling of minced pork, shrimp, and vegetables, seasoned with soy sauce, ginger, and sesame oil, then steamed or simmered in a light broth. A similar dish exists in Japan, known as ロールキャベツ (rōru kyabetsu), often stuffed with ground meat and simmered in a tomato-based or dashi broth.

== Variations ==
- Lahana dolması/sarması – Turkey
- Lahanodolmades (Λαχανοντολμάδες) – Greece
- Farcellets de col – Catalonia
- Сарма (sarma) – North Macedonia
- Сарма (sarma) – Bulgaria
- Сарма / sarma – Serbia
- Japrak or sarma (sarma me lakër të bardhë) – Albania
- Sarma / Сарма or japrak / Јапрак – Bosnia and Herzegovina
- Punjeni kupus or arambašići or sarma – Croatia
- Töltött káposzta, szárma or sarma – Hungary
- Sarmale – Romania, Moldova
- Sarma (Crimea, Ukraine)
- Halubcy – Belarus
- Golubtsy (Голубцы) – Russia
- Gołąbki – Poland
- Holubci (Голубці) – Ukraine
- Balandėliai – Lithuania
- Kāpostu tīteņi – Latvia
- Holubky – Czech Republic and Slovakia
- Holishkes – Ashkenazi Jewish
- Prakas – Ashkenazi Jewish
- Krouv memula (כרוב ממולא) – Israel
- Kåldolmar – Sweden
- Kaalikääryle – Finland
- Kapsarull – Estonia
- Kələm dolması – Azerbaijan
- Kaghambi tolma (կաղամբի տոլմա) – Armenia
- Tolma (ტოლმა) – Georgia
- Dolmeye kalam (cabbage dolma) – Iran
- Malfoof mahshi (ملفوف محشي) – the Levant
- Mahashi malfoof (محاشي ملفوف) - The Arab states of the Gulf
- Mahshi kromb (محشى كرمب) – Egypt and Sudan
- Kohlroulade and Krautwickel – Germany and Austria
- Cigares au chou – Quebec
- Involtini di cavolo – Italy
- Capuns – Graubunden, Switzerland and Lombardy, Italy
- Capunet – Piedmont, Italy
- Bragioli – Malta
- Ouma onder die komberse or oupa se kouse - South Africa
- Niños envueltos – Sudamerica (Argentina, Chile, Uruguay)
- Charuto de repolho – Brazil
- Aluske – Paraná, Santa Catarina, and Rio Grande do Sul (Brazil)
- Bai cai juan (白菜卷) – China
- Rōru kyabetsu (ロールキャベツ) – Japan
- Kålruletter - Norway
- Cải bắp cuốn - Vietnam

=== Europe ===
==== Armenia ====
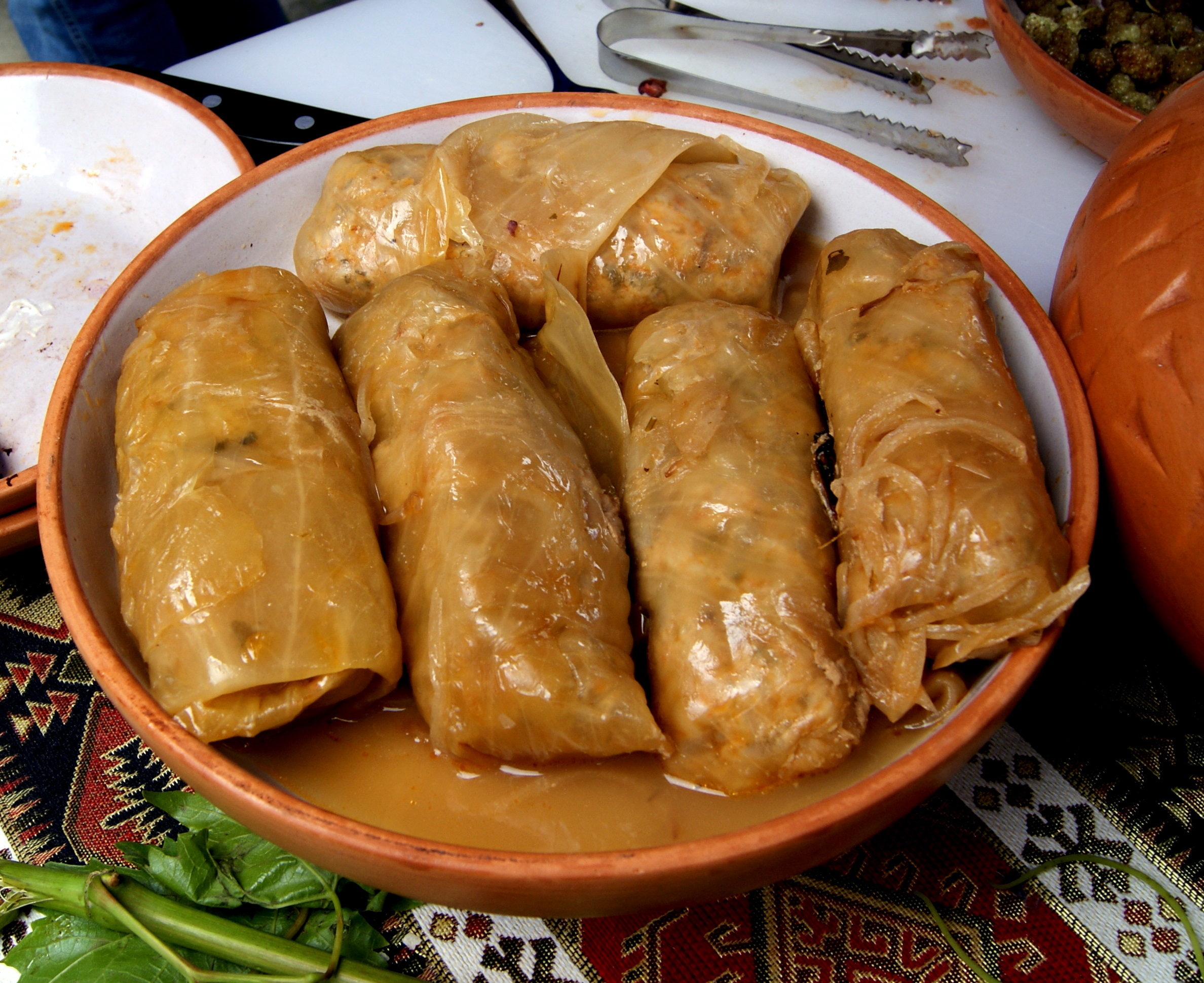
Armenian cabbage rolls

In Armenian cuisine, cabbage rolls are stuffed with beans and tart fruits. It is wrapped with cabbage leaves, and stuffed with red beans, chickpeas, lentils, cracked wheat, tomato paste, onion and multiple spices, mostly the spice mix of chaimen, which is also used to coat basturma. Cabbage rolls are called Pasuts tolma (պասուց տոլմա; Lenten dolma) in Armenian where they are made of seven different grains – chickpea, bean, lentil, cracked wheat, pea, rice and maize. Armenian cooks sometimes use rose hip syrup or grape syrup to flavor stuffed cabbage rolls.

==== Azerbaijan and Turkey ====
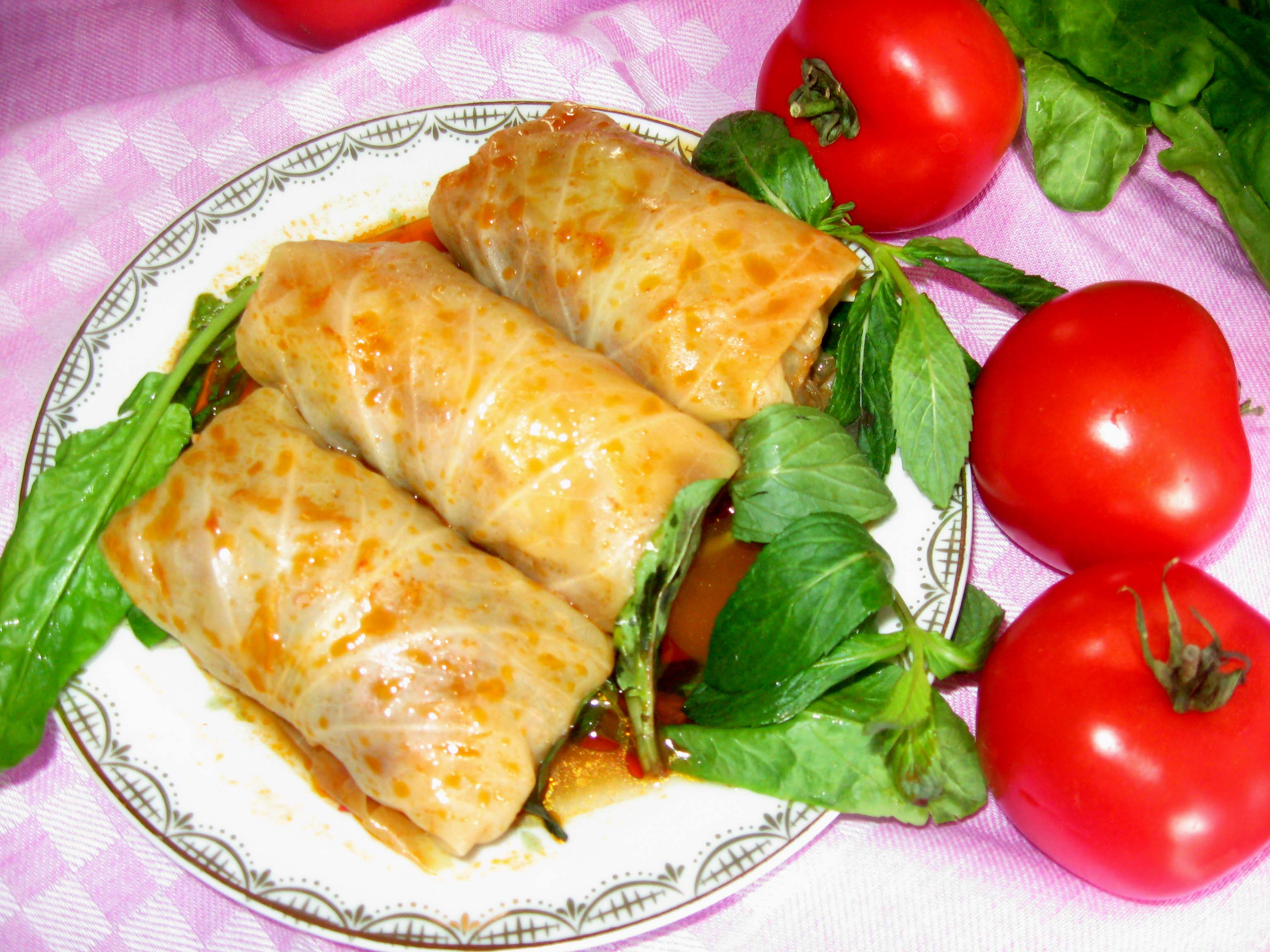
Azerbaijani cabbage roll (Azerbaijani: kələm dolması)

Stuffed cabbage leaves (Azerbaijani: kələm dolması; Turkish: lahana dolması) are popular all year in Azerbaijan and Turkey, but especially in winter when other vegetables are less plentiful. The stuffing usually consists of rice and herbs such as coriander, mint and dill, onions and meat, although there is a variation, yalançı dolma (Azerbaijani), yalancı dolma (Turkish) ("fake" dolma), which is meat-free.

==== Balkans ====
Cabbage rolls are a culinary standard in Turkey, Bulgaria, Greece, North Macedonia, Albania, Serbia, Montenegro, Bosnia and Herzegovina, Croatia, Slovenia, Romania, Moldova and Hungary. They are traditionally made with leaves of brined cabbage stuffed with ground beef, pork and rice, while meat can also be omitted or substituted with crushed walnuts, pine nuts and raisins. In Bulgaria, Romania, Hungary, and parts of Greece, cabbage rolls are a favorite dish during Christmas time and other non-fasting holidays. In some countries, such as Serbia, cabbage rolls are traditionally simmered at length in a paprika-based sauce with chunks of smoked bacon.

==== Romania and Moldova ====
In Romania, there are different variations and sizing depending on the region. Sarmale are Romanian stuffed cabbage rolls traditionally served on Christmas and New Year's Eve but also served throughout the year at weddings, baptism parties, and other large celebrations. It is considered a winter dish and starts with the orthodox celebration of St. Ignatie day – Preparing the Pig, when Romanians traditionally slaughter the pigs for Christmas. Ground pork or beef is mixed with sauteed caramelized onions and rice, stuffed in a cabbage leaf, pickled sauerkraut leaf or grape leaf. For flavor, they usually consist of layers with bacon, smoked ribs, or smoked sausage. Seasoned with spices and aromatics, it is traditionally served with polenta, sour cream and pickled spicy peppers.

==== Hungary ====
Töltött káposzta, szárma or sarma, the traditional Hungarian cabbage roll, can be made from sweet or sauerkraut cabbage leaves filled with a mixture of minced pork meat (or sometimes turkey), eggs, onions, and rice seasoned with caraway, salt, and pepper. In Alföld region is called takart. The Hungarian version often contains minced paprika and is served with sour cream on top. It used to be seasoned with saffron. Many Hungarians serve this food during Christmas and New Year's Eve, although it is a common dish throughout the year (a sweet version during summer and fall, and a sour version during winter and spring). The sour stuffed cabbage is part of the traditional Hungarian pig slaughter menu and it is said that eating this during the holiday season will bring wealth and health for the new year.

There are many regional variations: in Kárpátalja and Nyírség, for example, they make small töltött káposzta for weddings.

Although the rolling up of cabbages was first mentioned in the 1695 book of Miklós Tótfalusi Kis, a similar dish, káposztás hús (not to be confused with székelykáposzta), was known long before it.

Káposztás hús was very popular. This traditional cabbage stew had a special significance to Hungarian people. The 17th-century manuscript cookbook of the Csáktornya court, written sometime before 1662, begins its list of dishes with the phrase, "The cabbage meat is the coat of arms of Hungary". "In the old days, there was no dish more suitable for Hungarians than cabbage", said Péter Apor, praising it as the meal of the lords. Around 1730, Mátyás Bél also called "Cabbage with bacon, the coat of arms of Hungary". Lippay also calls it the "coat of arms of Hungary" and states that Hungarian people cannot live without it. Kelemen Mikes, when traveling to Turkey, also writes back, "The beautifully written letter pleases the mind, as do these cabbages with dill and sour cream". Mikes also finds it fitting for a coat of arms: "Even if I had no other praise to say about it, is it not enough to say that it is the Transylvanian coat of arms?"

The cabbage roll itself also appears as a motif in the culture. In Zsigmond Móricz's short story "Tragedy", the protagonist János Kis dies while eating stuffed cabbage, of which he had vowed to eat fifty.

==== Poland ====
Stuffed cabbage rolls are a popular Polish dish. Pork and beef mixed with rice or barley are nestled in a cabbage leaf and cooked in the oven or on the stove until tender.

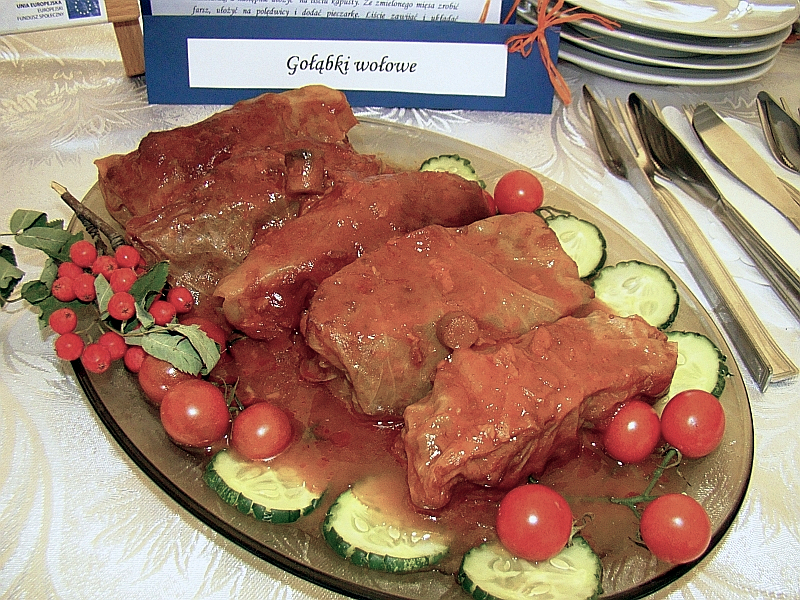
Gołąbki in tomato sauce

The cabbage rolls are called gołąbki in Polish, holubky by Czechs and Slovaks, or sarma / сарма by Serbs, Croatians and Bulgarians. The sauce is often the main difference in regional variations. In a less popular version called leniwe gołąbki (lazy cabbage rolls) the ingredients are chopped, combined and baked or fried.

==== Ukraine ====
In Ukraine, the filling of holubtsi varies throughout the country. In the Carpathian region corn grits are used, whereas in the Poltava area buckwheat groats are preferred. The cereal is lightly cooked, mixed with fried onions, shkvarky (pork cracklings) or raw minced meat. The mixture is combined with spices and seasonings, and is then used as the filling for steamed fresh or pickled cabbage leaves. In spring cabbage leaves are often replaced with fresh beetroot leaves, and in the southwest – with fresh young grape leaves. The holubtsi are lightly fried and then stewed with sour cream, or tomato, mushroom or some other sauce. During Lenten periods this might be water mixed with kvas, while at other times it might be a meat broth.

In Left Bank Ukraine and in the south, holubtsi are usually big, made from the entire cabbage leaf, while in the Dniester region and the Carpathians the cabbage leaf is divided into several pieces. In the latter regions, cooks who made large holubtsi were considered lazy. In Poltava cooks preferred the large holubtsi because they were juicier. In most of Ukraine holubtsi were an everyday dish, but in most of Right Bank Ukraine, with the exception of Polissia, they were also included in holiday meals. Beginning in the 1920s, holubtsi began to be stuffed with a rice-meat mixture, and, instead of kvas, they began to be cooked in tomato juice, sauce or paste. This is the most common way they are prepared nowadays.

Holubtsi are a popular dish for both everyday meals and as special occasion treats. For Sviata Vecheria (Christmas Eve supper) in many regions of Ukraine, holubtsi constitute one of the twelve traditional dishes served on the night. Only Lenten ingredients are used in this case. On occasion of Sviata Vecheria, Boykos and Transcarpathians make holubtsi from "kryzhavky" (pickled whole heads of cabbage). Into these "pickled" holubtsi they put a stuffing of rice and mushrooms. Carpathian-style holubtsi are usually made from fresh cabbage and stuffed with corn grits, or with grated raw potato (vorokhta, verkhovyna, kvasy). These are best served with mushroom gravy. To differentiate the different types of holubtsi, they are wrapped into different shapes: corn-filled ones are made into the shape of envelopes, with the edges folded in, potato-filled are simply rolled up. A classic Halychian (Galician) Sviata Vecheria dish is holubtsi stuffed with grated potato and served with a mushroom machanka (dipping sauce).

On 4 May 2023, the cooking of holubtsi, a Ukrainian traditional dish, was inscribed in the National Inventory of Elements of the Intangible Cultural Heritage of Ukraine.

==== Russia ====
The Russian version of cabbage rolls usually consists of minced meat mixed with cooked rice (or buckwheat) wrapped in cabbage leaves and stewed in a mixture of either sour cream or tomato sauce or both.

There is an easier-to-make variation of that dish called lenivye golubtsy ("lazy" cabbage rolls): the cabbage is chopped and mixed with minced meat and rice so there is no need to wrap every meatball in a cabbage leaf.

Russians refer to the bell pepper variant of the dish as "perchiki" ("little peppers" - consistent with the pattern of forming food names using diminutives, despite the large size of bell peppers relative to other peppers).

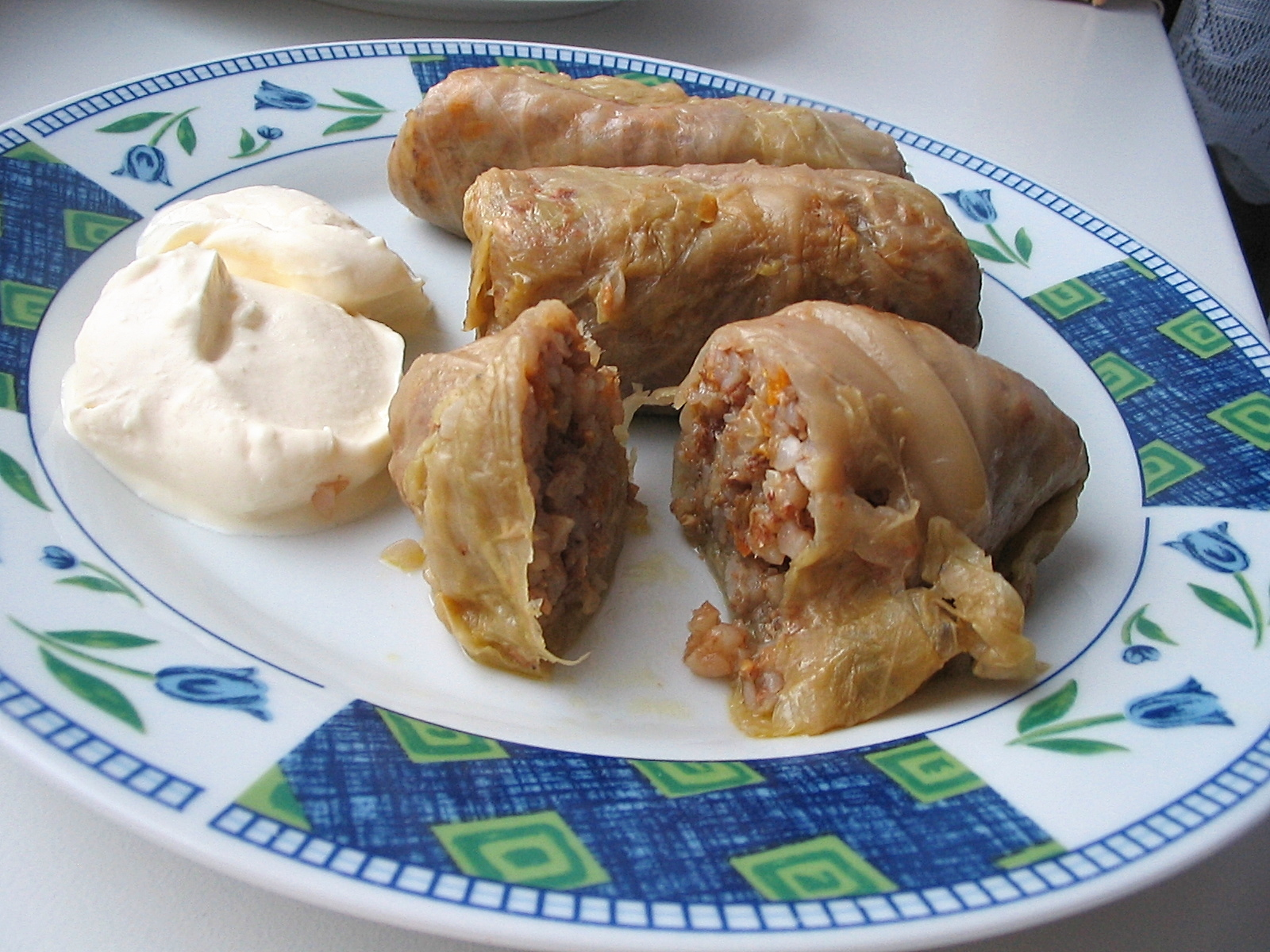
Golubtsi stuffed with buckwheat groats, served with smetana

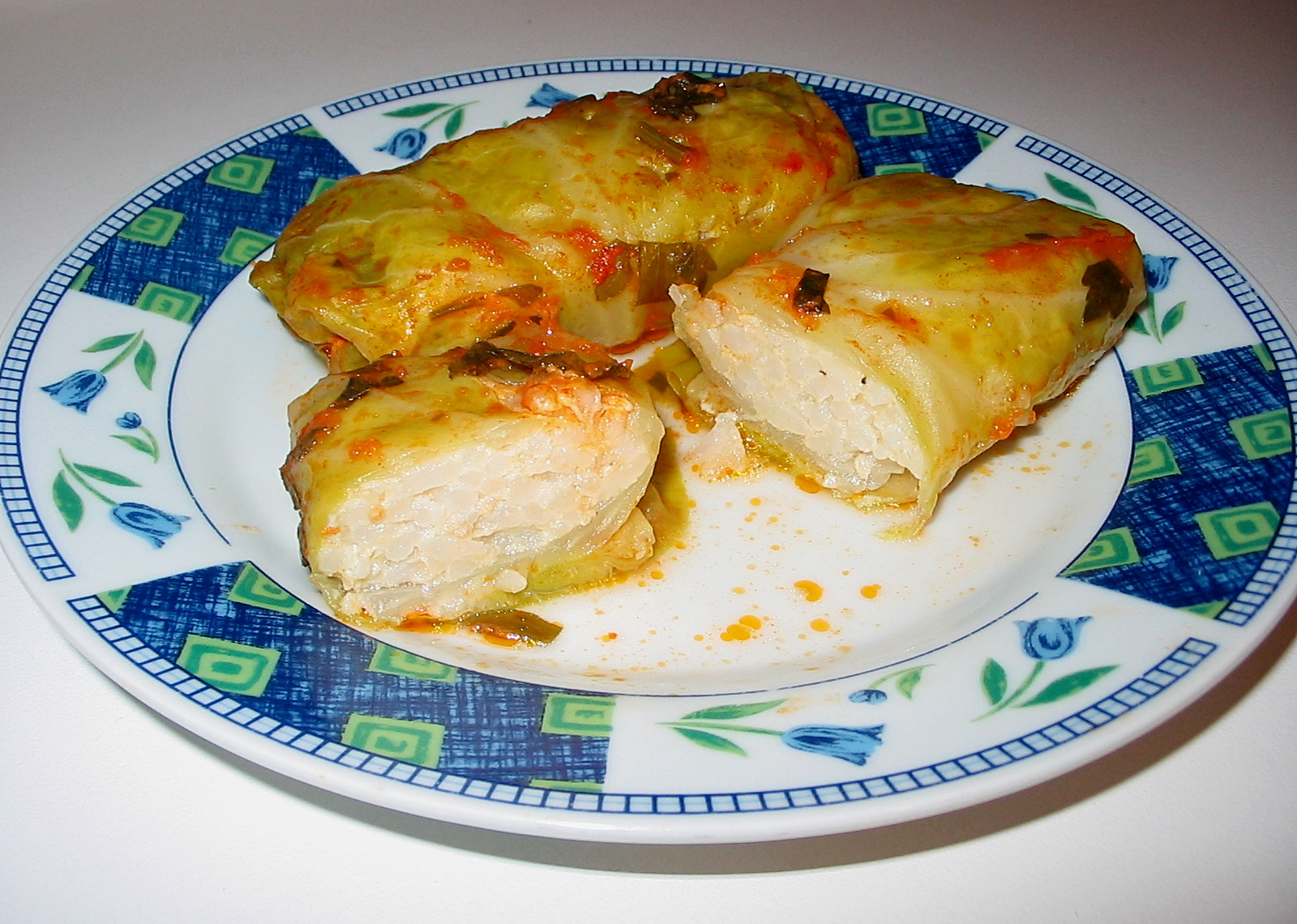
Golubtsi stuffed with rice and meat mixture

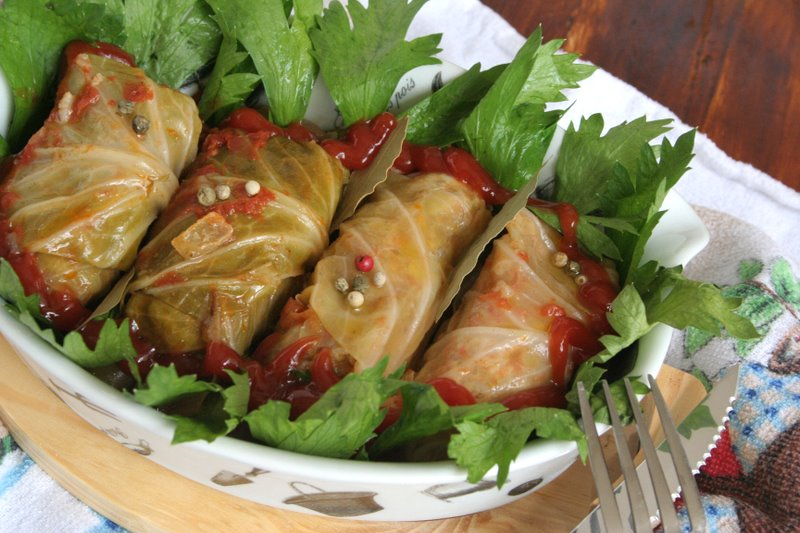
Jewish holishkes are similar to the dishes described above

==== Sweden and Finland ====
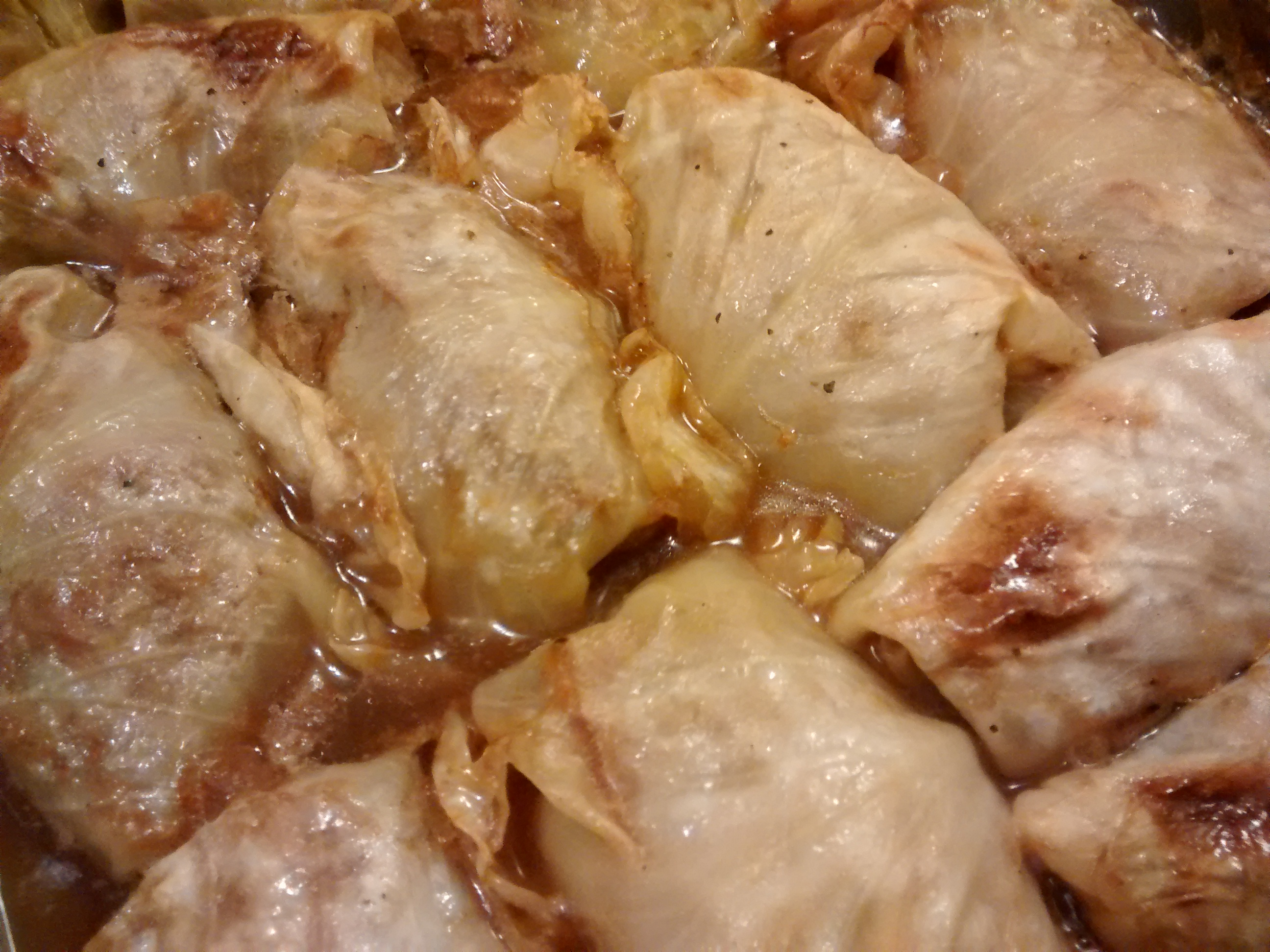
Kåldolmar

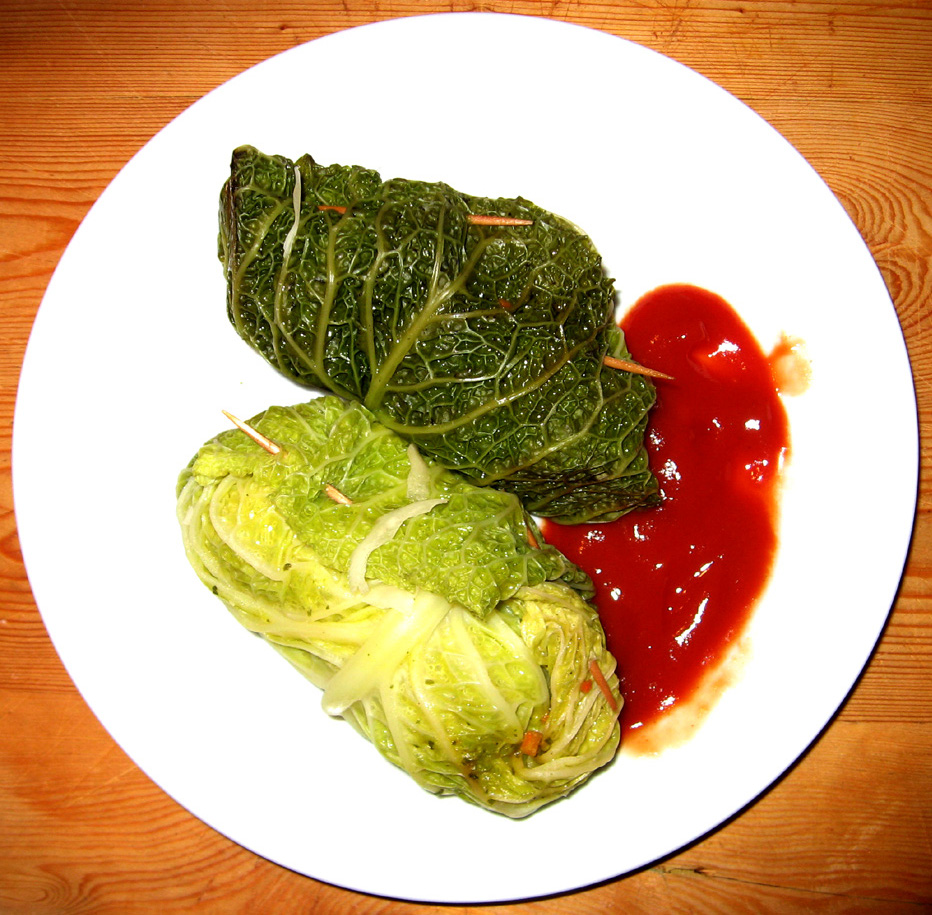
German Wirsingrouladen made using savoy cabbage leaves

Kåldolmar ("cabbage dolma") are Swedish cabbage rolls filled with rice and minced meat (most often pork). They are traditionally eaten with boiled or mashed potatoes, gravy, and lingonberry jam. In Finland the same dish is known as kaalikääryle (plural kaalikääryleet).

In 1709, after losing the Battle of Poltava, the wounded Charles XII of Sweden and the remnants of his army escaped with their Cossack allies to the Ottoman town of Bender, in present-day Moldavia, where they were granted refuge by Sultan Ahmed III. Charles XII spent more than five years in the Ottoman Empire, trying to convince the Sultan to help him defeat the Russians. When he finally returned to Sweden in 1715, he was followed by his Ottoman creditors and their cooks. The creditors remained in Sweden at least until 1732; it is generally believed that Ottoman style dolma were introduced into Swedish cooking during this period.

As indicated by the name, Swedish kåldolmar are generally considered a variety of the dolma.

The earliest known Swedish recipe for "Dolma" is in the 1765 edition of the famous cookbook of Cajsa Warg. Warg instructed her readers to prepare the rolls using vine leaves, lamb, rice, and lemon juice. Toward the end of the recipe, however, Warg suggested that those who could not afford vine leaves could use preboiled cabbage leaves in their place. Nowadays, frozen kåldolmar, cooked with preboiled cabbage leaves, are sold in most major food stores in Sweden.

To cherish early modern cultural interchange between Sweden and the Orient, the Cabbage Dolma Day (Kåldolmens dag) is celebrated on 30 November, the day Charles XII was killed during a military campaign in Norway. The celebrations were instated in 2010 by a group known as the Friends of the Cabbage Dolma (Kåldolmens vänner). In a series of media appearances, historian Petter Hellström explained that the group wanted to make 30 November a day to remember and ponder the multifaceted roots of Sweden's cultural heritage, apparently in contrast to the same day's long history as the unofficial marching day of Swedish fascism and right-wing extremism. Starting in 2013, the Cabbage Dolma Day was hosted by the Swedish History Museum in Stockholm, the country's foremost historical museum. The celebrations have also been supported by a number of important civil society organizations over the years, notably the Church of Sweden and the Federation of Local History and Folk Culture (Sveriges hembygdsförbund).

=== Africa ===
==== Egypt ====
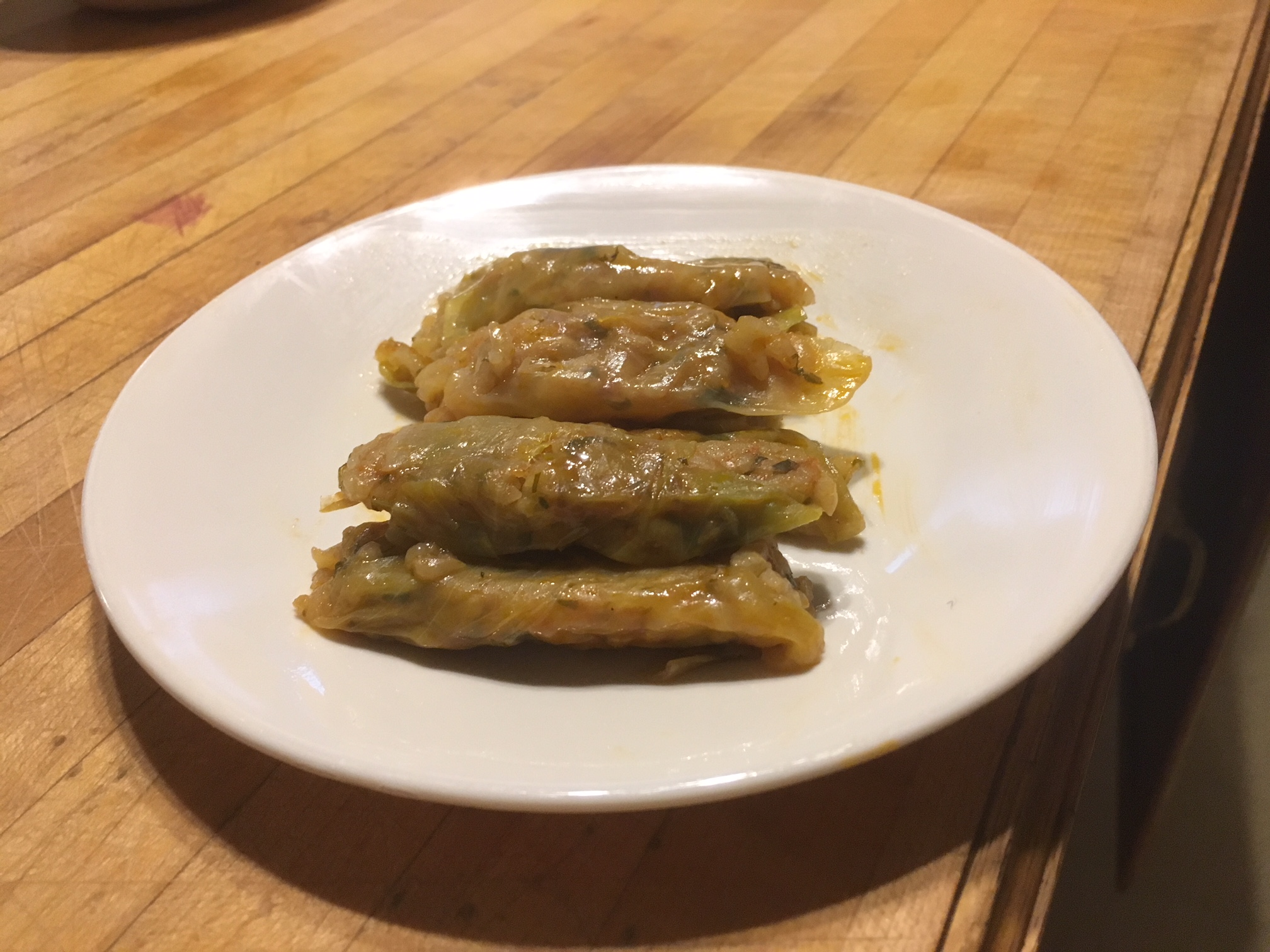
Mahshi kromb (Egyptian-style cabbage rolls)

In Egyptian cuisine, cabbage rolls are called maḥshī kromb or maḥshī kronb (Egyptian Arabic: محشي كرمب or محشي كرنب), literally translating to "stuffed cabbage". The leaves are fresh and commonly cut into smaller pieces and partially pre-cooked. The most common filling is a mixture of rice, onion, tomato, herbs, and spices (most typically including mint, dill, and cumin); meat is rarely used in Egyptian stuffed cabbage. The rolls are arranged in a pot and boiled in broth or tomato-based sauce, also including the herbs and spices. As the pieces of cabbage and therefore the rolls are small, the leaves are usually simply rolled around the filling almost like a small cigar, and are left open at the ends rather than folded around the filling to produce a completely enclosed package.

=== Americas ===
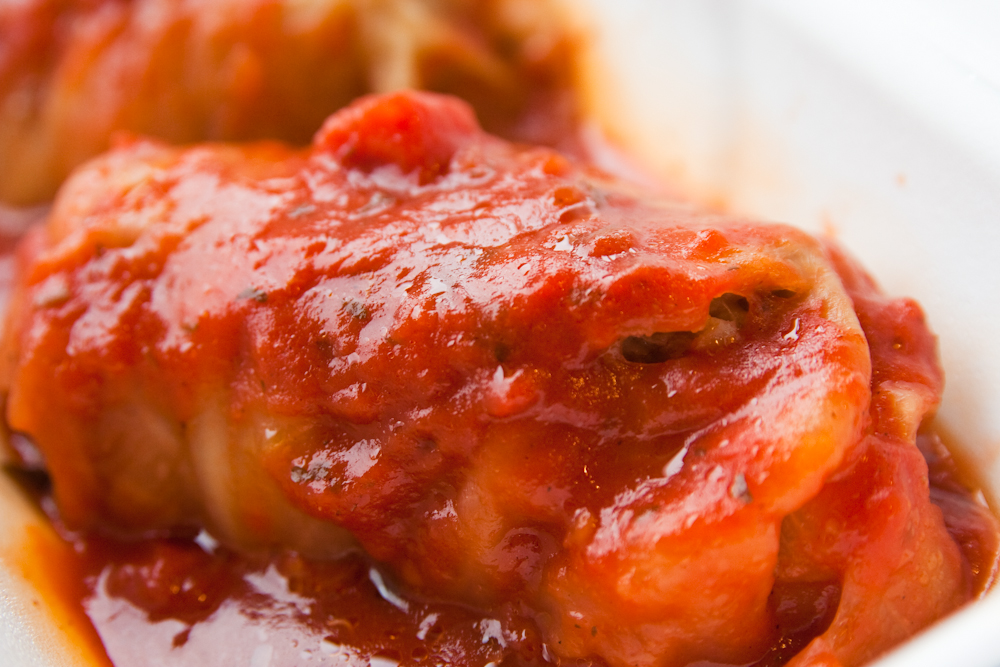
Polish-style gołąbki served in Grand Rapids, Michigan

==== United States ====
In regions heavily influenced by Polish immigrants, such as Chicago which claims the largest Polish population outside of Poland, Detroit, Pennsylvania, the southern tier of New York, and northeastern Ohio, Jewish cabbage usually refers instead to stuffed cabbage rolls, such as the Polish gołąbki. These are also known as pigs in a blanket, but this term is not very well known outside of Illinois. Jewish immigrants from Eastern Europe popularized the dish in New York City, which is why they became known as Jewish cabbage. Jewish cabbage soared to nationwide popularity during the 1970s, when economic circumstances paired with an interest in a healthier lifestyle made the dish a perfect staple on the dinner table for American families.

Cabbage rolls also feature prominently in the cuisines of Cajuns and Louisiana Creoles of southern Louisiana, where they usually take the form of ground pork mixed with rice and chopped vegetables stuffed into parboiled cabbage leaves and cooked in a tomato sauce-based liquid.

Romani Americans, Hungarian Americans, Chinese Americans and Vietnamese Americans often cook cabbage rolls.

Romani people in the United States eat sarmi which is made with cabbage leaves stuffed with pork, onions, peppers, rice, and tomatoes.

=== Asia ===
==== China ====
In Chinese cuisine, cabbage rolls are called 白菜卷, pronounced báicài juǎn.

==== Levant ====
Cabbage rolls are popular across the Levant region. They are called malfouf (Arabic: ملفوف, romanized: malfūf, lit. 'cabbage') or malfouf mahshi (Arabic: ملفوف محشي, romanized: malfūf maḥshī, lit. 'stuffed cabbage'); they are typically stuffed with rice and minced meat (usually ground beef), and seasoned with cinnamon, with lemon juice as topping.

== See also ==
- List of cabbage dishes
- List of stuffed dishes
- Stuffed leaves
