= Holishkes =

Traditional Jewish cabbage roll dish

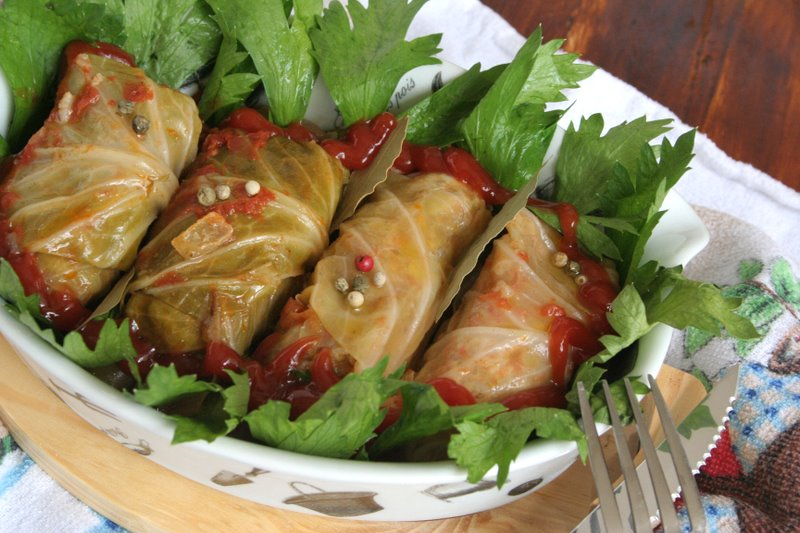
Holishkes in tomato sauce

Holishkes (also holipches or golubtsi or голубцы or huluptzes or prokes or gefilte kroit) is cabbage roll dish in Eastern European Jewish cuisine. Holishkes are prepared from blanched cabbage leaves wrapped in a parcel-like manner around minced meat and then simmered in tomato sauce. Sometimes rice is added to the meat filling. While the dish is eaten all year round, it is customarily served on Sukkot to symbolize a bountiful harvest, and on Simchat Torah because two stuffed cabbage rolls placed side by side resemble Torah scrolls.

== History ==
Holishkes were believed to have first been created by ethnic Ashkenazi Jews in the Russian Empire Poland. These Jews descended from ancient Jews from the Middle East who sought refuge in Central & Eastern Europe due to the aftermath of the Jewish-Roman Wars. Over time, Ashkenazi Jews adapted holishkes from their Turko-Persian and Crimean Tatar neighbors, who prepared similar dishes that were thought to have derived from the Middle Eastern dolma. Eastern Europeans called it gołąbki (little doves), because the rolled cabbage in sauce resembled a bird in a nest. The spicing varies by community. Hungarian Jews use a dash of marjoram; Syrian Jews add cinnamon; Persian Jews add dill and mint. As meat was expensive, rice was added to extend the meat.

== See also ==
- Gołąbki
- Jewish cuisine
- List of cabbage dishes
- Cabbage rolls - the type of such dishes in general
- Vine leaf roll - a similar type of food
