= Gołąbki =

Central European dish

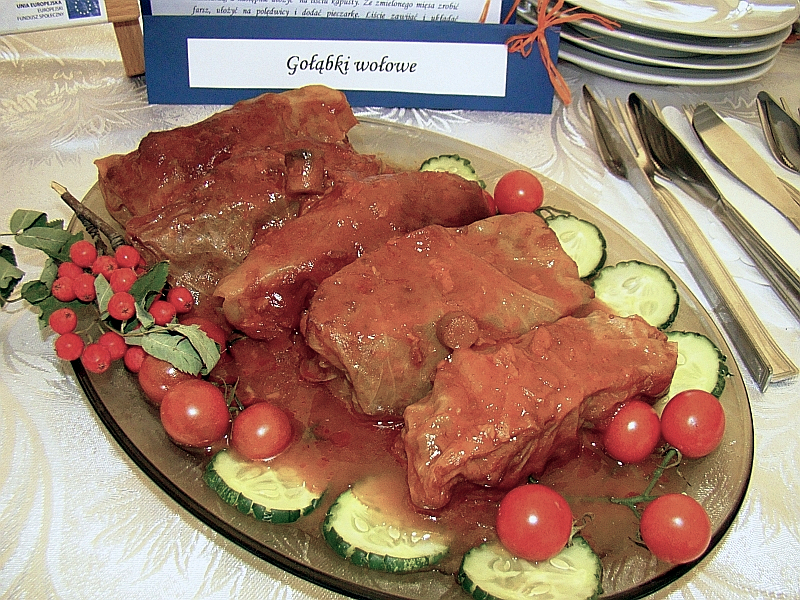
- Gołąbki served with tomato sauce and vegetables
- Alternative names: (Belarus) галубцы, hałubcy (Russia) голубцы, golubtsy (Ukraine) голубці, holubtsi (Lithuania) balandėliai (Czech Republic) (Slovakia) holubky
- Course: Appetizer or main
- Place of origin: Poland
- Region or state: Central and Eastern Europe
- Serving temperature: Hot or cold
- Main ingredients: Cabbage; pork or beef
- Ingredients generally used: onions; rice, kasha or potatoes; bolete mushrooms (optional)

Gołąbki (Polish pronunciation: [ɡɔˈwɔmpki]) is the Polish name of a dish popular in cuisines of Central and Eastern Europe, made from boiled cabbage leaves wrapped around a filling of minced pork or beef, chopped onions, and rice or other carbohydrates such as kasha groats or potatoes.

Gołąbki are often served during festive occasions such as weddings, holidays such as Christmas Day, and other family events.

They can also be prepared using a number of various fillings instead of meat or rice, including mashed potatoes, boiled eggs, barley groats and others. Similar dishes exist in Southern Europe and along the Mediterranean coast, where the cabbage leaves may sometimes be substituted with vine leaves or fermented instead of fresh cabbage leaves.

== Etymology ==
Gołąbki is the plural form of gołąbek, the diminutive form of gołąb ("pigeon, dove"). Max Vasmer accepts this as the origin of the word, stating that the dish was so named due to similarity in shape. The Polish linguist Marek Stachowski finds this theory semantically dubious. He instead proposes an Oriental borrowing, pointing out that a similar dish, aside from Eastern Europe, is known in the Levant and Central Asia. He mentions Persian کلم kalam "cabbage" or کلم پیچ kalam pič "cabbage roll" and Old Armenian կաղամբ kałamb "cabbage" as possible sources. The word would have later been altered by folk etymology to resemble the word for the bird.

== Other names ==
Gołąbki are also referred to in English as golombki, golumpki, golabki, golumpkies, golumpkis, gluntkes, or gwumpki. Similar variations are called holubky (Czech, Slovak), holubtsi (Ukrainian), golubtsy (Russian), balandėliai (Lithuanian), Kohlrouladen (German) or kåldolmar (Sweden, from the Turkish dolma). The dishes sarmale (Romanian) and töltött káposzta (Hungarian) are also very similar, though may use whole fermented cabbage leaves in place of fresh. In Yiddish, holipshes, goleptzi golumpki and holishkes or holep are also very similar dishes.

In the United States, the terms are commonly Anglicized by second- or third-generation Americans to "stuffed cabbage", "stuffed cabbage leaves", or "cabbage casserole". They are affectionately known as "Hunky hand grenades" among diaspora in the Pittsburgh area. They are also referred to as "pigs in a blanket", not to be confused with pigs in blankets in British and Irish cuisine.

== See also ==
- List of cabbage dishes
