= Bayrisch Kraut =

Bavarian cabbage dish

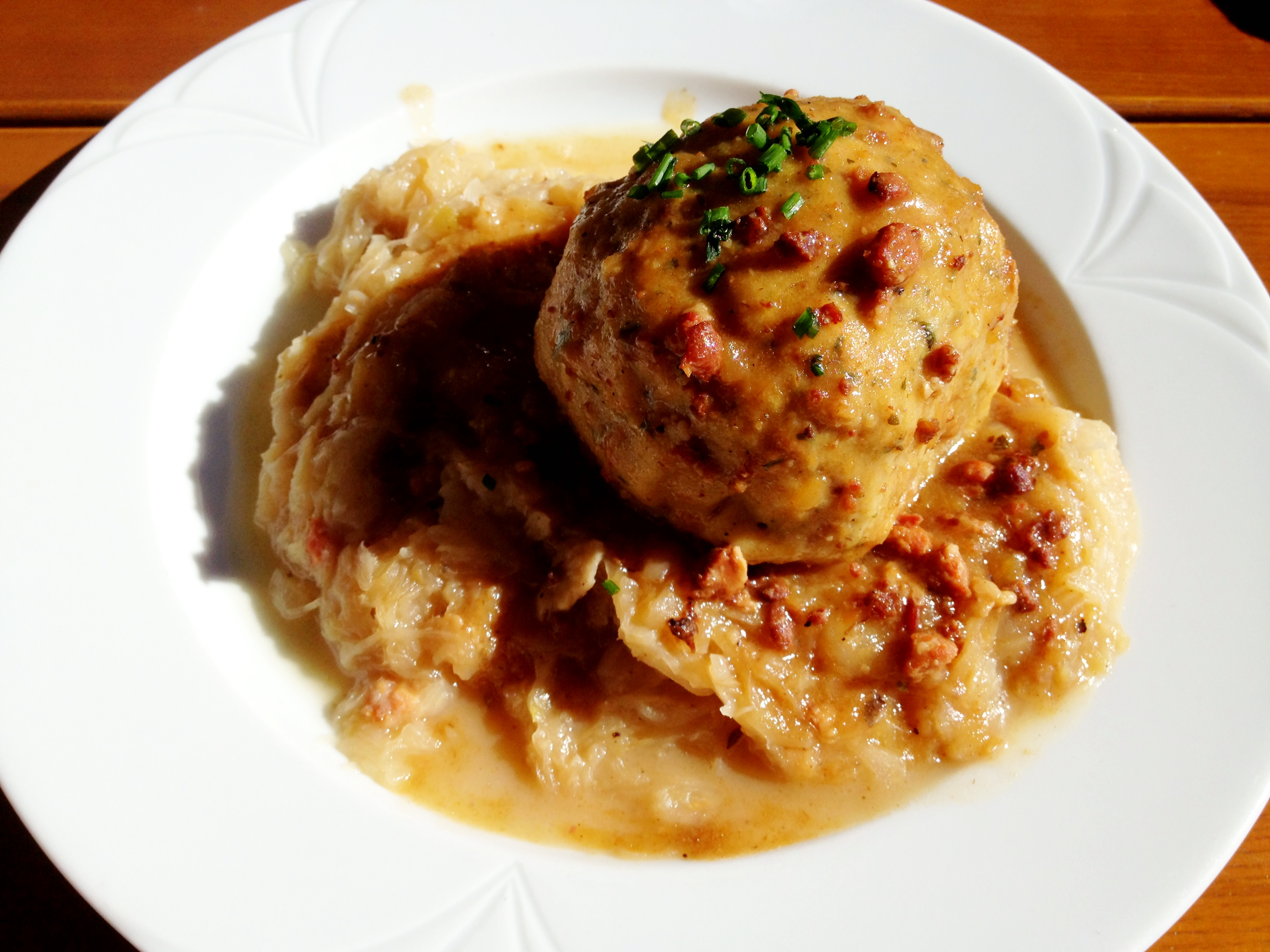
Bacon dumpling with Bayrisch Kraut

Bayrisch Kraut (Bavarian cabbage) is a traditional Bavarian dish. It is made of shredded cabbage cooked in beef stock with pork lard, onion, apples, and seasoned with salt, black pepper, caraway, sugar and vinegar. It is typically served with bratwurst or roast pork. In German cuisine it is an alternative to sauerkraut.

== See also ==
- Bavarian cuisine
- Brenntar
