= Kapusta (disambiguation) =

Kapusta, literally meaning "cabbage" in several Slavic languages, may refer to:

- Kapusta kiszona duszona, a Polish dish
- NATO reporting name for Soviet communications ship SSV-33
- Kapusta class command ship
- Kapusta (surname)

== See also ==
- Kapustka
- Kapust
- Kapuska
