= Potée Lorraine =

A potée is a savoury dish cooked in an earthenware pot. Potées are found all around France, but among the best-known is the potée Lorraine, a speciality of Lorraine, in north-eastern France. Its main ingredient is pork or ham, slowly cooked in water with haricot beans and seasonal vegetables. The cooking liquid may be served as a soup, followed by the meat and vegetables as the main course.

== Description ==
Potées, like other one-pot stews, are familiar throughout France and in many other countries. In France they may have alternative names such as hochepot, garbure and oille. The potée Lorraine differs from many well-known one-pot stews in using pork or ham rather than beef as its main meat. It is among the best-known such French dishes.

Salted pork (porc salée) is widely available in France but some recipes for potée Lorraine use ham hock (jambonneau salé) instead. The meat is thoroughly desalted before being slowly simmered in water in an oven with haricot or other white beans together with vegetables. Anne Willan comments that the dish "has the particular charm of using almost all the available garden vegetables". Various recipes call for a permutation of: broad beans, cabbage, carrots, celery, green beans, leeks, mange-tout, onions, peas, potatoes and turnips. A large sausage (or several small sausages) is usually added towards the end of cooking.

In many cases the broth from the cooking pot is served as a soup before the meat and vegetables are eaten as the main course. The stew is usually served with hot Dijon mustard; cold leftovers may be served with vinaigrette.

== Sources ==
- Curnonsky (1959). Recettes des provinces de France (in French). Paris: Les productions de Paris. OCLC 1153529366.
- David, Elizabeth (1962). French Provincial Cooking. New York: Harper & Row. OCLC 1598335.
- Floyd, Keith (1987). Floyd on France. London: BBC Books. ISBN 0563205199.
- Husson, René (2005). Recettes en Lorraine (in French). Saint-Affrique: Fleurines. OCLC 1245757405.
- Maubourguet, Patrice, ed. (1997). Larousse Gastronomique (in French). Paris: Larousse. ISBN 2-03-507300-6.
- Pomiane, Édouard de (2002). Guide pratique de cuisine familiale (in French). Acton Vale: Belenos. ISBN 9782980691126.
- Willan, Anne (1981). French Regional Cooking. London: Hutchinson. ISBN 009146210X.
