= Pottage =

Soupy stew prepared in a pot

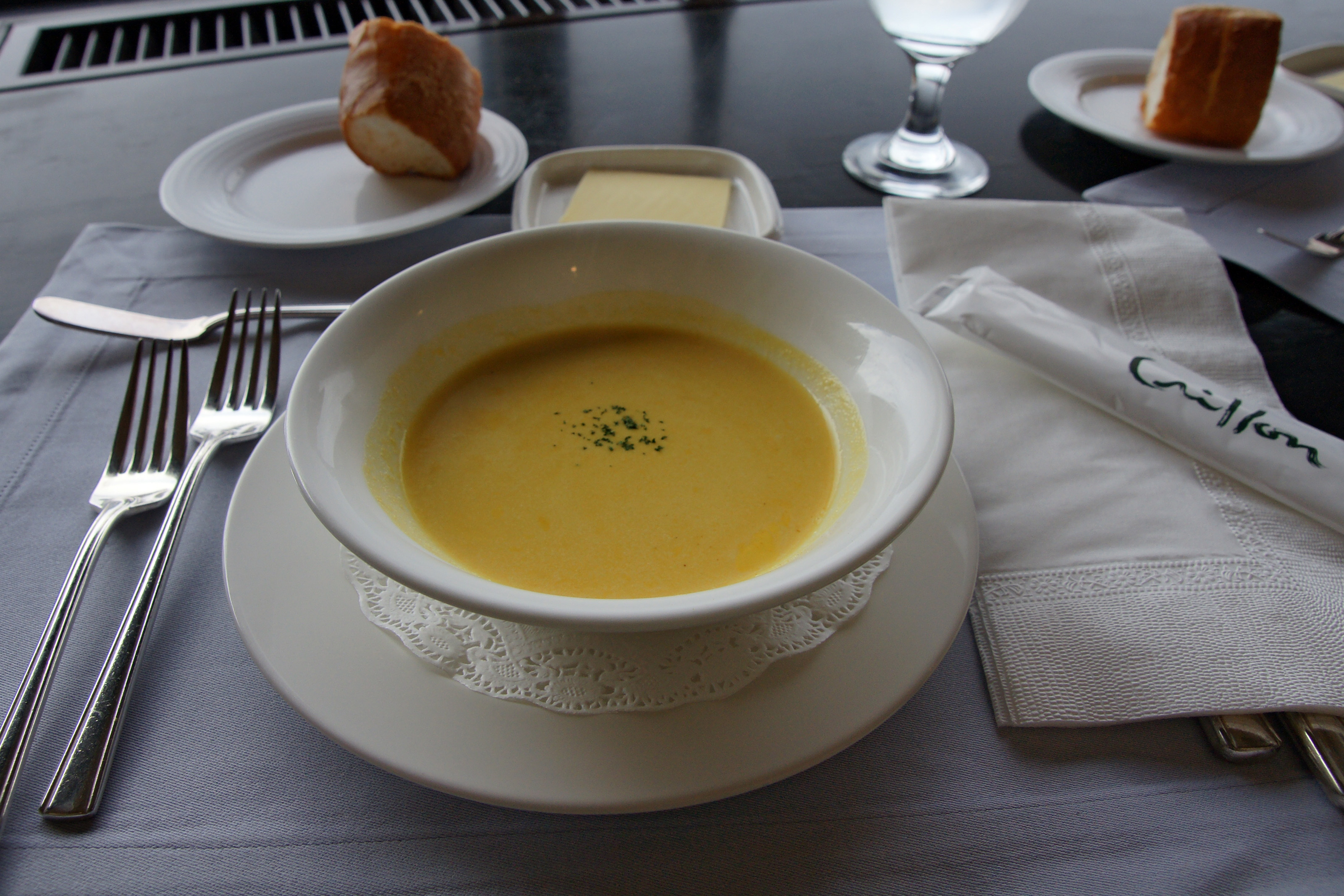
- A pumpkin potage soup.
- Type: Soup, stew, or porridge
- Main ingredients: Vegetables, grains, meat or fish

Pottage or potage (/pɒˈ-, pəˈ-/, French: [potaʒ]; from Old French pottage 'food cooked in a pot') is a thick soup or stew made by boiling vegetables, grains, and, if available, meat or fish. (Note: "potage" Trésor de la langue française informatisé; "potage". Lexico UK English Dictionary. Oxford University Press. Archived from the original on April 16, 2021.; "pottage". Lexico UK English Dictionary UK English Dictionary. Oxford University Press. Archived from the original on April 15, 2021.) It was a staple food for many centuries. The word pottage comes from the same Old French root as potage, which is a dish of more recent origin.

Pottage ordinarily consisted of various ingredients, sometimes those easily available to peasants. It could be kept over the fire for a period of days, during which time some of it could be eaten, and more ingredients added. The result was a dish that was constantly changing. Pottage consistently remained a staple of poor people's diet throughout most of 9th to 17th-century Europe. The pottage that these people ate was much like modern-day soups. When wealthier people ate pottage, they would add more expensive ingredients such as meats.

== Preparation ==
Pottage was typically boiled for several hours until the mixture became homogeneous. It was often served, when possible, with bread.

== Biblical references ==
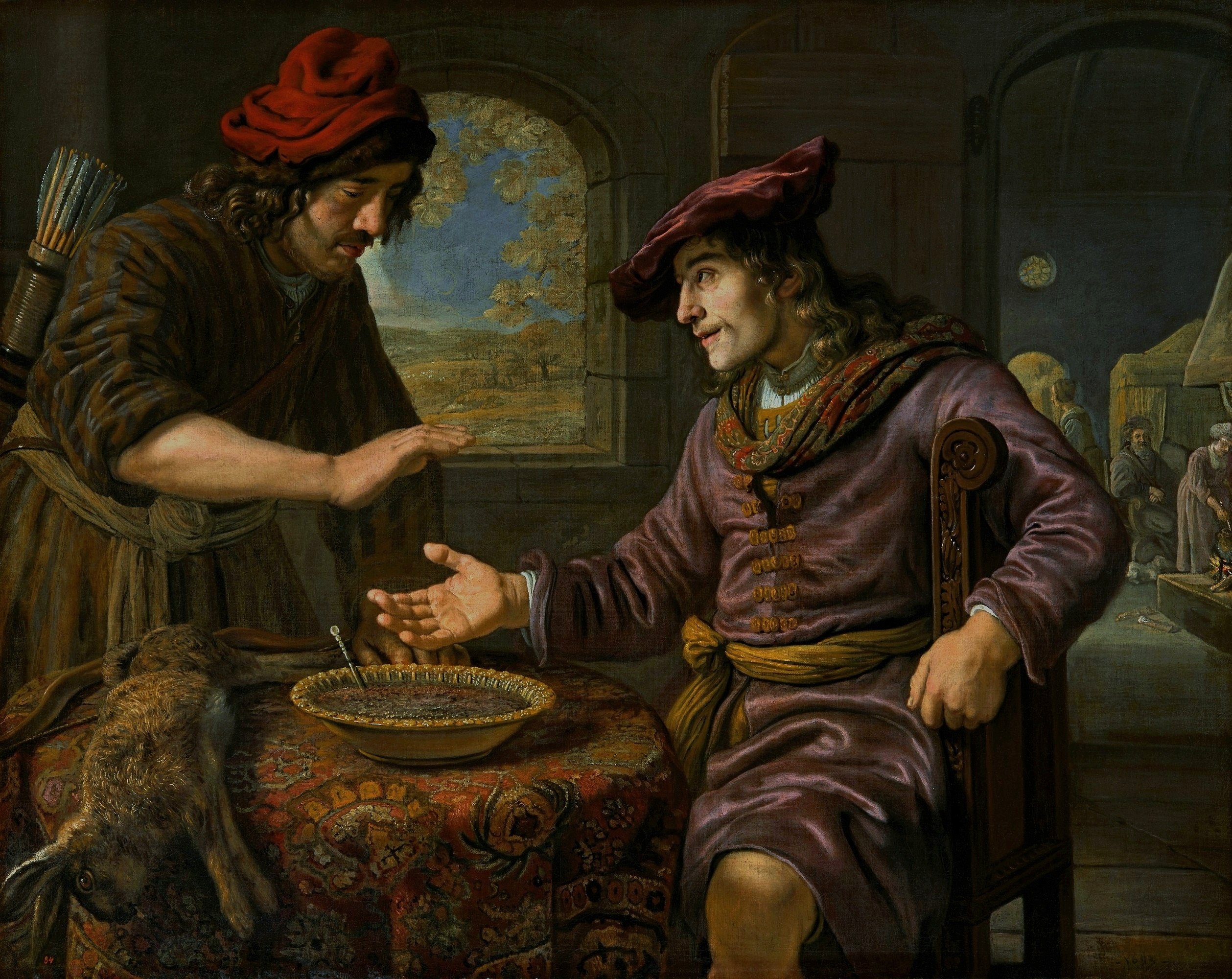
Esau and the mess of pottage (Jan Victors, 1653)

In the King James Bible translation of the story of Jacob and Esau in the Book of Genesis, Esau, being famished, sold his birthright (the rights of the eldest son) to his twin brother Jacob in exchange for a meal of "bread and pottage of lentils" (Gen 25:29–34). This incident is the origin of the phrase a "mess of pottage" (which is not in any Biblical text) to mean a bad bargain involving short-term gain and long-term loss.

In the Revised Standard Version Catholic Edition translation of the Bible, the prophet Elisha purifies a pot of poisoned pottage that was set before the sons of the prophets (2 Kings 4:38–41).

== England ==
Pottage was a staple of the medieval English diet. During the Middle Ages it was usually made with grains, legumes, vegetables and occasionally meats. In Middle English, thick pottages (stondyng) made with cereals, kidneys, shredded meat, sometimes thickened with egg yolks and bread crumbs were called by various names like brewet, egerdouce, mortrew, mawmenee, blancmange and blance dessore. Thinner pottages were said to be ronnyng. Frumenty was a pottage made with freshly-cleaned wheat grain that was boiled until it burst, allowed to cool, then boiled with broth and either cow's milk or almond milk, and thickened with egg yolk and flavored with sugar and spices.

The earliest known cookery manuscript in the English language, The Forme of Cury, written by the court chefs of King Richard II, contains several pottage recipes including one made from cabbage, ham, onions and leeks. Google Books and Internet Archive. A slightly later manuscript from the 1430s is called Potage Dyvers ("Various Pottages"). During the Tudor period, a good many English peasants' diets consisted almost solely of pottage and self-cultivated vegetables, such as carrots. An early 17th-century British recipe for pottage was made by boiling mutton and oatmeal with violet leaves, endive, chicory, strawberry leaves, spinach, langdebeefe, marigold flowers, scallions and parsley.

== France ==
Potage was a common dish in the medieval cuisine of northern France, and it increased in popularity from the High Middle Ages onward. The word "potage" as a culinary term appears as early as the mid-13th century, describing a wide variety of boiled and simmered foods. Some potages were very liquid, while others were relatively solid with ingredients like bread, pulses, or rice that fully absorbed the liquid. Other potages resembled ragoûts and other dishes that were recognized as entrées in the 17th century and later. Still others were porrées of vegetables.

=== Early use of the term ===
Among the earliest texts to include recipes for potages is Le Viandier (c. 1300), which includes twenty-seven recipes for various potages. In some manuscripts, the recipes are placed under the heading "potages lyans" (thickened potages). Recipes for potages (or potaiges) also appear in Le Ménagier de Paris (1393) under various headings, including "a espices" or "sans espices" (with or without spices), and "lyans" or "non lyans" (thickened or not); and in the Petit traicté auquel verrez la maniere de faire cuisine (c. 1536), more widely known from a later edition titled Livre fort excellent de cuisine (1542).

In the Petit traicté, in a collection of menus (Note: The word "menus" appropriately describes this section of the Petit traicté, but the first appearance of "menu" with that culinary meaning is in the much later Nouveau Dictionnaire de l’Académie françoise, 1718, p. II:50.) at the end of the book, potages compose one of the four stages of the meal. The first stage is the entree de table (entrance to the table); the second stage consists of potaiges (foods boiled or simmered "in pots"); the third consists of one or more services de rost (meat or fowl "roasted" in dry heat); and the last is the issue de table (departure from the table). These four stages of the meal appear consistently in this order in all the books that derive from the Petit traicté.

The terms entree de table and issue de table are organizing phrases, "describing the structure of a meal rather than the food itself". The terms potaiges and rost indicate cooking methods but not ingredients. The menus, though, give some idea of both the ingredients and the cooking methods that were characteristic of each stage of the meal.

The essential element of the potages was broth from meat, fowl, fish, or vegetables. Some potages were simple broths; others included veal, boar, furred game, boiled fowl and game birds of all sorts, and fish; others included only vegetables like leeks, marrows, and lettuce. The many types of potages are similar to those of the menus in the Ménagier de Paris, written 150 years before the Petit traicté.

=== Potage in the "Classical Order" of table service ===
Between the mid-16th and mid-17th century, the stages of the meal underwent several significant changes. Notably, potage became the first stage of the meal and the entrée became the second stage, followed by the roast, entremets, and dessert.

In the 17th, 18th, and 19th centuries, potages on meat days (Note: In accordance with church regulations in force from the Middle Ages to the 19th century, the ingredients for every stage of the meal varied between "meat days" (jours gras, literally "fat days"), when all foods were allowed, and "lean days" (jours maigres), when the church forbade consumption of meat and fowl but not fish. Until the 16th century, white meats (milk, cream, butter, and cheese) and eggs were additionally forbidden in Lent. Beginning in the 17th century, white meats were allowed in Lent. Beginning in the 19th century, eggs were also allowed in Lent. (Flandrin 2007, pp. 32–33)) were broths made from all sorts of butcher’s meat, fowl, and feathered game, but not furred game. Additions to the broth included the meat or fowl used to make the broth, organ meats, vegetables, and bread or pasta. Common types of potages included bouillon (clear broth from poached meat or fowl), soupe (bouillon mixed with finely grated bread), oilles (potages of root vegetables and varied meats), and bisques (potages of the finest delicacies—not the smooth, creamy bisques of modern cuisine).

On lean days, fish replaced meat and fowl in every stage of the meal. Meat and fowl broths were replaced by fish broth, vegetable purées, milk or almond milk, and juices of various vegetables like asparagus, artichokes, and mushrooms. Animal fats were replaced with butter or oil. Additions to the broth included a wide variety of fish, shellfish, crustaceans, turtles, frogs, and even scoters (a seaduck, not a fish).

Vegetable potages were also common on lean days, many made of vegetables that appeared almost exclusively on lean days, such as cabbage, lettuce, onions, leeks, carrots, lentils, pumpkin, turnips, and white and black salsify. Other vegetables in potages on lean days were of a finer quality of the sort served as entremets or Lenten entrées, including cauliflower, spinach, artichokes, cardoons, chard, celery, Paris mushrooms (cultivated mushrooms), and skirrets. Out of Lent, potages on lean days sometimes also included eggs.

== Colonial New England ==
Native American cuisine also had a similar dish, but it was made with maize rather than the traditional European grain varieties. Indian succotash, sometimes called pondomenast or Indian pottage, was made with boiled corn and, when available, meat such as venison, bear, moose, otter, raccoon, or beaver. Fish such as shad, eel, or herring could be used in place of the meat. Kidney beans were sometimes mixed into Indian pottage, along with vegetables such as Jerusalem artichoke, pumpkin, and squash. Ground nuts such as acorns, chestnuts, or walnuts were used to thicken the pottage.

In the cuisine of New England, pottage began as "bean porridge" vegetables, seasonings and meat, fowl or fish. This simple staple of early American cuisine eventually evolved into the chowders and baked beans typical of New England's cuisine. A version of "scotch barley broth" is attested to in the 18th century colonial recipe collection called Mrs Gardiner's Family Receipts. Pottages were probably served at the First Thanksgiving.

== Spanish cuisine ==
According to Spanish cuisine religious customs, if a festa doble (a "double feast" in the church) fell on a meat day two consecutive potaje courses were served, one of which would be a cheese-topped rice or noodle dish, the other a meat stew (Catalan: guisat) cooked in "salsa" made from wine, vinegar, parsley, spleen, liver, saffron, egg yolks and assorted spices. Two potaje courses were also served for fish days, first high-quality spinach from the monastery gardens topped with peppers, or cabbage or lettuce (if spinach could not be found), followed by either a bowl of semolina, noodles or rice cooked in almond milk, or a grain bowl of semolina groats seasoned with cinnamon.

== Nigeria ==
In Nigeria, yam pottage is eaten with vegetables and fish or meat.

== Wales ==
This is similar to the Welsh cawl, which is a broth, soup or stew often cooked on and off for days at a time over the fire in a traditional inglenook, containing ingredients such as potatoes and leek.

== See also ==
- Brown Windsor soup
- Casserole
- Cawl
- Frumenty
- Lancashire hotpot
- Lentil soup
- List of soups
- List of stews
- Medieval cuisine
- Pease pudding
- Potted meat
- Sop

== Notes, references, and sources ==
=== Sources ===
- Albala, Ken; Tomasik, Timothy, eds. (2014). The Most Excellent Book of Cookery, Livre fort excellent de cuysine. Totnes, Devon: Prospect Books. ISBN 978-1903018965.
- Brereton, Georgine E.; Ferrier, Janet M., eds. (1981). Le Menagier de Paris. Oxford: Clarendon Press. ISBN 0198157487.
- Chiquart (2010). Scully, Terence (ed.). Du fait de cuisine / On Cookery of Master Chiquart (1420). Tempe, Arizona: Arizona Center for Medieval and Renaissance Studies (ACMRS). ISBN 978-0866984027.
- Flandrin, Jean-Louis (1983). "Brouets, potages et bouillons". Médiévales. 5 (Nourritures): 5–14. doi:10.3406/medi.1983.932.
- Flandrin, Jean-Louis (2007) [2001]. Arranging the Meal: A History of Table Service in France [L’Ordre des mets]. Translated by Johnson, Julie E. Berkeley: University of California Press. ISBN 978-0520238855.
- Goodman, Ruth (2016). How To Be A Tudor: A Dawn-to-Dusk Guide to Everyday Life. Penguin Books. ISBN 9780241973714.
- Le Grand Vocabulaire François, 30 vols. Paris: C. Panckoucke. 1774.
- Hyman, Philip; Hyman, Mary (1992). "Les livres de cuisine et le commerce des recettes en France aux 15e et 16e siècles". In Carole Lambert (ed.). Du manuscrit à la table. Paris, Montréal: Champion-Slatkin—Les Presses de l'Université de Montréal. ISBN 978-2852037076.
- Jurafsky, Dan (2014). The Language of Food. New York and London: W.W. Norton & Company. ISBN 978-0393240832.
- Scully, Terence, ed. (1988). The Viandier of Taillevent. Ottawa: University of Ottawa Press. ISBN 978-0776601748.
- Smith, Edward (1873). Foods. D. Appleton.
- Smith, H. (1950). The Master Book of Soups Featuring 1001 Titles and Recipes. London: Spring Books.
- Stavely, Keith W. F.; Fitzgerald, Kathleen (2011). Northern Hospitality: Cooking by the Book in New England. University of Massachusetts Press. ISBN 978-1-55849-861-7.
- Tomasik, Timothy J. (May 2016). "Cuisine by the Cut of One's Trousers: Cookbook Marketing in Early Modern France". Food and History. 14 (2–3): 223–247. doi:10.1484/J.FOOD.5.115341. ISSN 1780-3187.
