= List of French soups and stews =

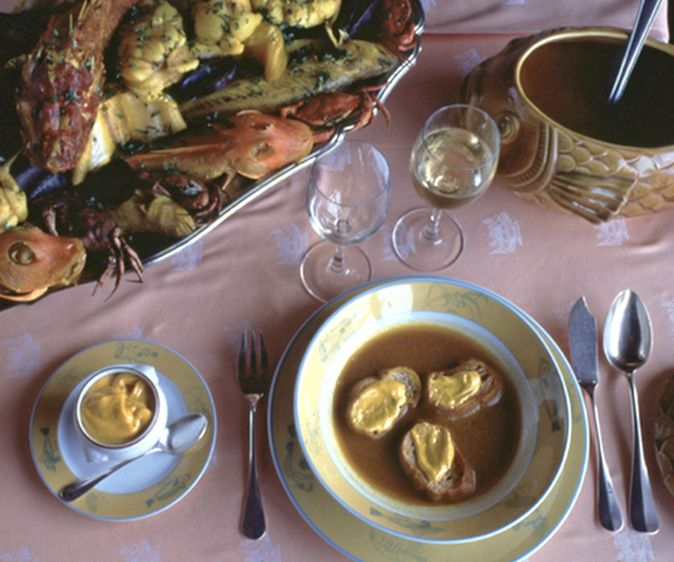
A traditional bouillabaisse from Marseille, France, with the fish served separately after the soup

This is a list of French soups and stews. French cuisine consists of cooking traditions and practices from France, famous for rich tastes and subtle nuances with a long and rich history.

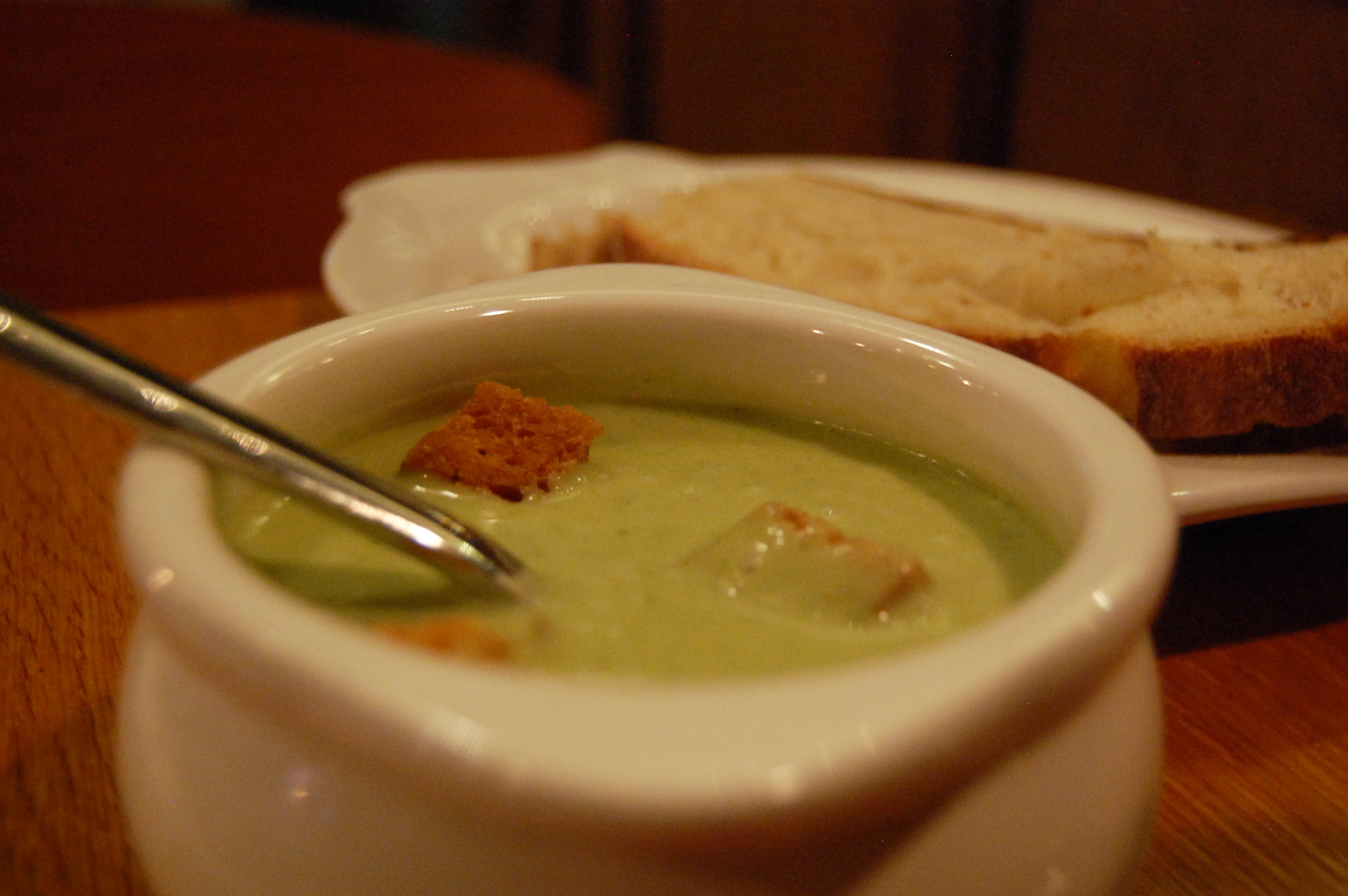
Butter lettuce soup with croutons

== French soups and stews ==
- Bisque
- Boeuf bourguignon - is a traditional French casserole, with marinated meat, button mushrooms, small whole onions and French herbs in wine.
- Bouillabaisse – a stew of mixed herbs, fish, and vegetables.
- Consommé
- French onion soup
- Garbure – a thick French soup or stew of meat and root vegetables.
- Lettuce soup
- Oille – a French potée or soup believed to be the forerunner of pot-au-feu composed of various meats and vegetables.
- Oxtail – there are numerous Oxtail stews in French cuisine
- Potée
- Ragout
  - Ragout fin – its origin in France is not confirmed but the dish is also known in Germany as Würzfleisch, although use of the French name is more common nowadays.
- Ratatouille – a vegetable stew with olive oil, aubergine, courgette, bell pepper, tomato, onion and garlic
- Tourin – a type of French garlic soup
- Velouté - a soup or sauce made of chicken, veal, or fish stock and cream and thickened with butter and flour
- Vichyssoise – chilled leek and potato soup with cream
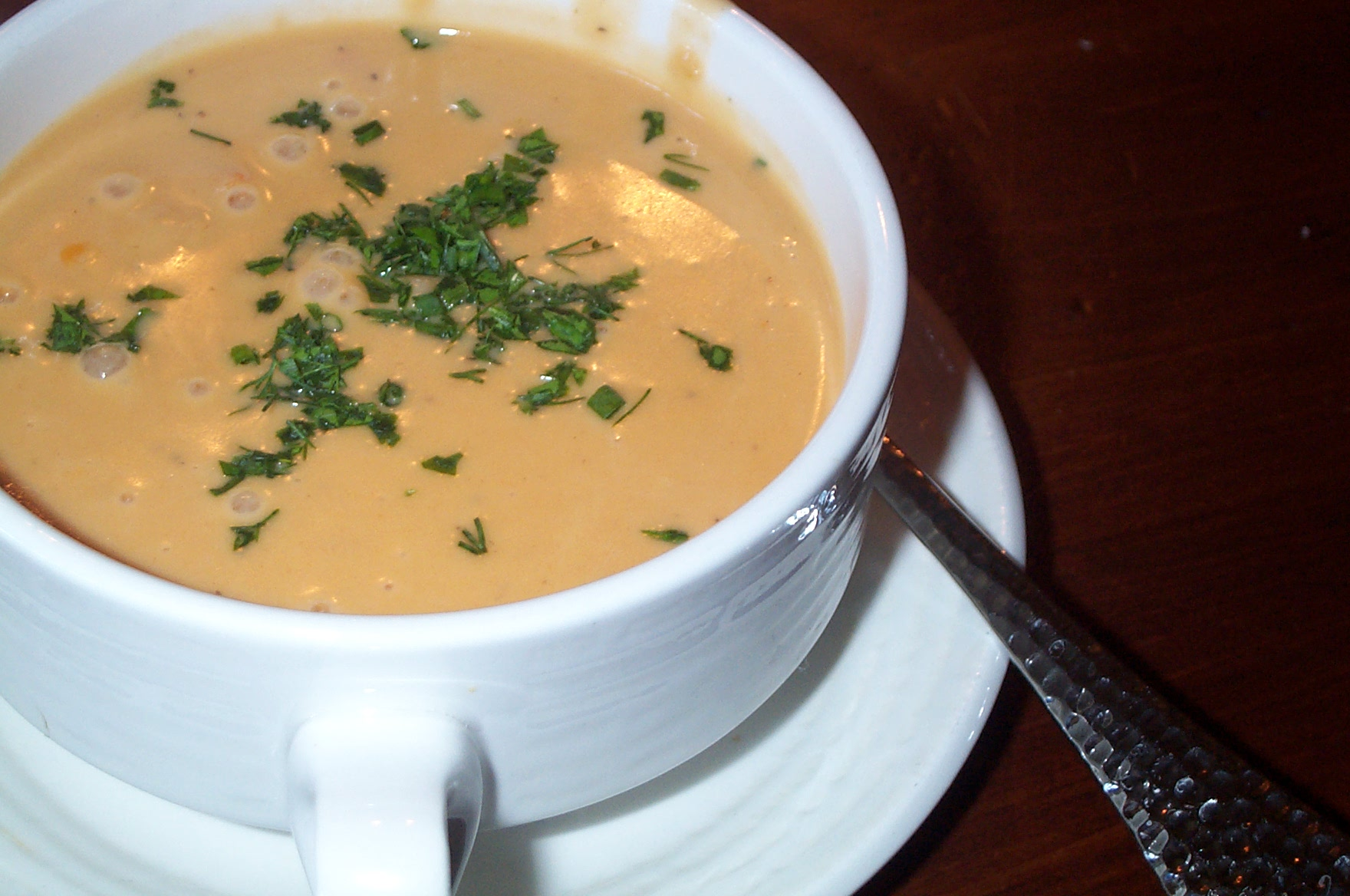
Lobster bisque

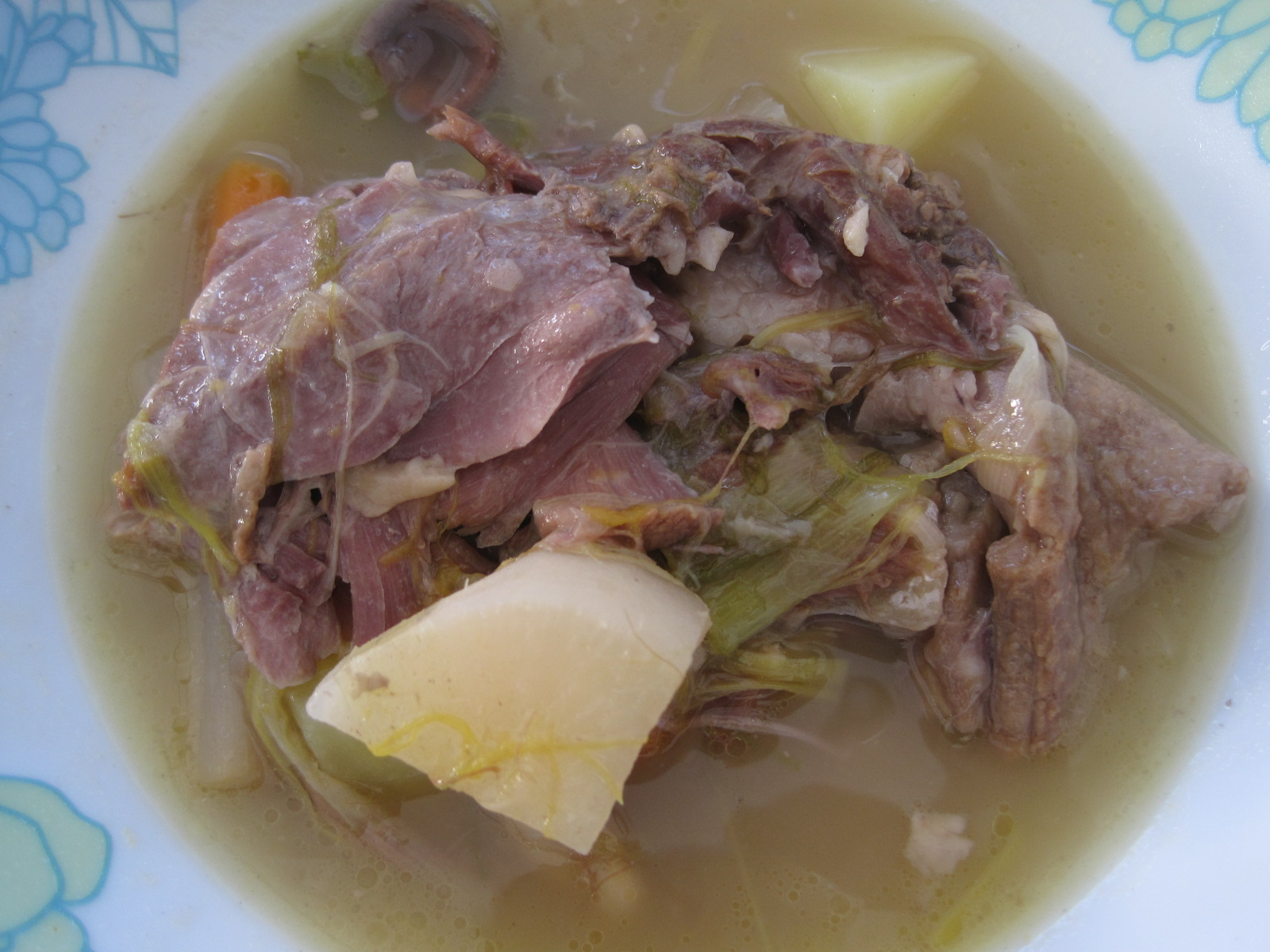
Garbure

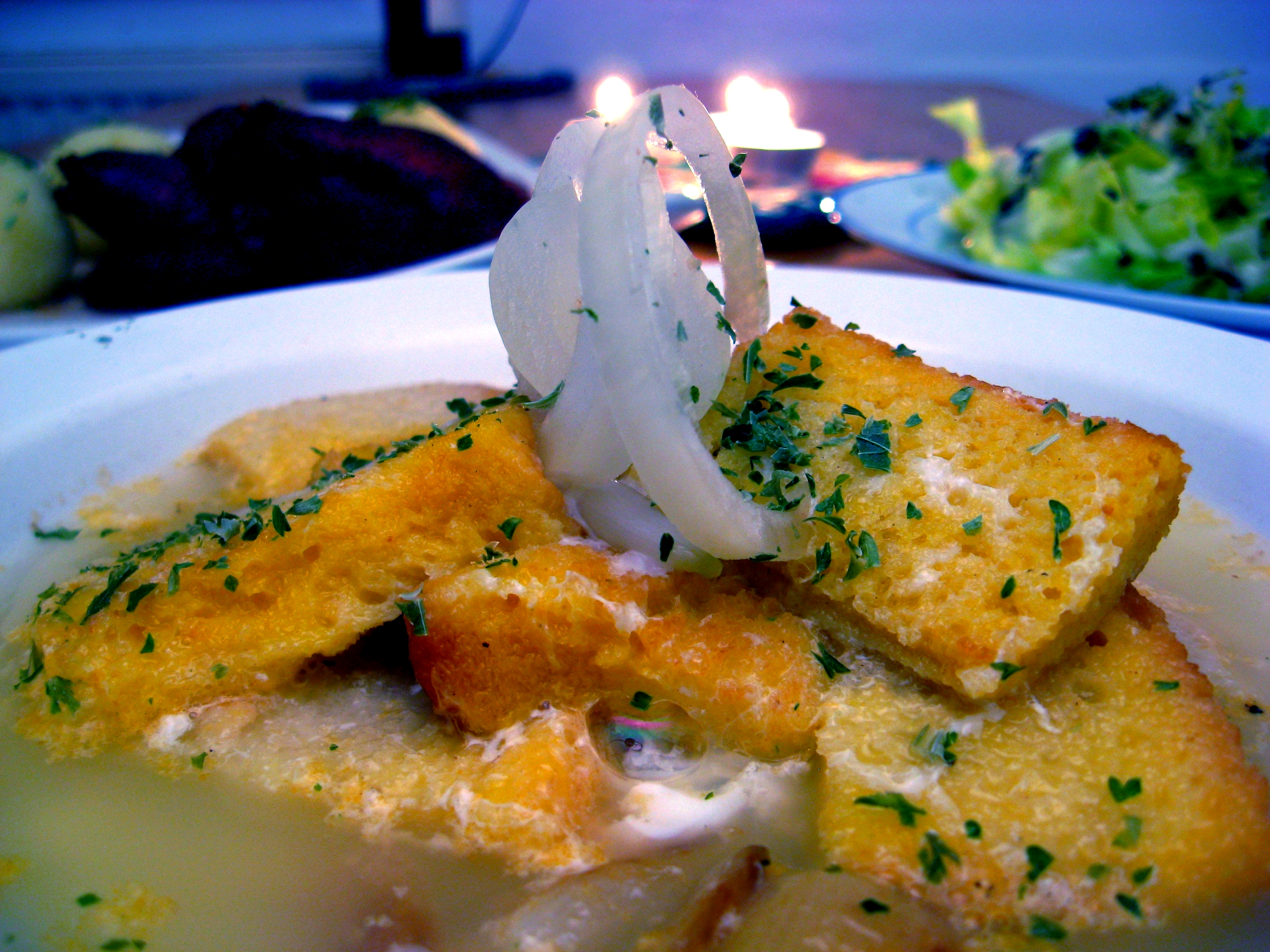
Tourin

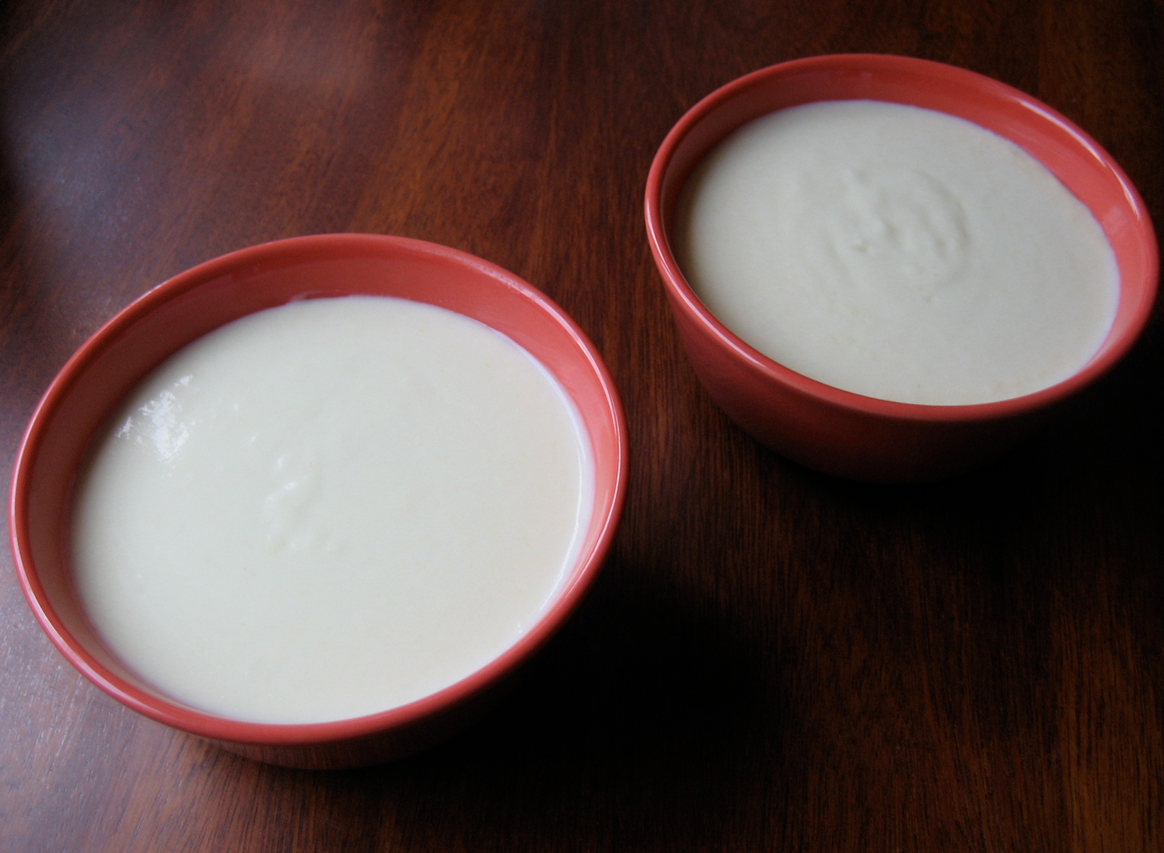
Vichyssoise

== See also ==
- List of soups
- List of stews
