= Regional cuisines of medieval Europe =

There are more or less distinct areas in medieval Europe where certain predominant foodstuffs may be discerned. In the British Isles, northern France, the Low Countries, the northern German-speaking areas, Scandinavia and the Baltic the climate was generally too harsh for the cultivation of grapes and olives. In the south, wine was the common drink for both rich and poor alike (though the commoner usually had to settle for cheap second pressing wine) while beer was the commoner's drink in the north and wine an expensive import. Citrus fruits (though not the kinds most common today) and pomegranates were common around the Mediterranean. Dried figs and dates occurred quite frequently in the north, but were used rather sparingly in cooking.

Olive oil was among the ubiquitous ingredients around the Mediterranean, but remained an expensive import in the north where oil of poppy, walnut, hazel and filbert was the most affordable alternative. Butter and lard, especially after the Black Death, was used in considerable quantities in the northern and northwestern regions, especially in the Low Countries. Almost universal in middle and upper class cooking all over Europe was the almond, which was in the ubiquitous and highly versatile almond milk, which was used as a substitute in dishes that otherwise required eggs or milk, though the bitter variety came along much later.

== Central Europe ==
=== German-speaking territories ===
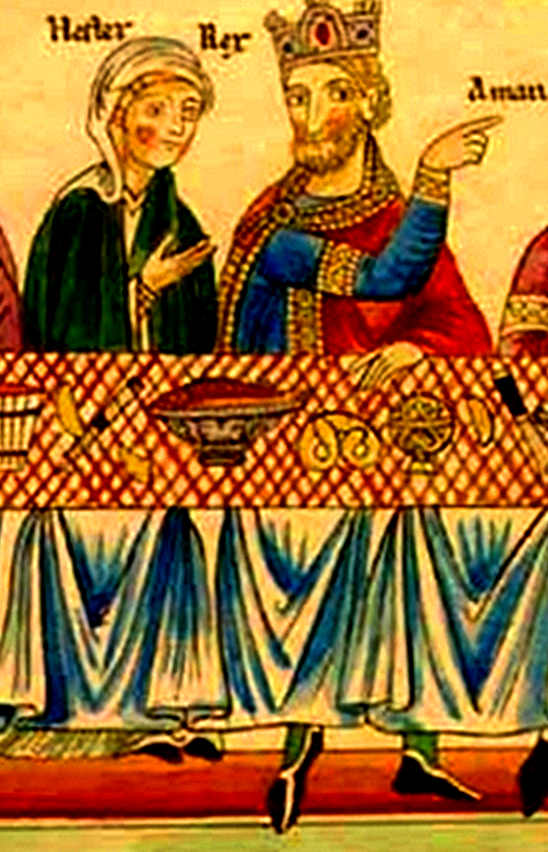
Queen Esther and King Ahasuerus depicted dining on, among other things, a fish dish and a pretzel; illustration from Hortus deliciarum, Alsace, late 12th century.

Though various forms of dishes consisting of batter or dough cooked in fat, like crêpes, fritters and doughnuts were common in most of Europe, they were especially popular among Germans and known as krapfen (Old High German: "claw, hook") and were quite similar to the deep-fried dough pastries of today. The extensive use of lard and butter for cooking and a diet that was perceived as especially fatty gained Germans a reputation as being the "fat Germans". The fasting regulations of the Catholic Church posed particular problems to the German population. Olives could not be cultivated and olive oil was an expensive import. Oils made from various nuts were available, but in relatively short supply. By far, the most common sources of fat were butter and, above all, lard. The price of fish was generally higher, and while it was unaffordable to most people for most of the time, the need to use fish for fasting days could mean considerable increases in expenses for the wealthier households. Mustard was used in other parts of Europe long before the Middle Ages, but seemed to be especially common in Germany. A 14th-century travel account by Eustache Deschamps, a French poet, shows his considerable discontent with the German custom of smearing generous amounts of mustard on just about every type of meat.

It was rare that recipes for use in dire situations were included in recipe collections, but one example from a cookbook in Low German has been preserved. It gives instructions for a wartime stew consisting of any available greens and vegetables to be boiled in animal stomachs or intestines, an effective method in situations where no proper kitchenware would be available. In the First Margrave War, the city of Nuremberg was able to feed its citizens properly and still emerge victorious through careful planning, extensive stockpiling of grain and meat and strict control of prices by the town council.

=== Poland ===
The most common grains in Poland were millet (often made into kasza, a type of porridge) and wheat. Barley and oats were cultivated, but used mostly as animal feed or for brewing beer. Cabbage (especially as sauerkraut), kale, peas, broad beans, and onions were the most common vegetables. Dill and mustard were almost ubiquitous potherbs and parsley was used as a leafy green in stews, as a flavor additive, and applied as a coloring agent in dishes for the upper classes. Beef, pork and poultry (primarily chicken) were the most common meats, with the occasional appearance of mutton and lamb. Game, as elsewhere, was highly prized, but in short supply and usually limited to the high nobility, as hunting licenses were controlled by land owners. Fish was a staple, but unlike Germans, Poles tended to eat it only on fast days when meat was forbidden by the church.

Beer was drunk by all social classes, and came in many different varieties and made from millet, wheat, barley, rye or oats sometimes in combination. Wheat beer was the most common. Though often believed to be a common Slavic drink, mead was fairly expensive and primarily enjoyed at weddings and baptismal parties, though always overshadowed by the ever-present beer. It had a high standing as a ceremonial drink and used when arranging alliances and closing contracts. Wine was generally quite expensive and was enjoyed mostly by the nobility. Although there is evidence of a few vineyards in Poland, almost all wine had to be imported.

A large variety of breads, like obwarzanki, were sold by vendors in Kraków as early as the 14th century and placki, flat cakes, came in a surprising number of varieties, including one variety with an apple topping, reminiscent of pizza. German bakers operating in Polish towns had much influence. Krepels (from German Krapfen, "claw; hook") were fried pastries with a cheese filling served with strawberries or other fruit, and resembled a modern empanada.

== Northern Europe ==
=== England ===
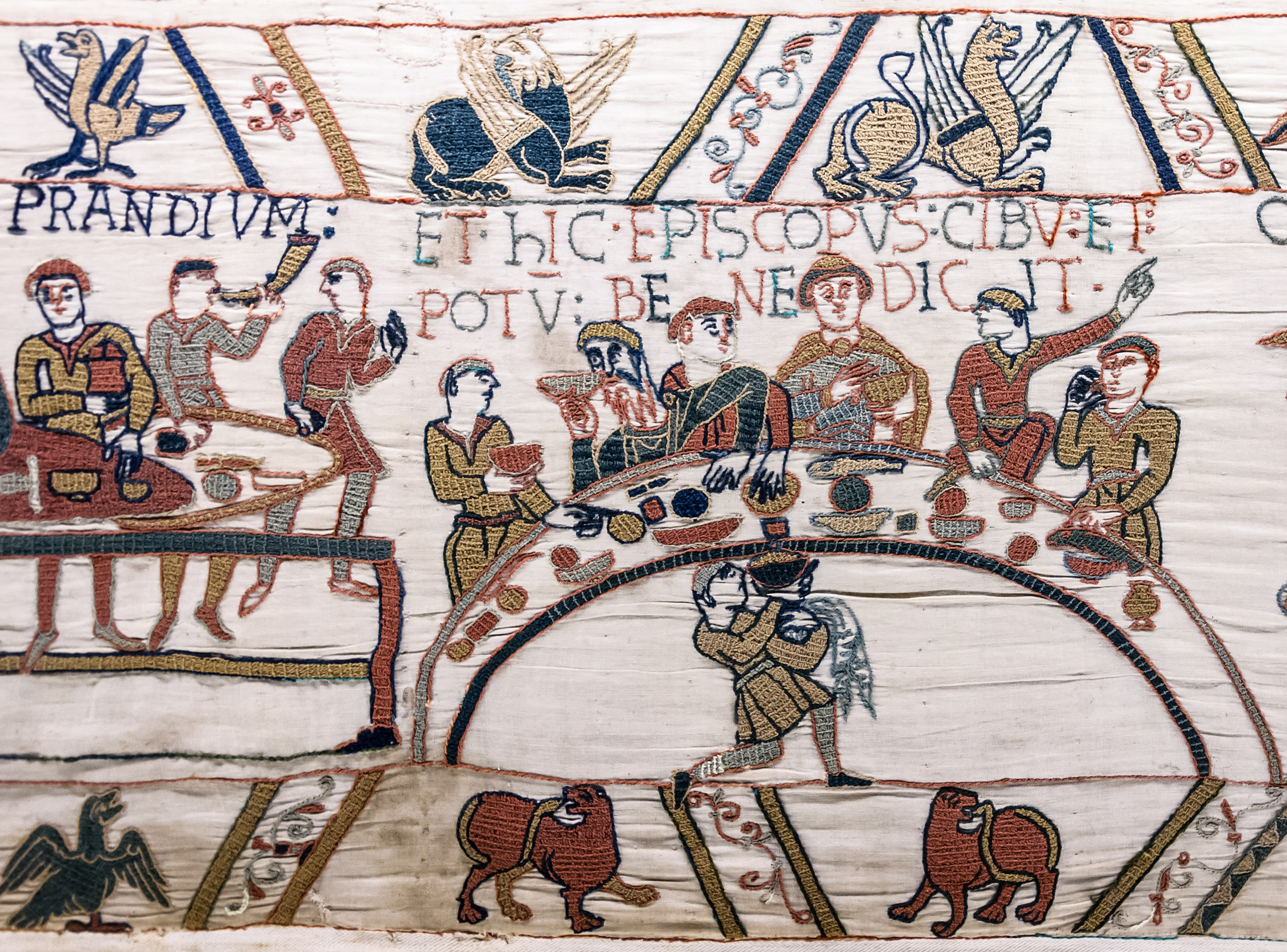
The feast of William the Conqueror, detail from the Bayeux Tapestry, late 11th century.

The food eaten by Anglo-Saxons was long presumed to differ between elites and commoners. However, a 2022 study by the University of Cambridge found that Anglo-Saxon elites and royalty both ate a primarily vegetarian diet based on cereals, as did the peasantry. The discovery came after bioarchaeologist Sam Leggett analysed chemical dietary signatures from the bones of 2,023 people buried in England between the 5th to 11th centuries and cross referenced the analysis with markers of social status. Rather than elites eating regular banquets with huge quantities of meat, the researchers concluded these were occasional grand feasts hosted by the peasants for their rulers rather than regular occurrences. Ale was the drink of choice of both Anglo-Saxon commoners and nobles, and known dishes included various stews, broths, soups and early forms of the crumpet. Bacon was also consumed.

The Norman Conquest brought with it a variety of new foodstuffs to England. It has previously been believed that the Anglo-Norman cuisine was mostly similar to that of France, but recent study has shown that many recipes had unique English traits. This was based partly on the different available foodstuffs on the British Isles, but more due to influence from Arab cuisine through the Norman conquest of Sicily. The Arab invaders in the 9th century had cultivated their lifestyle culturally and economically to such a degree that the Norman invaders inherited and adapted many of their habits, including cooking styles. Norman participation in the crusades also brought them into contact with Middle Eastern and Byzantine cooking. The subtlety (or entremet), the fanciful and highly decorative surprise dish used to separate one course from another, was brought to new levels of complexity and refinement by English chefs. Among the specialties were pommes dorées ("gilded apples"), meatballs of mutton or chicken coloured with saffron or a glaze of egg yolk. The Anglo-Norman variant, pommes d'orange, were flavoured and coloured with the juice of bitter oranges.

=== Scandinavia ===
The climate in the far north of Europe made cultivation of cereals even more difficult, and the wheat so popular in the south was a luxury in northern Europe. Wheat could cost at least twice as much as the most common grains, barley and rye. Barley was the most widely grown, but a great percentage of the harvest went into the extensive beer production, while rye was the principal bread grain. Like in the rest of Europe, oats was considered only fit as animal fodder and was eaten only when no other choice was available, and then usually as porridge or gruel. Though grains were in the highest regard among medieval Scandinavians and were among the most frequently mentioned foods, other vegetable foods were an indispensable part of the diet: peas, turnips, beans, carrots, onions, leeks and various greens and herbs all provided essential nutrients and vitamins. Kale, a form of cabbage, was especially important in Denmark and Sweden and was a valuable source of fresh food in the winter months, since it kept well and could be harvested (and even tasted better) after the first frost had set in.

Fish was of great importance to most of Scandinavia, and particularly so was the herring fishing in the Limfjord and Oresund. The great shoals of herring migrating from the Atlantic into the Baltic to feed were funnelled through certain narrow points and were caught in huge numbers. The amount of fish caught was more than enough to feed the local population and allowed for huge exports of smoked, and especially salted, fish. Great herring markets were organized in southern Scandinavia, most notably at Skanör in Scania, which was in the Middle Ages part of Denmark. From this market alone, merchant vessels of the Hanseatic League, the powerful medieval confederation of northern German cities, exported upwards of over 100,000 barrels of salted herring during many decades of the Late Middle Ages. Of equal, or even greater importance was cod, often fished on the North Sea and Atlantic, dried to make stockfish, and imported as an important staple, particularly during fast and Lent. Many freshwater fish were also of great dietary or economic importance, such as salmon, eel, pike and bream.

Cattle rearing was very widespread in Scandinavia, especially Denmark, where the Black Death had left huge field areas untended and well-suited for grazing. The majority of meat produced was consumed by the local population, but an export market for high-grade beef slowly built up after the 1360s, and had by the 17th century reached well over 100,000 animals per year. All this cattle meant not just meat, but also great quantities of dairy products, which consisted mostly of soured milk drinks, various cheeses and, also a major export product, butter.

== Northern France ==
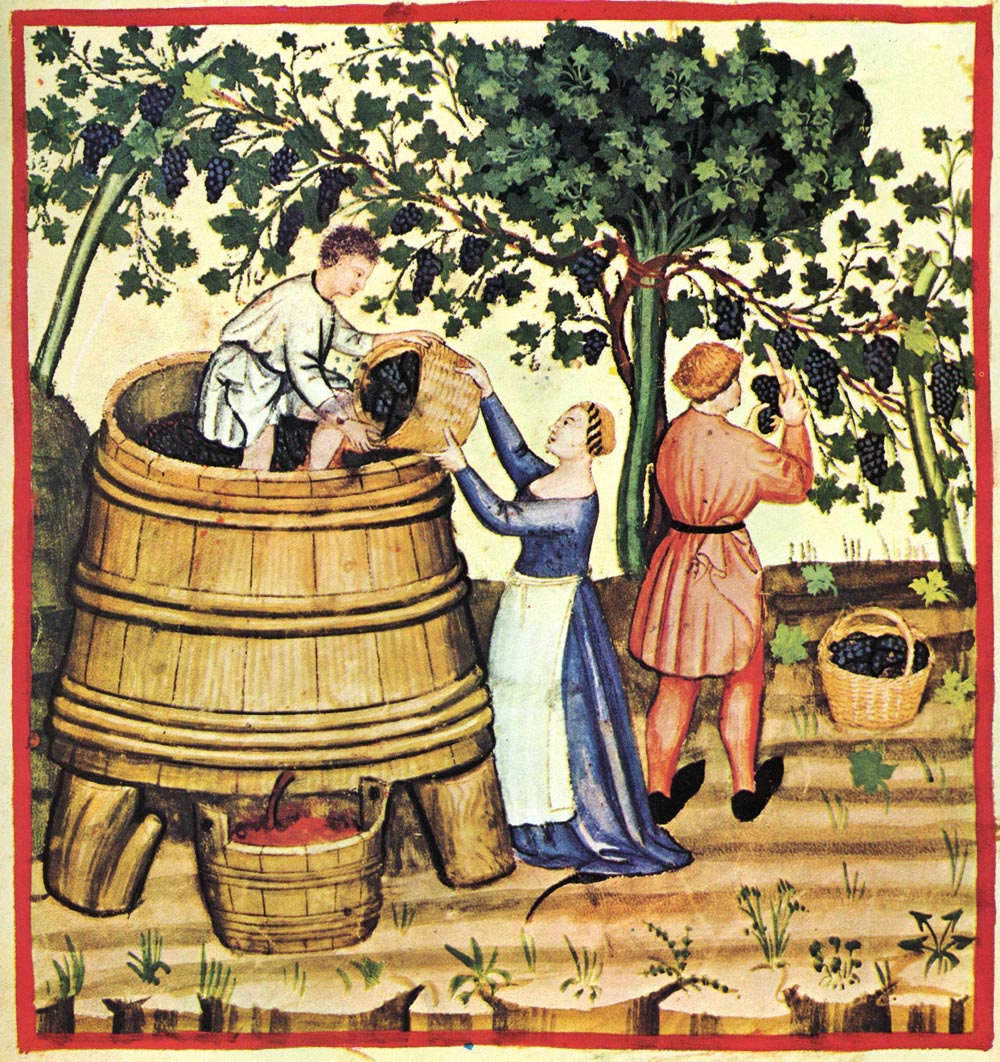
Pressing wine after the harvest; Tacuinum Sanitatis, 14th century.

Northern French cuisine had many similarities to the Anglo-Norman French across the channel, but also had its own specialties. Typical of the Northern French kitchen were the potages and broths, and French chefs excelled in the preparation of meat, fish, roasts, and the sauces that were considered appropriate to each dish. The use of dough and pastry, which was fairly popular in Britain at the time, was almost completely absent from recipe collections with the exception of a few pies. Nor were there any forms of dumplings or the fritters that were so popular in Central Europe. A common Northern French habit was to name dishes after famous and often exotic places and people.

A specialty among finer French chefs was the preparation of so-called parti-colored dishes. These mimicked the late medieval fashion of wearing clothing with two colors contrasting one another on either side of the garment, a fashion that survived in the costumes of court jesters. The common Western European "white dish" (blanc manger) had a northern French variant where one side was colored bright red or blue. Another recipe in Du fait de cuisine from 1420 described an entremet consisting of a roasted boar's head with one half colored green and the other golden yellow.

== Western Mediterranean ==
Roman influence on the entire Mediterranean region was so considerable that to this day, the basic food in most of the region is still wheat bread, olives, olive oil, wine, cheese, and the occasional piece of meat or fish. The territories from the Atlantic to the Italian Peninsula, and especially the Catalan and Occitan-speaking areas were closely interrelated culturally and politically. The Muslim conquest of Sicily and southern Spain was highly influential on the cuisine by introducing new plants like lemons, pomegranates, eggplants and spices such as saffron. The coloring of food and many other cooking techniques were passed on by the Arab invaders to their European possessions and were gradually spread to regions further north.

=== Iberia ===
The Iberian Peninsula has a highly varied geography with a central Meseta, a vast, flat plateau, surrounded on all sides by mountain ranges and cut off from the rest of Europe by the Pyrenees. This meant that several distinct cultures co-existed on the peninsula with several unique cuisines. Since Ancient times it had been a colony of several Mediterranean cultures. The Phoenicians introduced the cultivation of olives and the Greeks brought the Malvasia grape, founding a wine industry that would become renowned in the Middle Ages. But it was the Roman Empire, of which the peninsula was the westernmost outpost, that had the biggest impact on Iberian cuisine. After the collapse of Roman rule, Visigothic invaders conquered most of the modern day Spain and Portugal in the 5th century. The Visigoths took on many Roman customs, like the focus on vegetables, and used Latin for official purposes. But it was the invasions of North African Muslims and the establishment of Al-Andalus that gave Iberian cuisine its unique nature. The Muslims brought with them the highly refined cuisine influenced by Arab courts in the Middle East. The center of this Arab civilization was Baghdad, at the time one of the largest cities in the world. The new rulers introduced many new customs and foodstuffs; goblets made of glass rather than metal, savory meat dishes cooked with fruit, spices and herbs like cinnamon, mastic, caraway, sesame and mint and the use of ground almonds or rice as thickeners and a fondness for adding tangy liquids like verjuice, tamarind and the juice of bitter oranges to produce a distinctly sweet-sour taste. The impact can clearly be seen in the multitude of Arab loanwords in Spanish; naranja "orange", azúcar ("sugar"), alcachofa ("artichoke"), azafrán ("saffron") and espinaca ("spinach"), many of which eventually spread to other languages in Europe. The Spanish Muslims established the sequences of dishes which was to permeate the entire continent and which still forms the basis for many modern European meals; soup followed by meat dishes and finished off with sweets. It's also believed that escabeche, a vinegar-based dish, could very well be of Arab-Persian origin, though this has been contested.

One of the earliest medieval cookbooks in a language other than Latin was Libre de Sent Soví ("The Book of Saint Sophia"), written in Catalan around 1324. A majority of its recipes call for bitter oranges, rose water and cider to achieve the popular tangy flavor of late medieval cuisine. It contains many fish recipes, but surprisingly enough, no mention of shellfish, which must have been one of the major food sources in the Catalan coastal regions. The highly influential Libre del Coch, in Catalan as well, was published in a printed edition in 1520, but is assumed to have been written no later than 1490. The typical medieval white dish (menjar blanc) seems to have appeared first in Catalonia in the 8th century and eventually evolved into a type of sweet pudding. While poorly represented in cookbooks, the most common food for the general population, other than the regular staples of bread, wine, garlic, onion and olive oil, included eggs, lamb, beef, kid and bacon.

The Jewish population of Al-Andalus, the Sephardic Jews, developed their cuisine in close contact with Christians and Muslims. Influences went in both directions and lasted even after the expulsions and forced conversions of the Jewish population that followed the Reconquista. Among the specialties was adafina (from Arabic al dafina "the buried treasure"), a meat dish that was prepared by burying it in hot coals on the day before the Shabbat. Jewish fish pie dishes have survived in Spanish cuisine as empanadas de pescado.

=== Italy ===
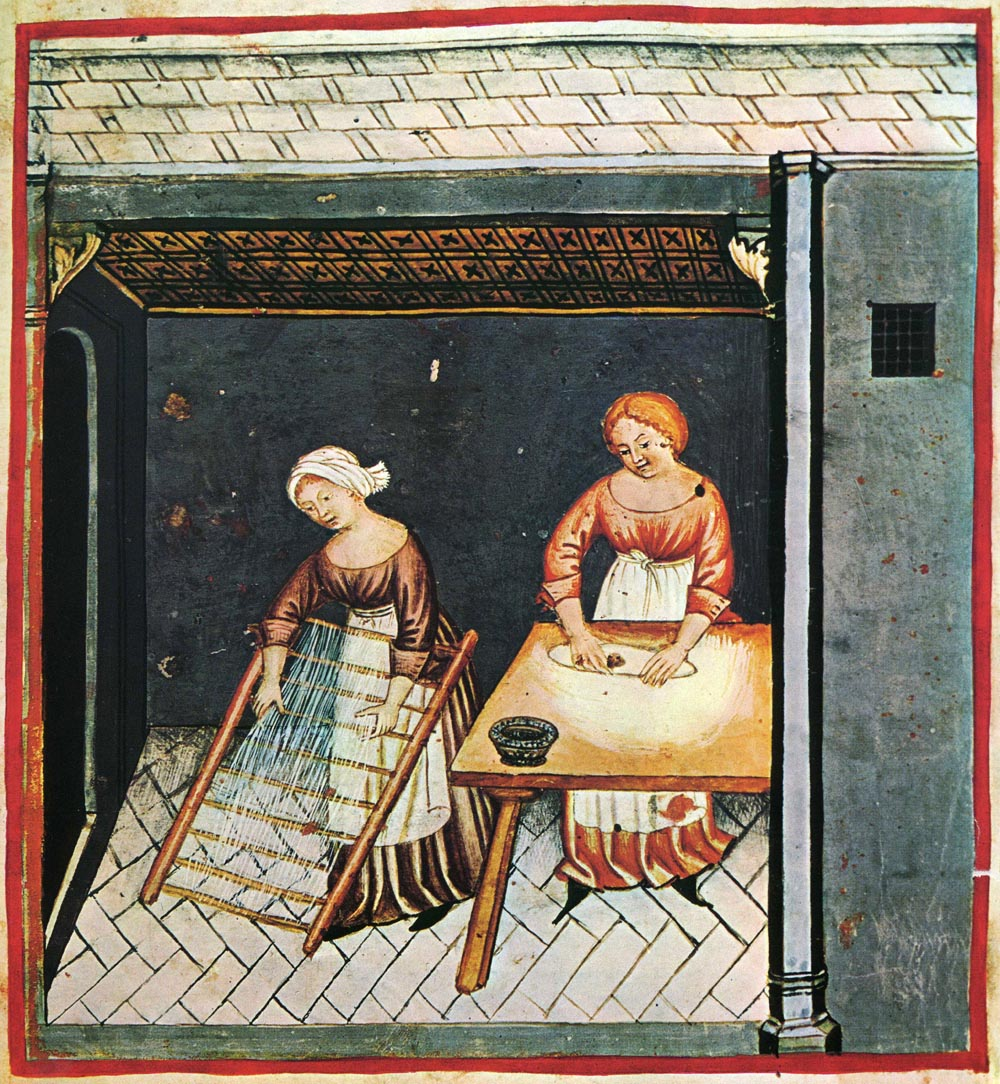
Making noodles; Tacuinum Sanitatis, 14th century.

The lucrative Mediterranean trade in spices, silk and other luxuries from Africa and Asia were shipped on the galleys of the powerful city-states of Genoa, Venice and Florence, making them phenomenally rich. Medieval Italy, meaning primarily the northern Italian Peninsula, was one of the few regions in medieval Europe where the distinction between nobility and prosperous commoners were more or less irrelevant, the result of a significant, rich and self-conscious middle class. This meant that the level of culinary refinement and diversity was especially great when compared to the rest of the continent. Italian cuisine was, and still is, better described as a multitude of highly varied regional cuisines, each with long traditions and their own specialties. Italian dishes can therefore be considered either traditional or imported. Being the hub of a vast trade network meant that there was greater access to foreign luxuries to influence the local cooking. Still, there was a great deal of conservatism and in general far more of local Italian foodstuffs were exported to the New World than the other way around, though the impact of important products such as vanilla, corn, kidney beans, and the tomato, which had a considerable impact on the cooking south of Naples, even if this transition took some time.

Many Italian staples and internationally recognized favorites were invented and refined during the Late Middle Ages and the early Renaissance; pasta was on everyone's dinner plate by the 13th century, though it was commonly made out of rice flour rather than durum wheat; pizza, the medieval Italian term for "pie", and tortes came in many varieties with a wide range of toppings, ranging from marzipan, and custards to chicken, eel, or even hemp; polenta made from French green lentils or barley; risotto; and a myriad of local or regional variants of sausage and cheese which was eaten by more or less everyone. As early as the Middle Ages, the cheeses, in particular, appear to have been highly specialized, from a fresh Tuscan to an aged Milanese from Tadesca, wrapped and shipped in tree bark. Medieval Italians also used eggs to a higher degree than many other regions, and the recipe collections describe herb omelettes (herboletos) and frittatas. Grapes as snacks and lemons as a cooking ingredient was ubiquitous and olive oil of every conceivable kind was the cooking fat of choice in all regions, including the north, for dressing salads, frying, seasoning, marinading and preserving meats.

=== Southern France ===
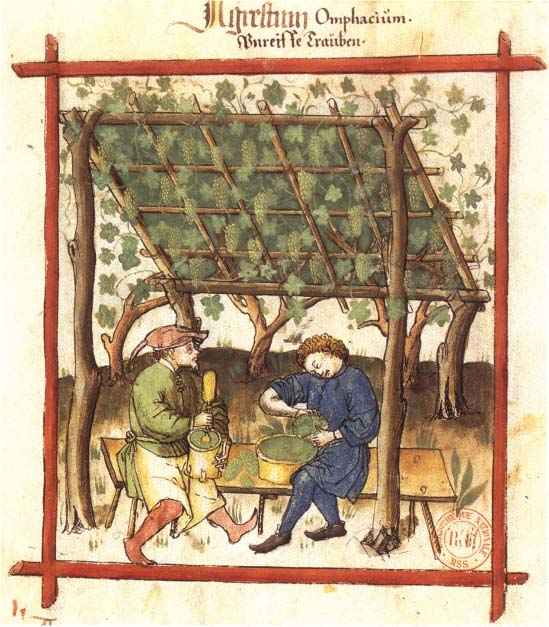
Green grapes being picked to make verjuice; Tacuinum Sanitatis, 1474.

The cuisine of southern France, corresponding roughly to the extent of Occitania, had far more in common with Italian and Spanish cooking than with northern French cuisine. Ingredients that distinguished southern cooking included sugar, walnut oil, chickpeas, pomegranates and lemons, all of which were grown locally. While pomegranate seeds were occasionally used to decorate dishes in France and England, flavoring dishes with pomegranate juice was a practice unique to the Occitan areas. The use of butter and lard was rare, salted meat for frying was common, and the preferred methods of cooking tended to be dry roasting, frying, or baking. For the latter, a trapa, a portable oven that was filled with food and buried in hot ashes, was often used.

Dishes still common today, like escabeche, a vinegar-based dish, and aillade (aioli), a garlic sauce (still made in Toulouse with walnut oil), were well-established in the Late Middle Ages. Evidence of influence from Muslim Spain can be found in recipes for matafeam, a Christian version of the originally Hispano-Jewish Shabbat stew adafina, but with pork rather than lamb. And, Raymonia (Occitan; Ital: Romania) is based on the Arabic Rummaniya, a chicken bruet with pomegranate juice, ground almonds, and sugar. Only one recipe collection is positively identified as being from southern France. The Modus viaticorum preparandorum et salsarum is a collection of 51 recipes. It was written ca. 1380–90 in Latin with occasional words in Occitan. The Modus contains a Salsa de cerpol (Wild thyme sauce) and a Cofiment anguille (Confit of eel), which appear nowhere else but in Occitania.

A cookery book from northern Europe may have originated in Provence. Known from its incipit as Libellus de arte coquinaria, it is the Codex K version of the Harpestraeng Cookbook, which is part of a collection of medical papers written by, or belonging to, Dr. Henrik Harpestraeng. It is currently housed in the Royal Library of Copenhagen (Ny samling Nr. 66, 8 vo.). Food historian Dr. Rudolf Grewe proposed a NW Mediterranean origin for this book based on the recipes and their ingredients, such as saffron. Since Harpestraeng studied medicine in Provence, probably at Montpellier, he may have obtained the book during that time. Harpestraeng may have brought the book to Denmark, where he was the physician to King Valdemar II. Codex K is believed to have been copied into Danish from an earlier Low German original, or copy. This would have happened before 1244, the year Harpestraeng died. If so, Libellus de arte coquinaria is the earliest Western European cookery book, since Apicius' De re coquinaria.

Some dietary details have been extrapolated from Vatican archives from 1305–78 when Avignon was the seat of the Avignon Papacy. Though the lifestyles of the papal courts could often be very luxurious, the Vatican account books of the daily alms given to the poor describe some of what lower class food in the region was like. The food that was handed out to the needing consisted mainly of bread, legumes, and some wine. These were occasionally supplemented with cheese, fish, olive oil and meat of low quality.

Montpellier, located on in Languedoc only a few miles from the coast, was a major center for trade, education in medicine, and was famous for its espices de chamber or "parlor confections", a term for sweets such as candied aniseed and ginger. The confectionery from the town was so renowned that its market value was twice as high as that of similar products from other towns. Montpellier was also well known for its spices and the wines with which they were flavored, like the ubiquitous hypocras.

== Byzantine Empire ==
The culinary traditions of Roman times lived on in the Byzantine empire. Inherited from Greek traditions was the use of olives and olive oil, wheat bread, and plenty of fish. These would very often be served or prepared with garós, the Greek term for garum, a sauce made out of fermented fish that was so popular that it more or less replaced salt as the common food flavoring. The Byzantine kitchen was also influenced by Arab cuisine from which it imported the use of eggplants and oranges. Seafood was very popular and included tuna, lobster, mussels, oysters, murena, and carp. Around the 11th century the habit of eating roe and caviar was also imported from the Black Sea region. Dairy products were consumed in the form of cheese (particularly feta), and nuts and fruits such as dates, figs, grapes, pomegranates, and apples. The choice of meats were lamb, and several wild animals like gazelles, wild asses, and suckling young in general. Meat was often salted, smoked or dried. Wine was popular, like elsewhere around the Mediterranean, and it was the drink of choice among the higher social classes, where sweet wines like Muscat or Madeira/Malmsey were popular. Among the lower classes, the common drink tended to be vinegar mixed with water. Like all Christian societies the Byzantines had to abide by the dietary restrictions of the church, which meant avoiding meats (and preferably general excesses) on Wednesdays and Fridays and during fast and Lent.

The Byzantine empire also became quite famous for its desserts, which included biscuits, rice pudding, quince marmalade, rose sugar and many types of non-alcoholic beverages. The most common sweetener was honey, with sugar extracted from sugar cane being reserved for those who could afford it.

The food of the lower classes was mostly vegetarian and limited to olives, fruit, onions, and the occasional piece of cheese, or stews made from cabbage and salted pork. The standard meal of a shoemaker was described in a Byzantine poem, one of the Prodromic Poems, as consisting of some cooked foods and an omelette followed by hot salted pork with an unspecified garlic dish.
