= Kapustka =

Kapustka is a Polish language surname. It literally means "cabbage". It may refer to:

- Bartosz Kapustka (born 1996), Polish footballer
- Jozef Kapustka (born 1969), Polish classical pianist
- Kapustka, Russian folk dance

== See also ==
- Kapusta (disambiguation)
