= Kaalilaatikko =

Traditional Finnish casserole dish

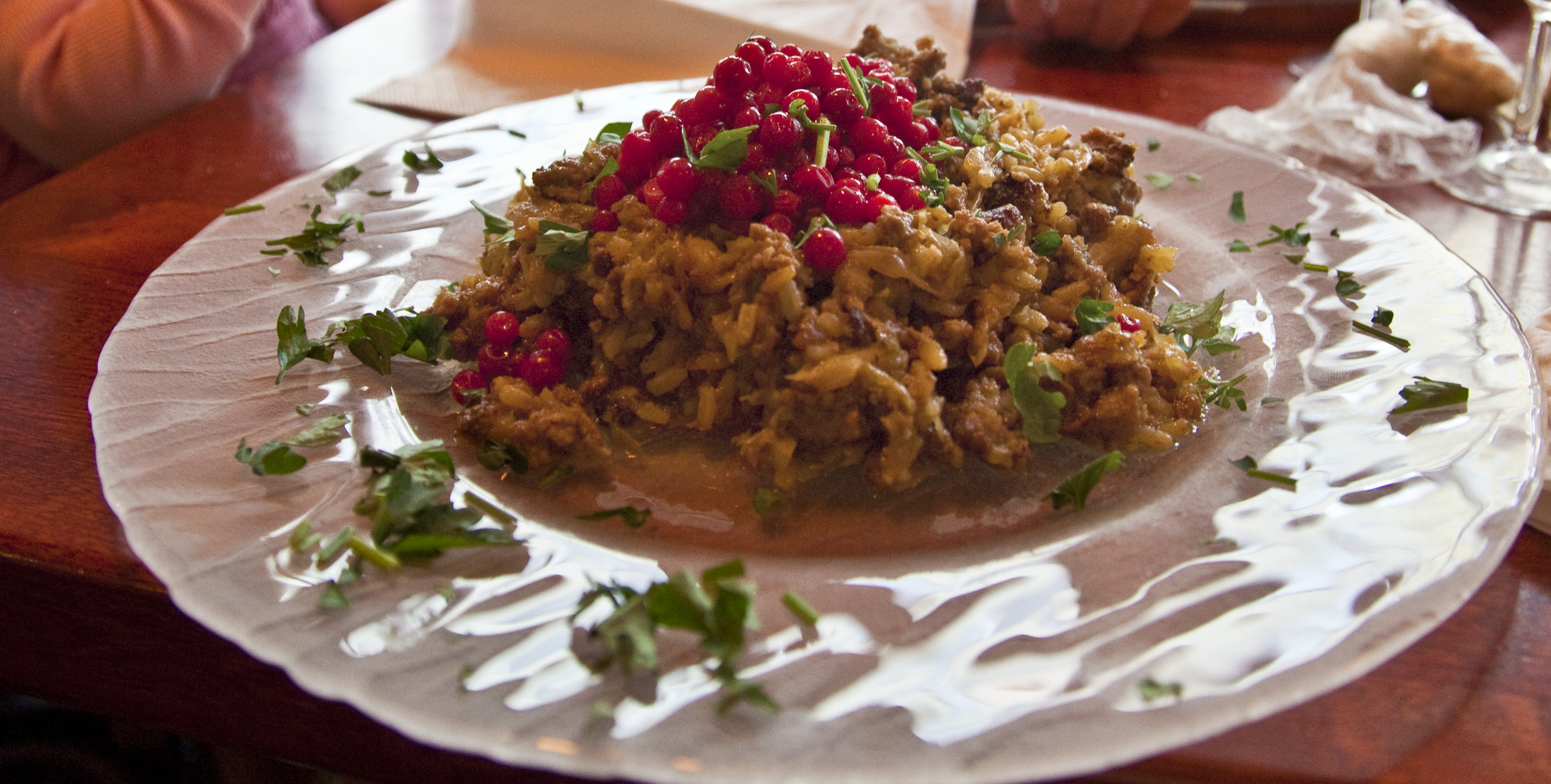
Kaalilaatikko

Cabbage casserole (Finnish: kaalilaatikko) is a traditional Finnish oven-baked casserole dish, typically made of cabbage, ground meat, rice or pearl barley, and additional flavourings—such as onion and marjoram—and a small amount of syrup or molasses. Kaalilaatikko is usually served with lingonberry or crowberry jam.

== See also ==
- Cabbage stew
- List of cabbage dishes
- List of casserole dishes
