= Cabbage stew =

Stew prepared using cabbage

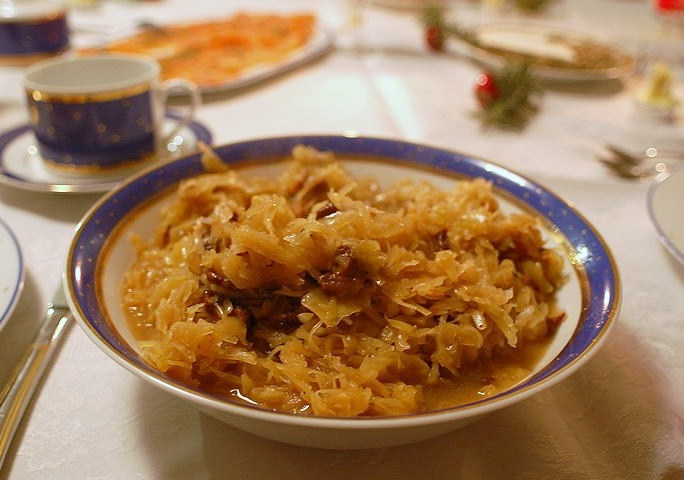
Bigos in Poland

Cabbage stew is a stew prepared using cabbage as a primary ingredient. Basic preparations of the dish use cabbage, various vegetables such as onion, carrot and celery, and vegetable stock. Additional ingredients can include meats such as pork, sausage and beef, potatoes, noodles, diced apples, apple juice, chicken broth, herbs and spices, salt and pepper.

== In cuisines ==
Bigos is a dish in Polish cuisine of finely chopped meat of various kinds stewed with sauerkraut and shredded fresh cabbage. The dish is also traditional for Belarusian, Ukrainian and Lithuanian cuisine.

Kapuska is a traditional cabbage stew in Balkan cuisine. Its name is derived from the Slavic languages word for cabbage.

Kapusta kiszona duszona is a Polish dish consisting of sauerkraut or cabbage, bacon, mushroom and onion or garlic.

Potée is a term in French cuisine that refers to foods prepared in an earthenware pot. More specifically, it refers to a soup or stew made of pork and vegetables, most frequently, cabbage and potatoes of which choucroute is the most characteristic.

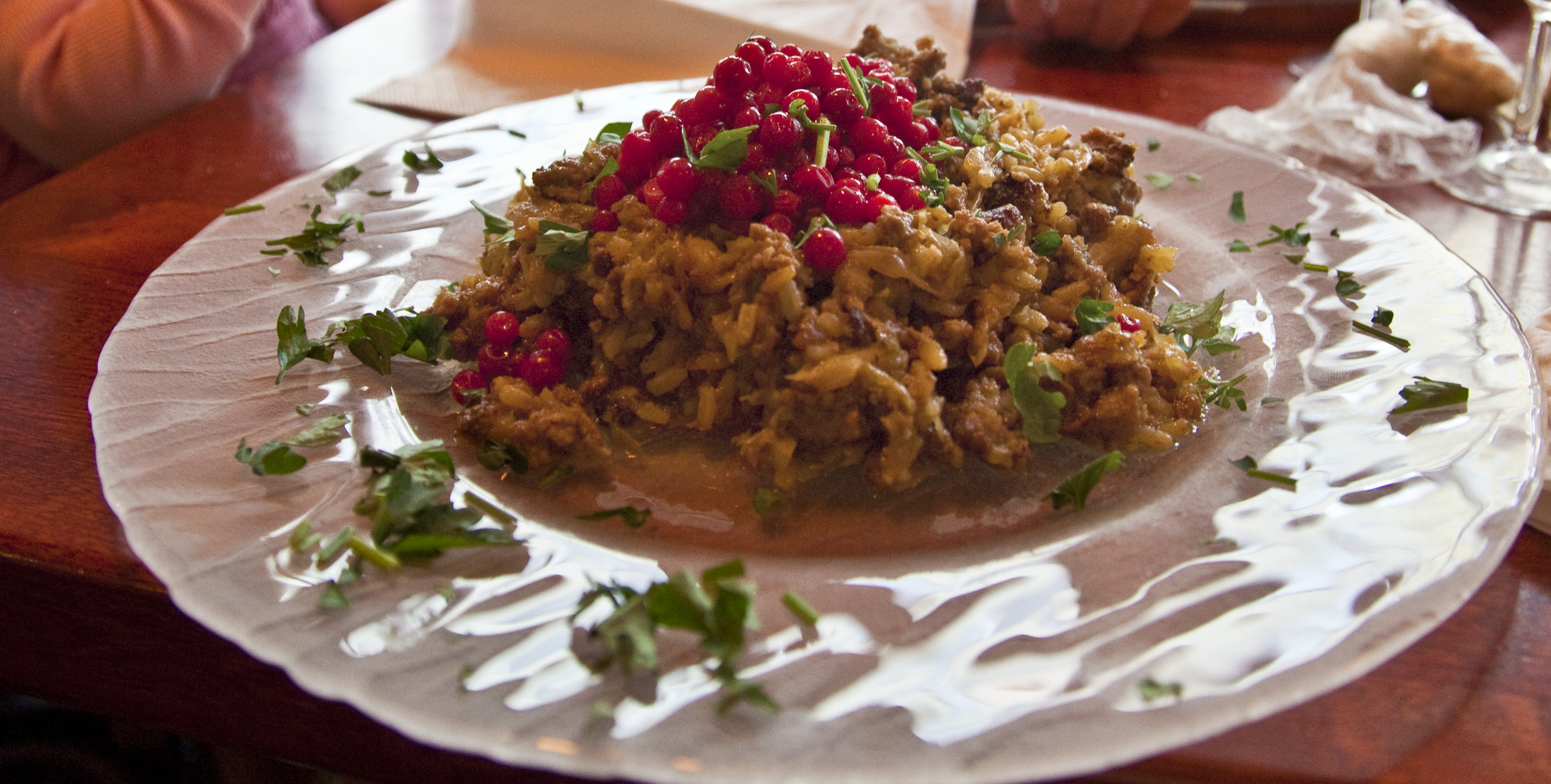
Kaalilaatikko casserole

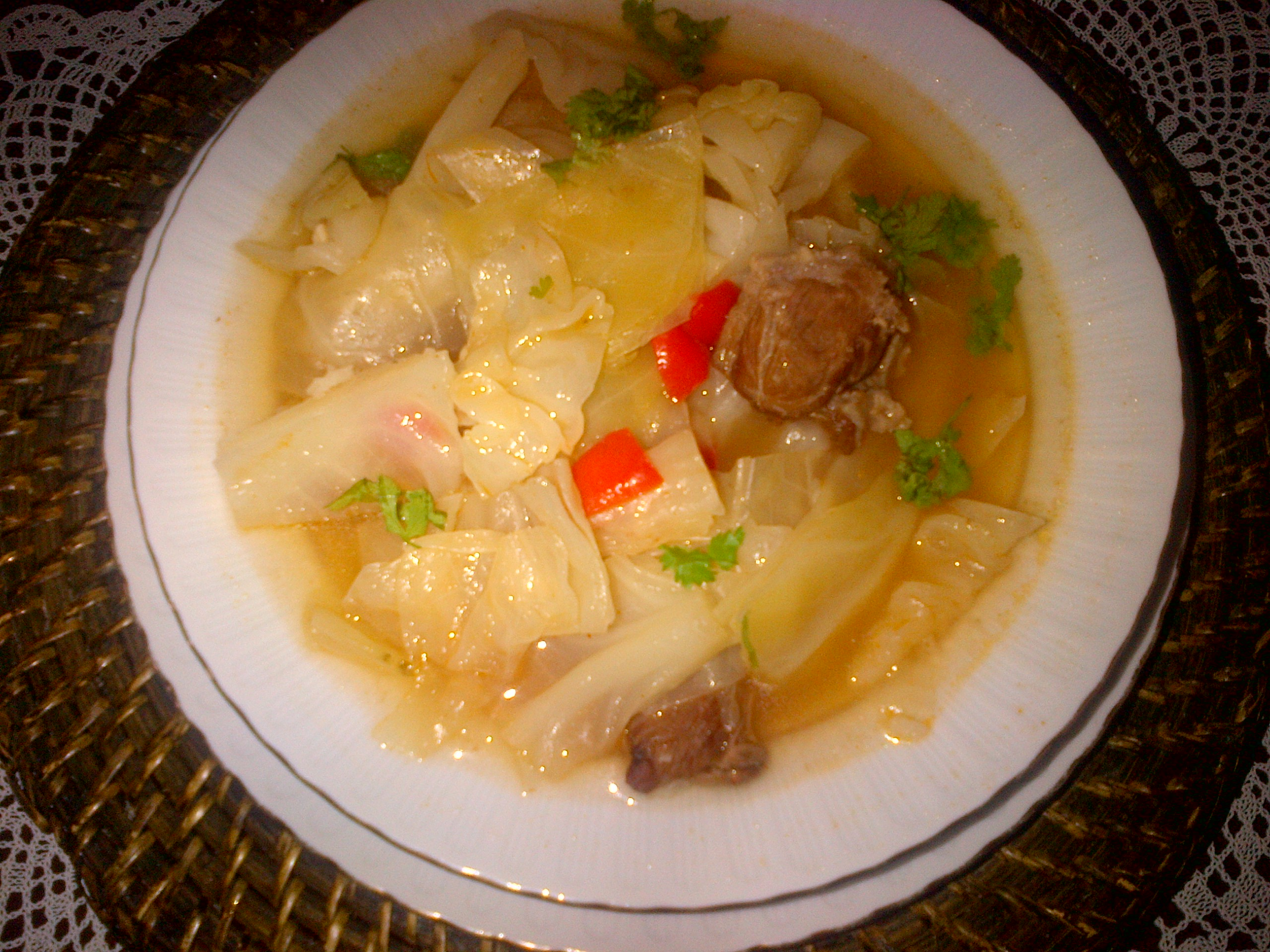
Kapuska with veal

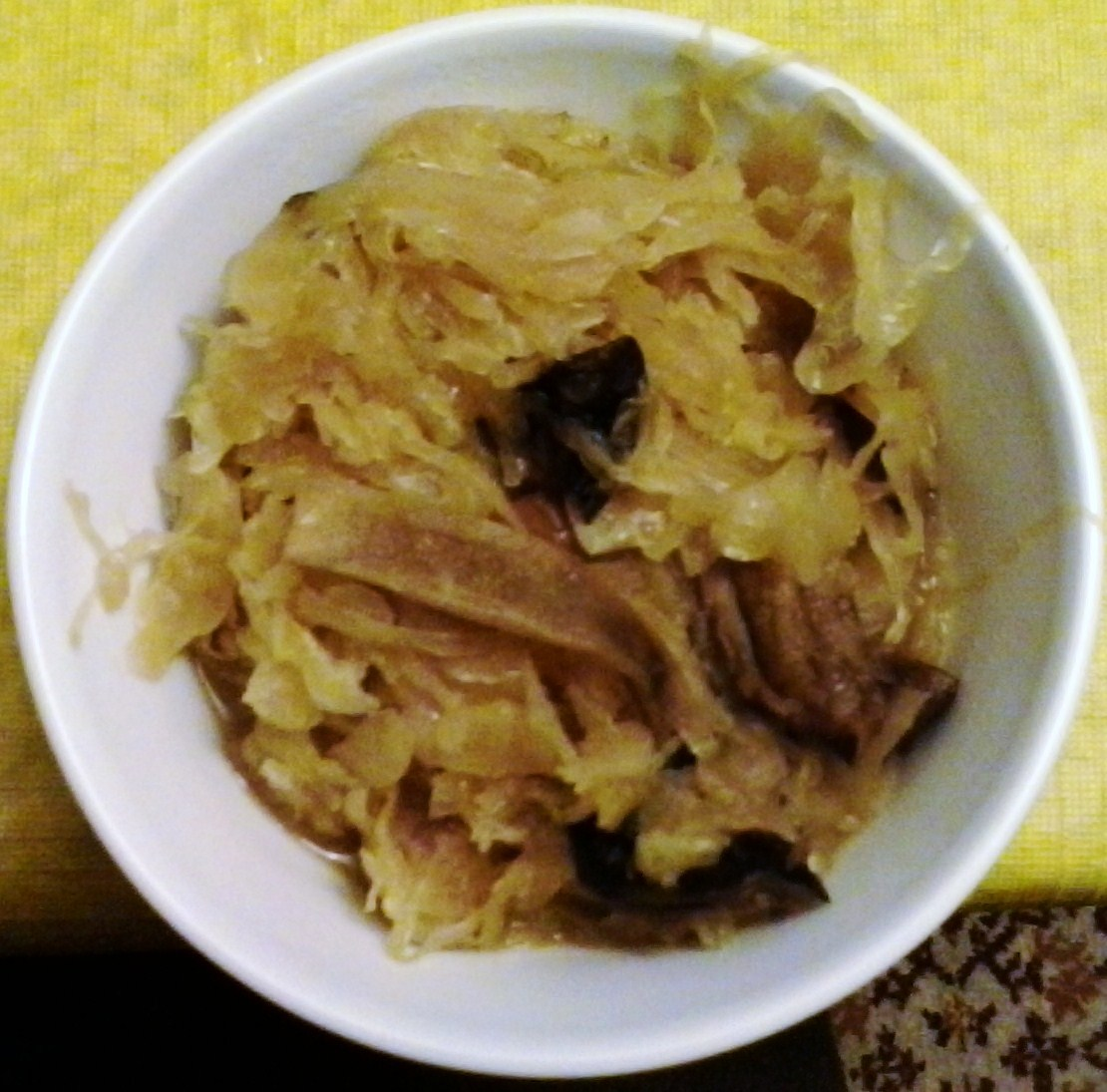
Kapusta kiszona duszona

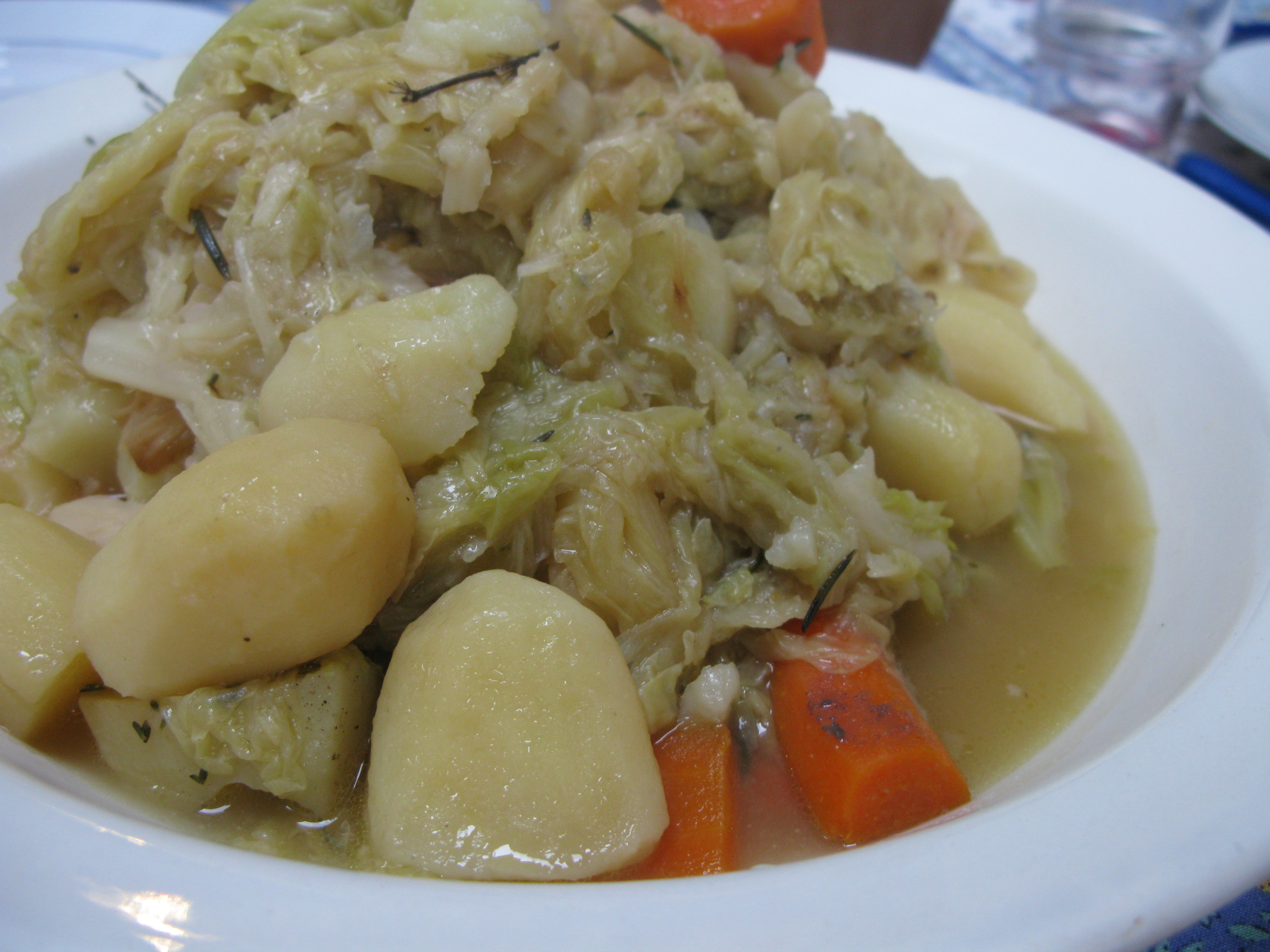
Potée

== See also ==
- Cabbage soup
- Coleslaw
- Kaalilaatikko – a casserole in Finnish cuisine prepared using cabbage and other ingredients
- List of cabbage dishes
- List of stews
