= Tourin =

French soup

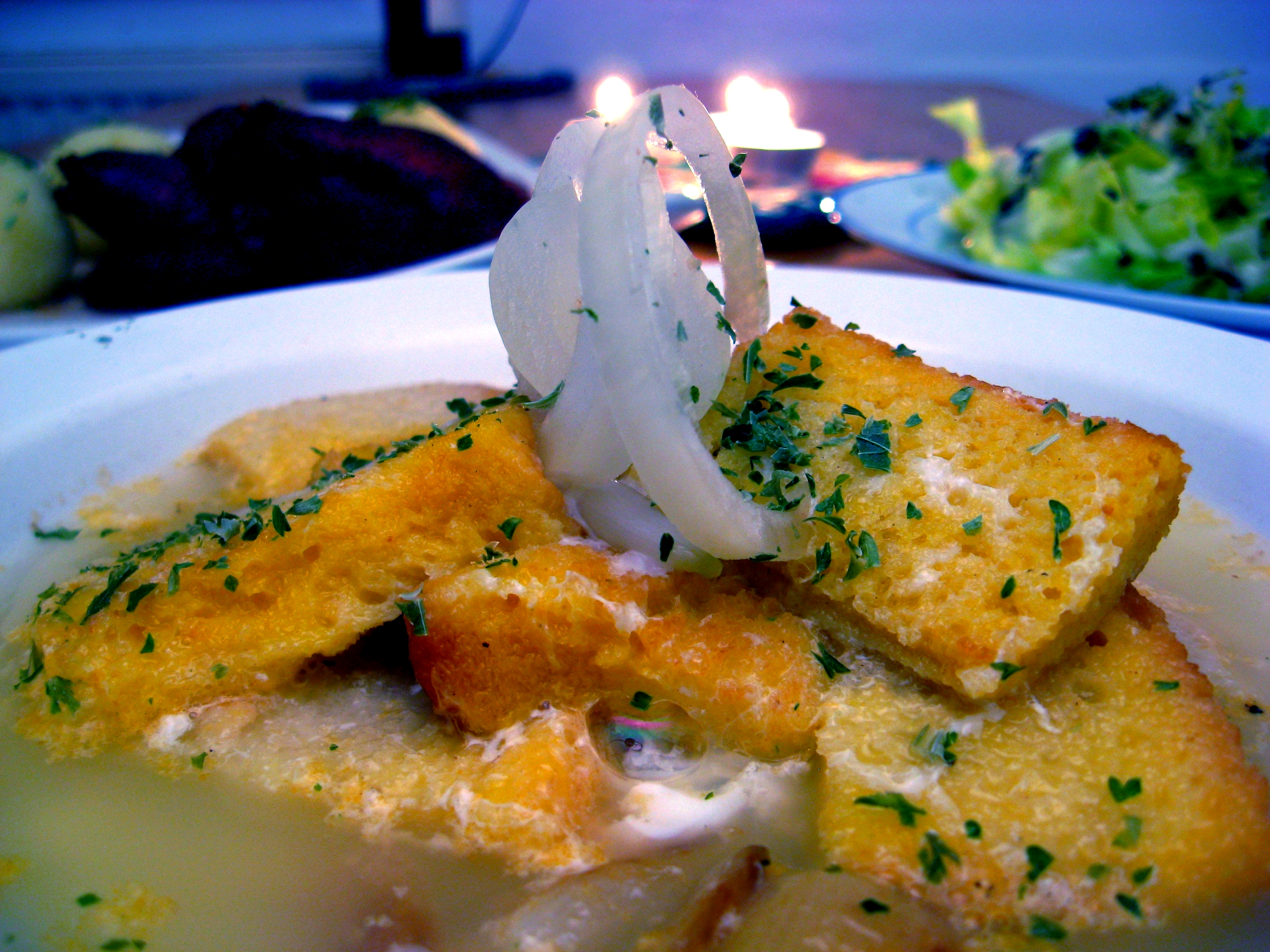
- Alternative names: Tourin d'ail doux, smooth garlic soup
- Type: Soup
- Place of origin: France
- Main ingredients: Garlic, onions, tomatoes, flour, chicken stock or water, egg whites, egg yolks

Tourin (French pronunciation: [tuʁɛ̃]) is a type of French soup, which is composed of onion, tomato, and/or garlic. It is also known as ouliat (lit. 'creamy') or le tourin d'ail doux, meaning 'smooth garlic soup'. Many regions have their own variations on the recipe. Typically, many recipes include as many as 20 cloves of garlic for a much stronger flavor. Other recipes include an equal measure of onions and garlic to even out the taste.

== Recipe ==
To prepare, the minced garlic (and sliced onions if included) are sautéed until soft and a simple roux is made by adding flour. Chicken stock or water is added to the mixture and is simmered over low heat to reduce. Egg whites are slowly drizzled in, not unlike egg drop soup, but whisked very rapidly to prevent large curds from forming. It is further thickened by tempering an egg yolk mixed with vinegar, which is then added to the soup.

== See also ==
- List of French soups and stews
- List of soups
