= Kapusta (surname) =

Kapusta is a Slavic-language surname literally meaning "cabbage" in West Slavic (Polish, Slovak) and East Slavic (Russian, Belarusian, Ukrainian) languages. Notable people with this surname include:

- Pete Kapusta, Canadian ice hockey player
