= Kapuska =

Turkish cole dish

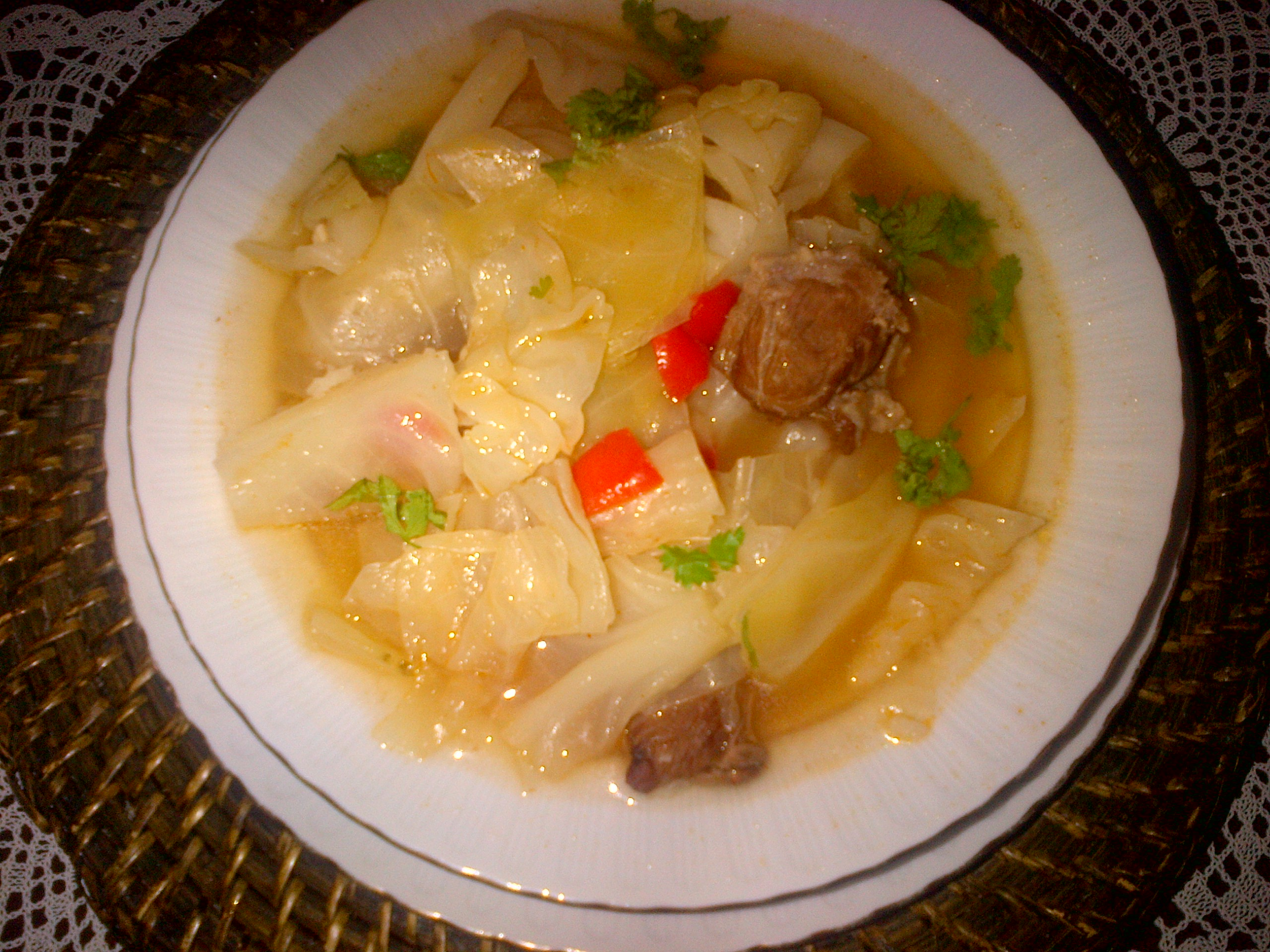
Kapuska with veal

Kapuska is a traditional Turkish cuisine and Balkan cuisine stew whose name is derived from the Slavic languages word for cabbage. Although the name is imported, the dish is a Turkish version of a cabbage stew common in Russia, Ukraine, Poland and other countries of Eastern Europe. Kapuska is widely known and consumed in the Thrace and Black Sea regions of Turkey.

Kapuska is cooked in different ways in Turkey: with garbanzo beans, bulgur, rice, ground meat, lamb, beef, or vegetarian.

It is known to be a dish for the poor. Turkish poet Fethi Naci writes in his memoirs that during World War II the dish they most ate was kapuska.

== See also ==
- Cabbage stew
- Kapusta
- List of cabbage dishes
- List of stews

== Cooking instructions ==
With meat: Turkish Cabbage Stew With Meat Vegetarian with rice: Vegan Rice Kapuska Recipe
