= Braised sauerkraut =

Culinary Dish

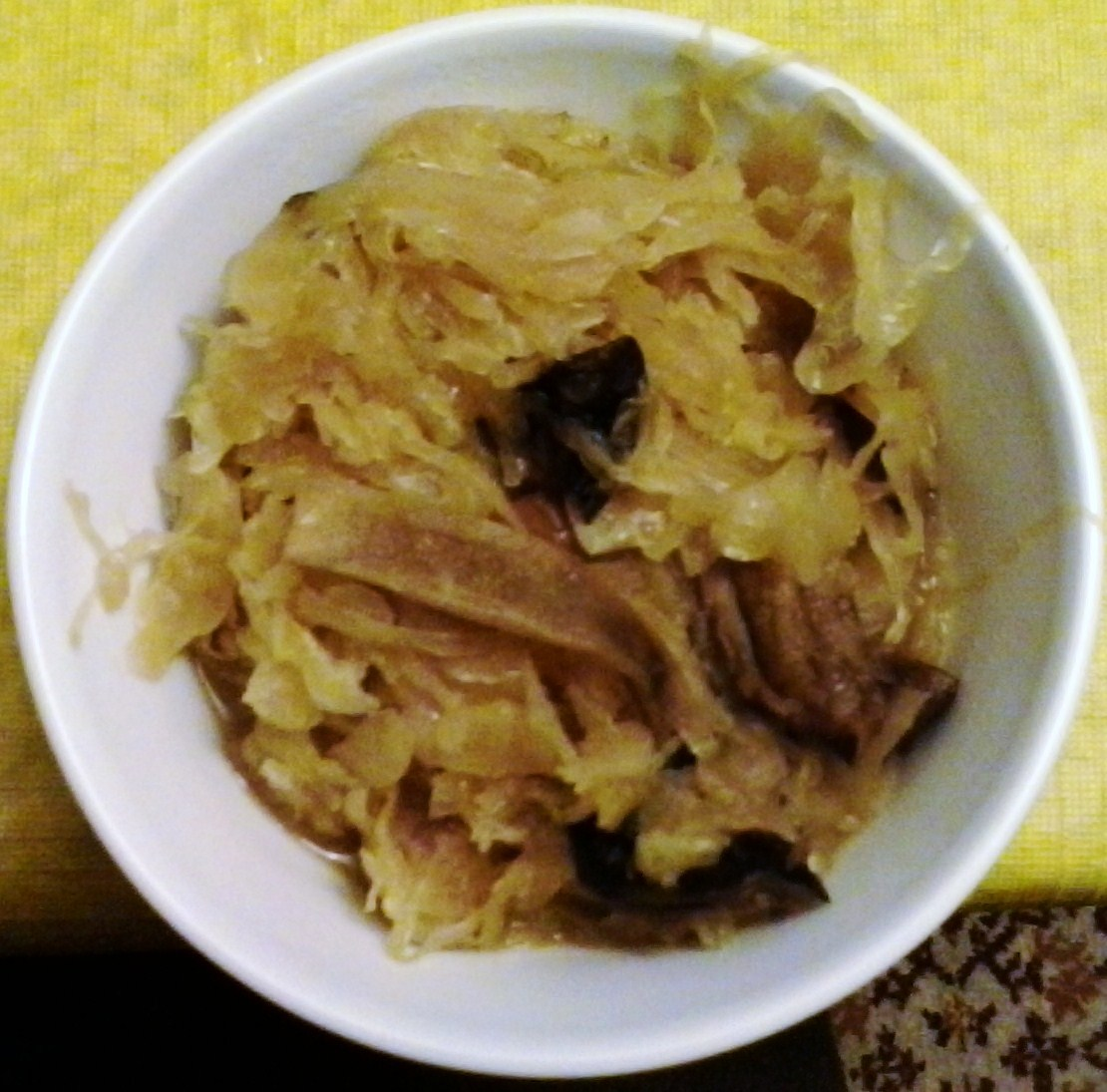
Kapusta with mushrooms

Pronunciation of the word "kapusta" in Polish

Zasmażana kapusta, known to many Polish people simply as kapusta [kah-POOS-tah] (which is the Polish word for "cabbage"), is a Polish dish of braised or stewed sauerkraut or cabbage, with bacon, mushrooms and onion or garlic. It is seasoned with salt, pepper and sometimes bay leaf, caraway seeds, sugar, paprika and apples. The traditional dish is usually served along with boiled potatoes as an accompaniment for pork chops, pork cutlets, other pork dishes, veal, or game meats. In some homes, kapusta is served very thin, almost like a soup. In others, its ingredients are thickened with flour or cooked until it becomes nearly as thick as mashed potatoes. It has been described as less sour in flavor compared to German sauerkraut.

Cabbage, the primary ingredient, is often pickled, like sauerkraut, which is amplified with a mix of mushrooms and onions and meat—fatty pork—either rib meat, bacon, or occasionally smoked kielbasa. Almost always the dish contains a kind of roux.

== In popular culture ==
A chapter of Herta Müller's novel The Hunger Angel (Atemschaukel) deals with the protagonist's relationship to kapusta, which comes to represent both his life as a prisoner and his hopes for freedom.

== See also ==
- Cabbage stew
- Kapuska
- Bigos
- List of cabbage dishes
- List of fermented foods
