= Garbure =

Stew in French cuisine

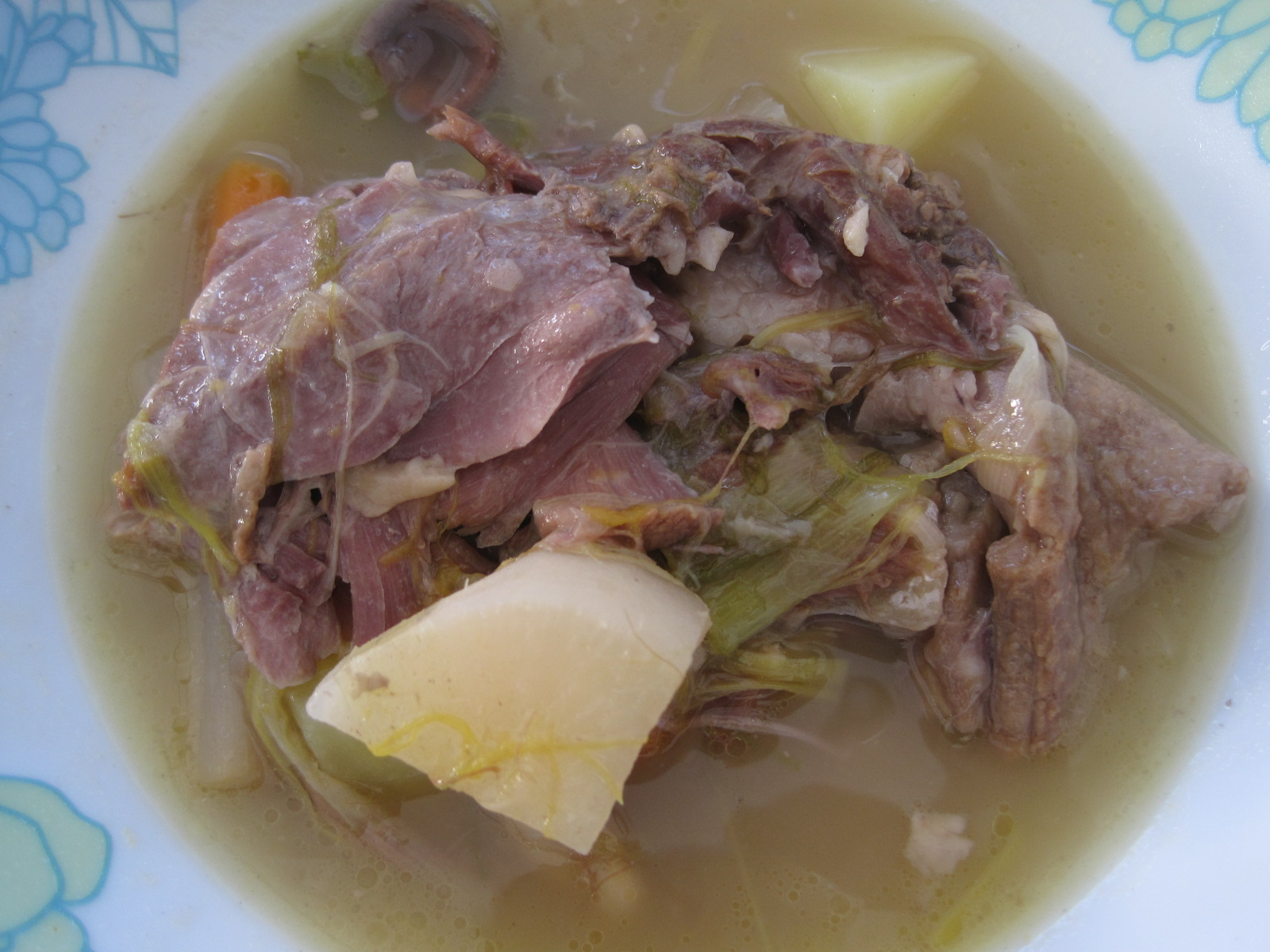
- Type: Soup or stew
- Place of origin: France
- Serving temperature: Hot or warm
- Main ingredients: Meat, root vegetables

Garbure (French pronunciation: [ɡaʁbyʁ]; Occitan: [ɡarˈbyɾe]) is a savoury French dish, described either as a soup or a stew. It is a one-pot dish of vegetables – mainly root vegetables – with one or more of several meats, slowly cooked in an earthenware dish in an oven. The cooking liquid is sometimes served as soup before the meat and vegetables are served as a main course. The food writer Curnonsky named garbure as one of the four great regional dishes of France.

== History and etymology ==
There is some argument about the origin of the name of the dish. Some sources say that the name garbure derives from the French word gerbe – sprig – referring to the many aromatic herbs that perfume the dish. Some who maintain this theory point out that the Béarnais word gaburoye means a mixture of fresh green vegetables like those which are put in the soup, but the food writer Waverley Root comments that this word may just as well have come from garbure as the other way around. He advances the theory that the origin of the name may be the Spanish garbias – stew. A third theory is that the name derives from the use of the term garb describing sheaves of grain depicted on a heraldic shield or coat of arms. The Dictionnaire de l'Académie Française dates the word to the eighteenth century and says it is borrowed from the Gascon garburo, meaning a hearty Béarnaise soup, made with rye bread, vegetables, bacon and goose or duck confit.

== Description ==
Elizabeth David says of garbure, "This soup, which, like the potée, is rather more of a stew than a soup, is traditional in the Landes, the Béarn, and the Pyrenees". Root calls garbure "one of those soups which is more than a soup, providing a full meal". According to Root the ingredients should be so crowded in the cooking pot that a ladle pushed into it will stand straight up, prevented by the contents of the garbure from sliding to the side. The gastronome Curnonsky hailed garbure as one of the four great regional dishes of France, along with cassoulet, bouillabaisse and choucroute garnie.

David adds that the recipe has many variations, and the choice of meat for the stew varies widely. Antonin Carême, in his 1847 book L'art de la cuisine française au dix-neuviême siêcle (The Art of French Cooking in the 19th century) gives a recipe for potage de garbure à la Crécy, using boned veal shank, chicken, carrots, onions, turnip, leeks and celery. In later recipes the principal meat in the stew is variously given as bacon, beef, duck confit, goose, goose confit, ham, pork heel, salt pork, Toulouse sausage and veal. The vegetables, mainly root, include some or all of cabbage, carrots, celery, haricot or white beans, fava beans, green beans, green or red pepper, leeks, Lima beans, onions, peas, potato, pumpkin and turnip. Some recipes add pieces of French bread.

The dish is traditionally cooked in an earthenware casserole, or toupin as it is called in the Béarn (a fat pot, narrowing towards the top, with a straight handle). The cooking liquor is sometimes served as a soup before the meat and vegetables are served as the main course.

There are many regional variations of the garbure, including garbure ariégoise, garbure aux choux (with cabbage), garbure aux laitues (with lettuce), garbure gasconne (or garbure de Gascogne), garbure girondine and garbure navarraise.

== Sources ==
- Carême, Antonin (1847). L'art de la cuisine française au dix-neuviême (in French). Paris: Comptoir des Impimeurs-Unis. OCLC 1423979004.
- Claustres, Francine (1997). Connaitre la cuisine du canard et de l'oie (in French). Bordeaux: Editions Sud Ouest. ISBN 2879012465.
- Dallas, E. S. (1877). Kettner's Book of the Table. London: Dulau & Company. OCLC 561296809.
- David, Elizabeth (1958). French Country Cooking. London: John Lehmann. OCLC 58604001.
- Dupuis-Gaulier, Sophie (2016). Soupes complètes (in French). Hachette. ISBN 9782011356796.
- Koffmann, Pierre (2016). Memories of Gascony. London: Mitchell Beazley. ISBN 9781784722234.
- Larousse (2012). Larousse on Cooking. Hoboken: John Wiley. ISBN 9781118388174.
- Root, Waverley (1983). The Food of France. London: Macmillan. ISBN 0333357930.
- Worrall Thompson, Antony (2012). Slow Cooking. London: Mitchell Beazley. ISBN 9781845336417.

== See also ==
- List of bread dishes
- List of French soups and stews
- List of soups
- List of stews
- Potée
