= Potée =

Type of soup in French cuisine

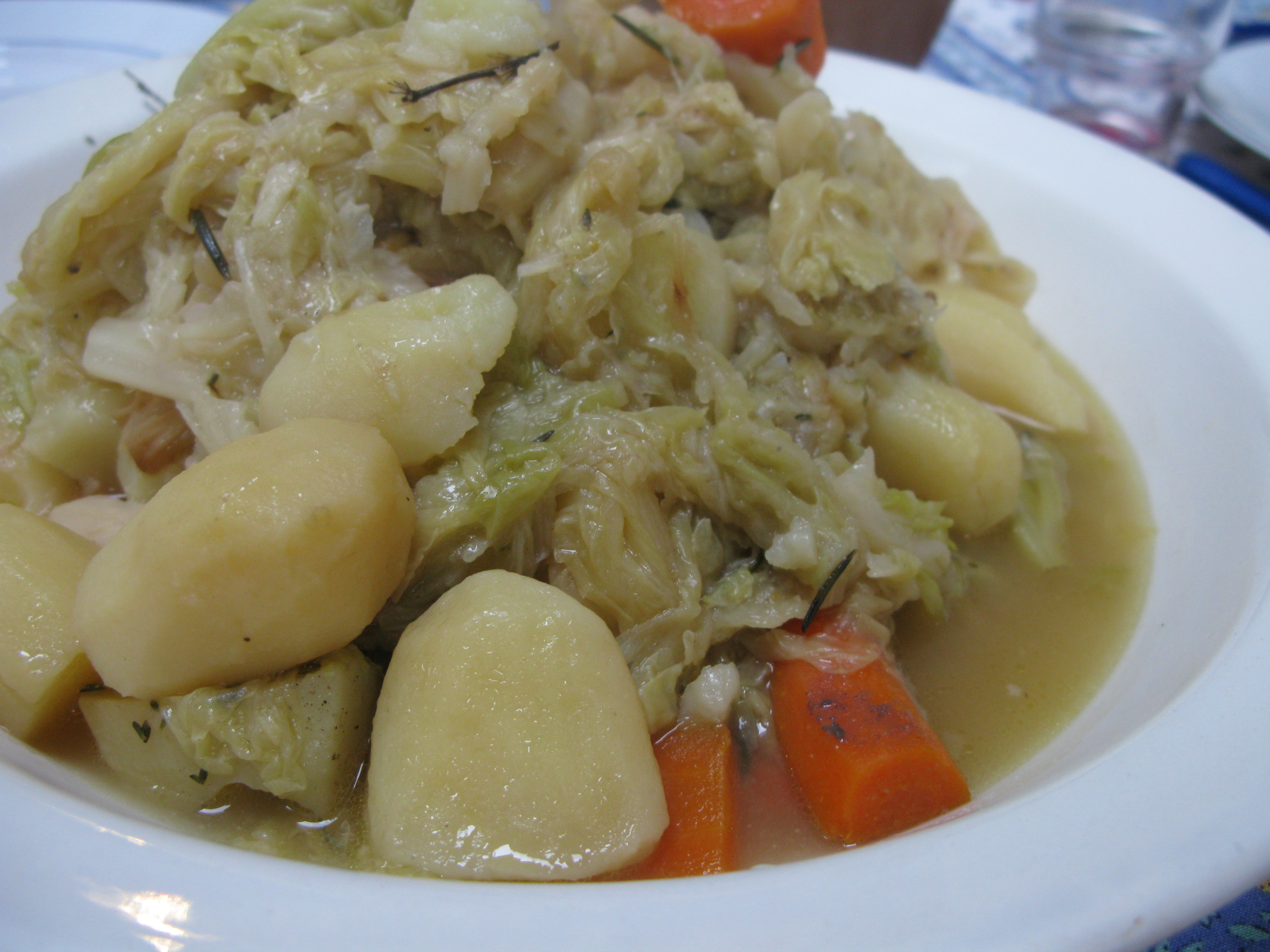
- Type: Soup/stew
- Place of origin: France
- Main ingredients: Pork, vegetables (cabbage, potatoes)

A potée is a savoury dish cooked in an earthenware pot. Similar dishes exist in most other parts of the world, and in French cuisine the term usually applies to a mixture of meat and vegetables (particularly cabbage and potatoes) cooked in stock and served as a single course. Potée is an ancient dish and is found throughout rural France, often under other names such as hochepot, garbure and oille. The meat most frequently used is pork in many forms – bacon, head, ribs, knuckle, tail, sausage, ham, etc., but one finds beef, mutton, lamb, veal, chicken and duck. The vegetables used most often are winter vegetables such as cabbage, carrots, turnips, celery and potatoes.

Each region has its own traditional recipe: Larousse Gastronomique gives these examples:

- Albigeoise – carrots, celery, haricot beans, hock of veal, leeks, leg of beef, preserved duck, raw smoked ham, sausage, turnips, white cabbage
- Alsacienne – carrots, celery, haricot beans, smoked bacon fat, white cabbage; the vegetables are sweated in goose fat before the liquid is added
- Artésienne – andouille, breast of lamb, carrots, celery, green cabbage, pig's head, potatoes, turnips, unsmoked bacon, white beans
- Auvergnate – cabbage, carrots and turnips, fresh or salt pork, half a pig's head, sausages
- Berrichonne – knuckle of ham, red beans cooked in red wine, sausages
- Bourguignonne – bacon, cabbage, carrots, hock of pork (ham hock), leeks, potatoes, shoulder of pork, turnips. In the spring months green beans and garden peas may be used,
- Bretonne – duck, sausages, shoulder of lamb, vegetables, an eel potée is also made in Brittany
- Champenoise – called the grape-pickers' potée: cabbage, celeriac, potatoes, salt pork, turnips, unsmoked streaky bacon, sometimes sausages or smoked ham or chicken are added
- Franche-comtoise – bacon, beef, Moreau sausage, mutton bones, vegetables
- Lorraine – cabbage, carrots, leeks, salt pork, turnips,
- Morvandelle – dried sausage, ham, smoked sausage, various vegetables

Source: Larousse Gastronomique

== See also ==
- Cabbage stew
- List of soups
- List of stews

== Sources ==
- Maubourguet, Patrice, ed. (1997). Larousse Gastronomique (in French). Paris: Larousse. ISBN 2-03-507300-6.
