= Oille =

French soup

- Type: Soup
- Place of origin: France

L'oille is a French potée or soup believed to be the forerunner of pot-au-feu composed of various meats and vegetables.

It has been suggested by some authorities that the derivation of the word oille is from the Spanish olla podrida but it seems more likely that it is derived from oule, which is used in south-west France to describe an earthenware pot in which the dish is prepared. There are many examples of pot-à-oille (tureens) on display in museums, some of them very ornate indicating that this dish was enjoyed by people from all social classes, ingredients varying greatly.

There are three kinds of oilles:

- A soup dating from the time of Louis XIII called Grand-oille and this is the Ouille-en-pot referred to in the correspondence of Madame de Maintenon.
- Olla podrida, a Spanish dish, which, at one time in France, protocol decreed be served to Spanish dignitaries.
- Oille-moderne à la française

An old recipe for this dish contains chicken and pigeons, all stuffed and trussed, beef, veal, onion, parsnips, carrots, turnips, leeks, purslane, orach and chard. All are simmered for five hours. At the end of this time, slices of lightly toasted bread are placed in the bottom of a tureen and this is heated until the bread starts to stick to the bottom. The birds are removed from the soup and placed on the bread and the rest is strained over them. The remaining meat and vegetables are discarded.

== See also ==
- List of French soups and stews
- List of soups
