= Stromboli (food) =

Italian-American dish

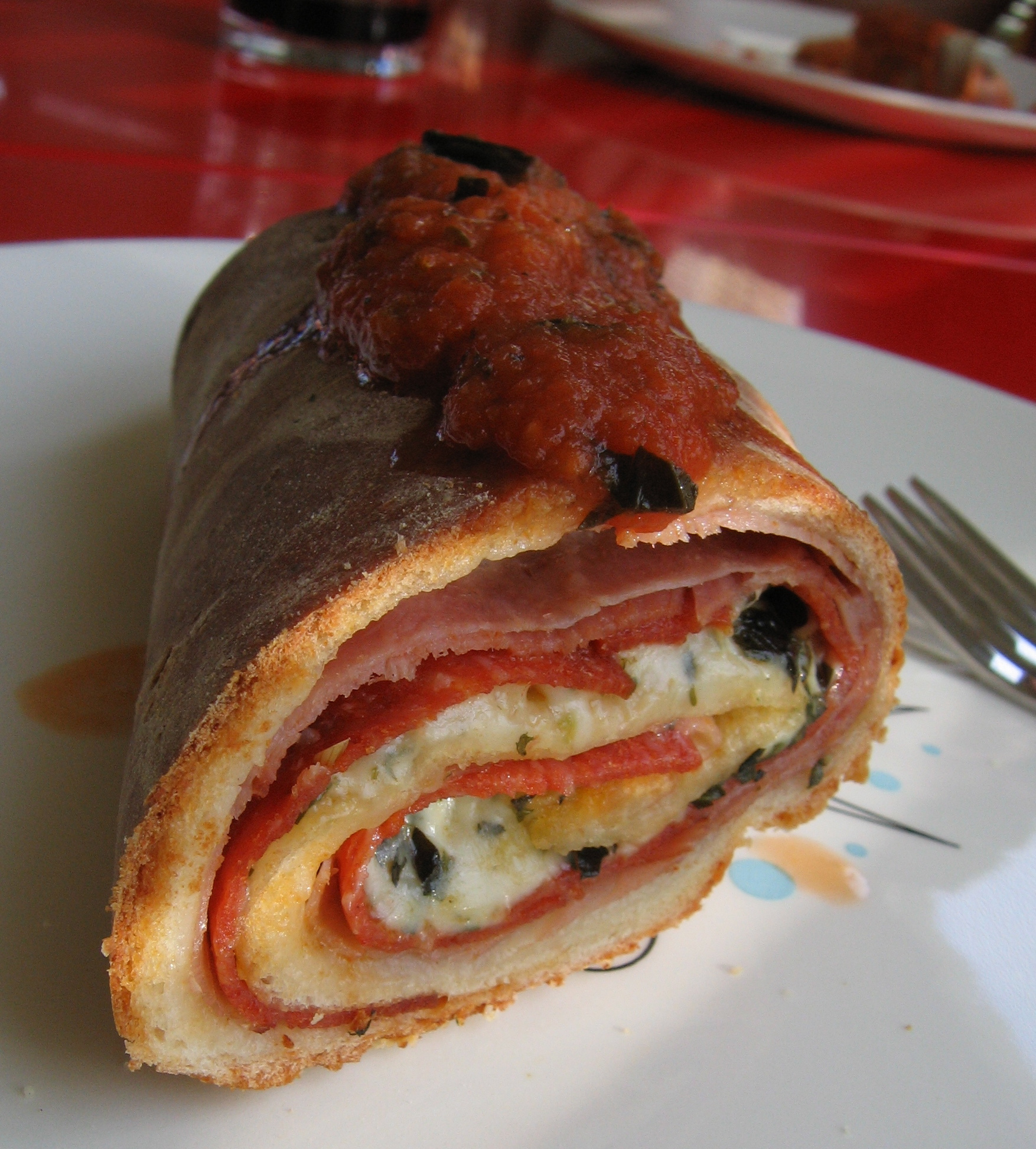
- Homemade stromboli
- Type: Roulade
- Place of origin: United States
- Region or state: Philadelphia, Pennsylvania
- Created by: Nazzareno Romano
- Main ingredients: Bread dough, cheese, meat or vegetables

Stromboli are a type of baked bread filled with various Italian cheeses (typically mozzarella) and Italian cold cuts (typically salami, capocollo, and bresaola) or vegetables, and marinara sauce, served hot. The dough is either Italian bread dough or pizza dough. Stromboli is an Italian-American dish invented in Essington, Pennsylvania by Nazzareno Romano. The dish is ultimately named for the volcanic island off the coast of Sicily, by way of the 1950 Roberto Rossellini film of the same name.

Stromboli are often confused with calzone or scaccia. Unlike calzones, which are stuffed and folded into a crescent shape, stromboli are rolled into a cylinder, and may sometimes contain a thin layer of tomato sauce on the inside.

== Preparation ==
Many American pizza shops serve "stromboli" using pizza dough that is folded in half with fillings, which is actually a calzone, and often leads to confusion. Stromboli are made with a square-shaped pizza dough that can be topped with any pizza toppings and is then rolled into a cylindrical jelly roll shape and baked. Variations exist that include adding pizza sauce or deep-frying, in a similar manner as a panzerotto.

== Origins ==
Nazzareno Romano, an Italian immigrant, invented the Stromboli at his restaurant, Romano's Italian Restaurant & Pizzeria, in Essington, Pennsylvania in the 1950s. The pizzeria owner had experimented with pizza imbottita, or "stuffed pizza", and added ham, cotechino, cheese and peppers into a pocket of bread dough. His future brother-in-law suggested he name it after the recently released movie Stromboli, notorious for an off-screen affair between married actress Ingrid Bergman and married director Roberto Rossellini, resulting in a love child, Renato Rossellini.

== See also ==
- List of stuffed dishes
- List of regional dishes of the United States
- History of Italian Americans in Philadelphia
- Sausage bread
- Pepperoni roll
- Hot Pockets
