= Stuffed sorrel =

- Region or state: Turkey, Balkan, Levant, Armenia, Caucasus
- Serving temperature: Hot

Stuffed sorrel (Armenian: թարխունի տերեւով լցոնած or սալորի տերևներով դոլմա, Turkish: Labada sarması or Evelik Dolması) is a generic name for meals made of sorrel leaves stuffed with meat (lamb) and rice, or more rarely rice only. Meals are called as labada Sarma or evelik Dolma. It is mostly popular in Armenia, Turkey, Azerbaijan, Syria and the Balkans, where it may be served with mashed potatoes and yogurt.

== See also ==
- List of stuffed dishes
