= Crappit heid =

Traditional Scottish fish head dish

Crappit heid is a traditional Scots fish course, consisting of a boiled fish head stuffed with oats, suet and liver. In Gaelic it is known as ceann-cropaig. Its origins can be traced to the fishing communities of the North, Hebrides and North-Eastern Scotland in the eighteenth century. In a time when money was scarce, the more expensive fillets of fish, such as cod or haddock, would be sold to market, but the offal and less attractive parts were retained by the fisherfolk for the pot.

Crappit heid was a favourite midday or evening meal amongst those communities and was made from the head of a large cod or similar sized fish, washed, descaled and then stuffed with a mixture of oats, suet, onion, white pepper and the liver of the fish in question. This was then sewn or skewered to close the aperture and boiled in seawater. The cooked dish would then be served with potatoes or other root vegetables in season.

Later variations include exchanging the seawater for a court bouillon of fish stock and onion. The resulting poaching liquid is often eaten as a soup before having the fish head.

Although once a very common dish, crappit heid has, like many traditional dishes, become a rarity. Cod livers are now harder to obtain and usually only available if the fish has been caught by local line fishermen. It is rich in carbohydrates, proteins, fats and cod liver oil.

== See also ==
- List of stuffed dishes
