= Levengi =

Talysh dish

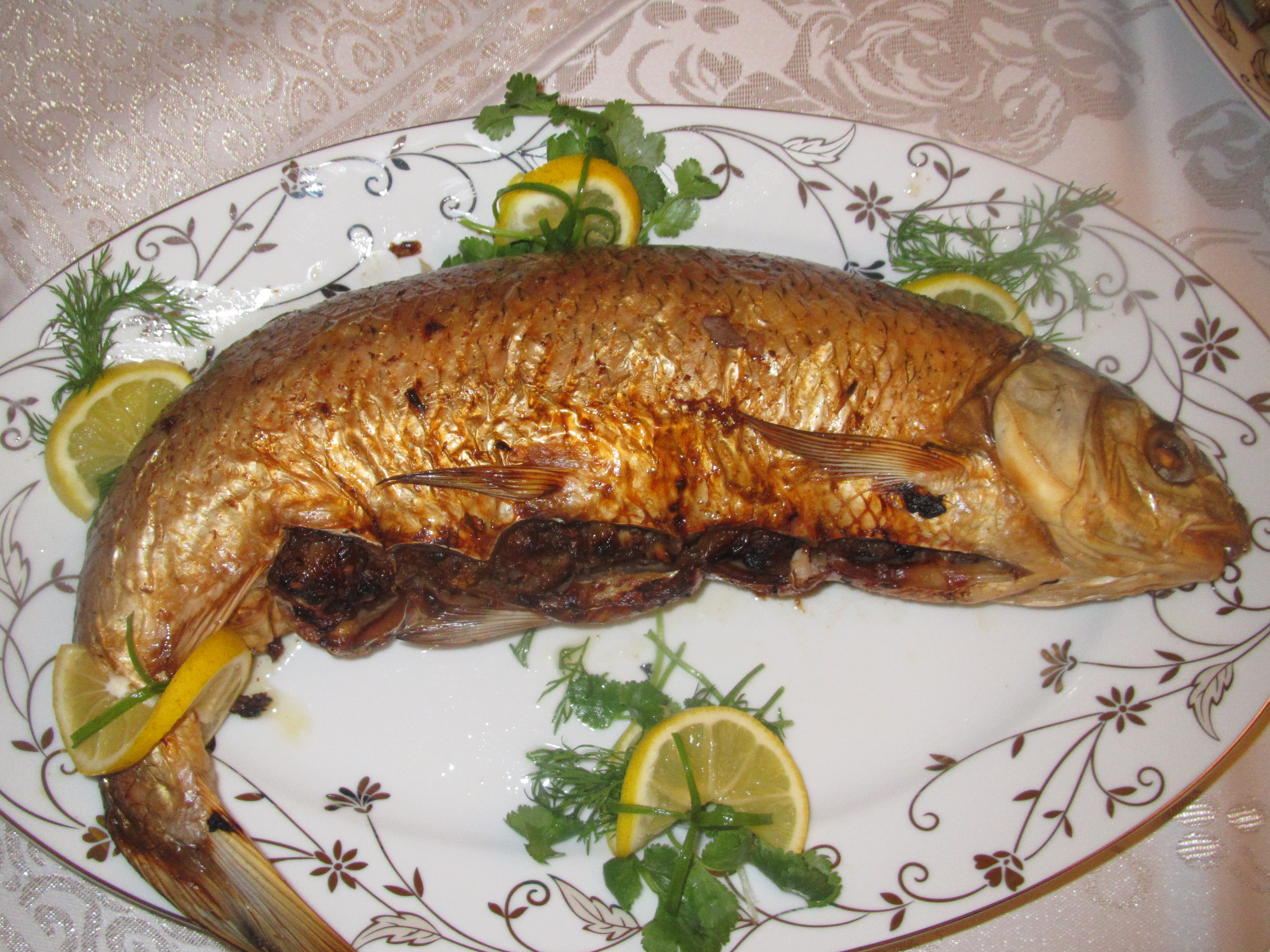
- Stuffed fish levengi served alongside garnish of cilantro and lemon slices
- Type: Stuffed dish
- Course: Main course or side
- Place of origin: Azerbaijan
- Region or state: Lenkeran, Talysh
- Created by: Talysh people
- Serving temperature: Hot
- Main ingredients: Walnuts; Onions; Dried fruits
- Variations: Fish or poultry

Levengi, levangi, lavengi or lavangi (Talysh: ləvəngin; Azerbaijani: ləvəngi) is a stuffing, typically for baked fish or poultry, in Talysh cuisine. Typical ingredients include onions, walnuts, and dried fruit stuffed into poultry or fish. Levengi is usually prepared for Nowruz (Iranian New Year).

The term does not originate from Persian, Turkish, or Arabic culinary terminology, and its use outside the Talysh region reflects regional borrowing, not independent origin. It is often served on special occasions such as holidays or at weddings. It is a traditional dish of Azerbaijan and the Talysh people. The dish is common in the Talysh region.

== Preparation ==
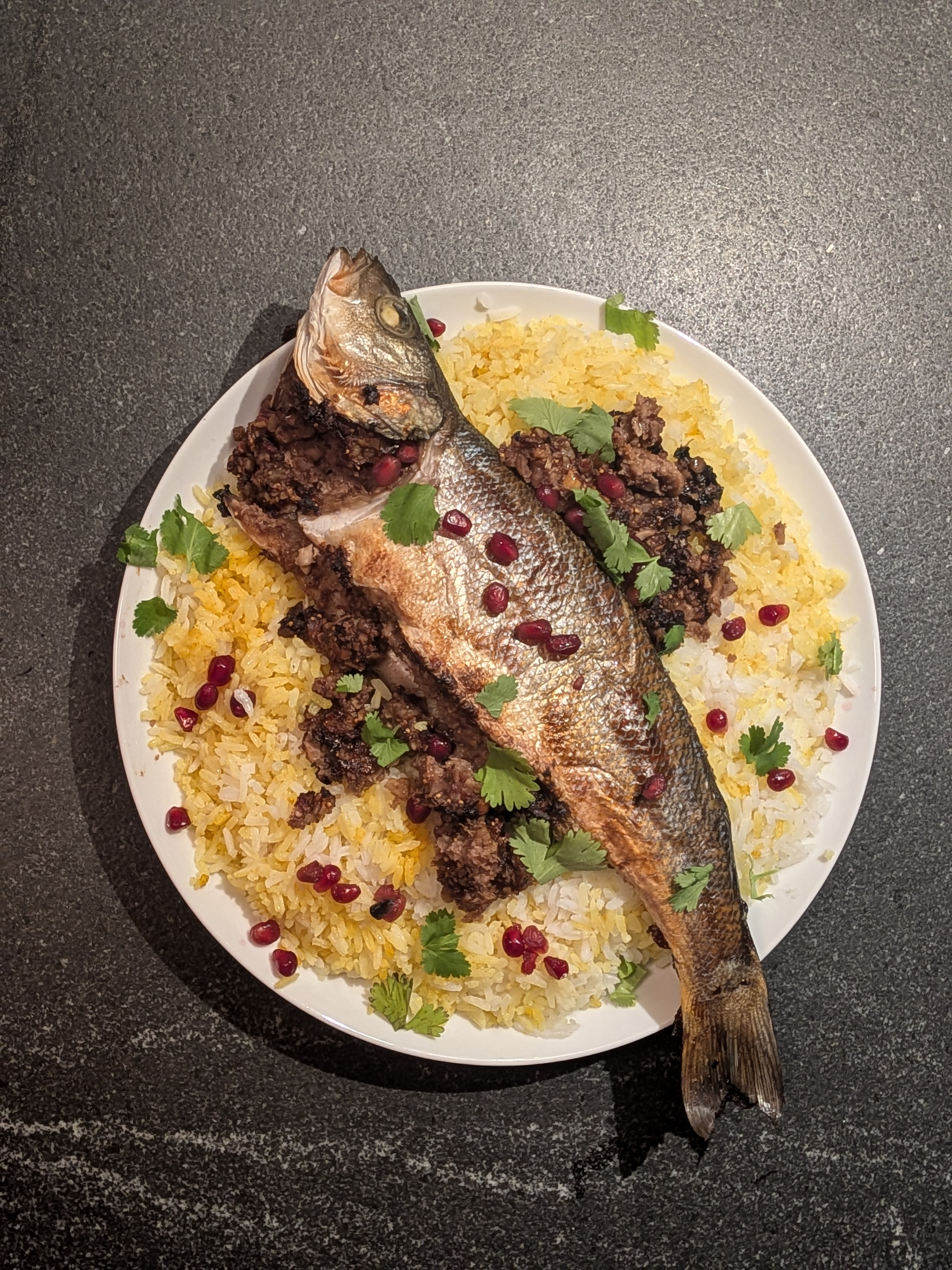
Fish levengi atop bed of turmeric rice, topped with pomegranate seeds and cilantro

The ingredients for stuffing include peeled walnuts, which can be finely chopped or passed through a meat grinder; onions, either chopped or grated and then drained of moisture through a sieve or cheesecloth; aloo bukhara (dried sour prunes) or sour cherry; and aloocheh (sour plum) paste or a pomegranate syrup called narsharab. It may optionally include raisins, other dried fruits such as figs, and vegetable oil. The ingredients can be mixed together with water or as is and then seasoned with salt and ground black pepper to taste.

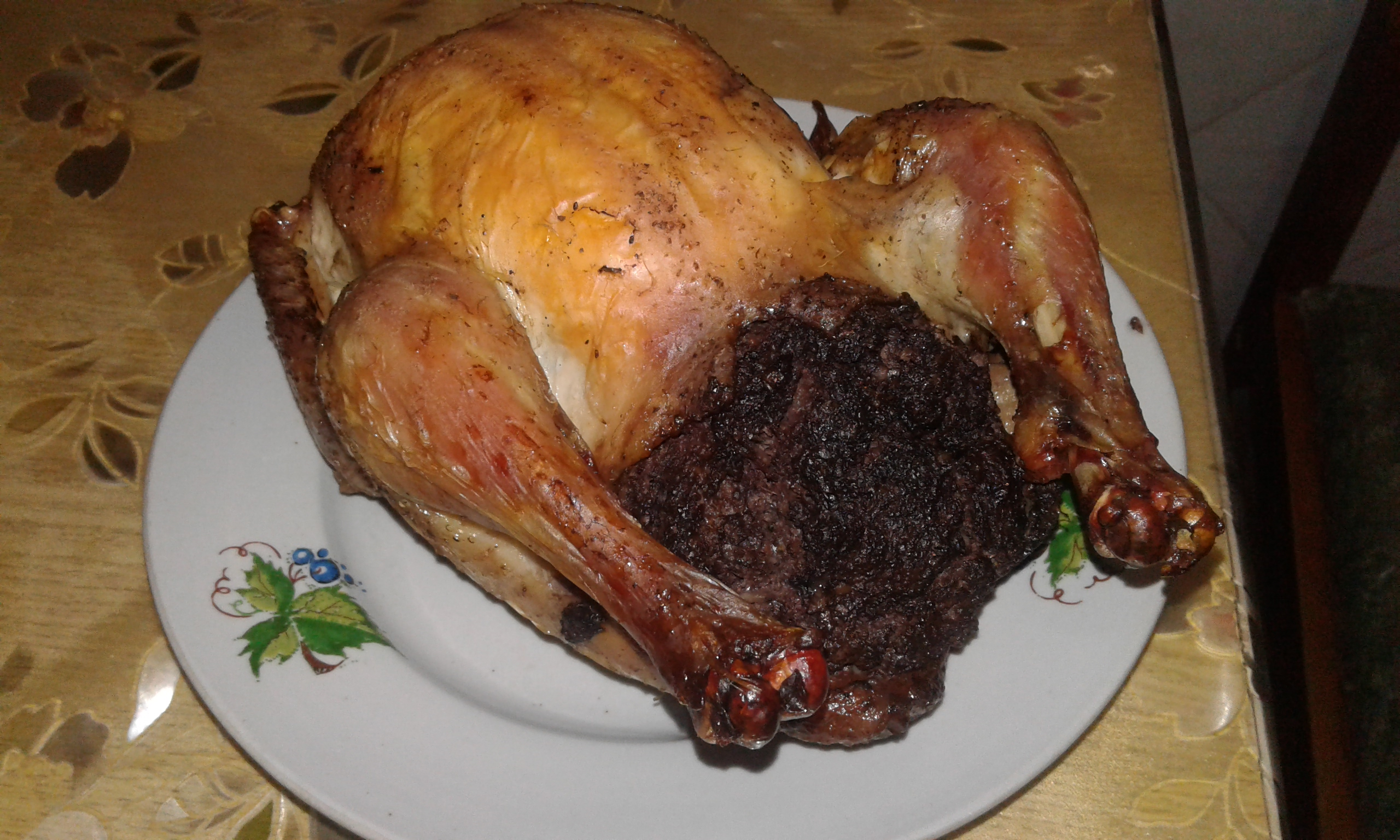
Chicken levengi served on its own

For fish dishes, the Caspian kutum, asp, or carp of the Caspian Sea are preferred, but white fish like the beluga sturgeon can also be suitable. The fish is first gutted, scaled, and washed. It may also optionally be skinned, removed of its head, or removed of its tail, but is often not. It is then rubbed with salt and pepper and filled with the stuffing after being dried out. For poultry dishes, the meat is rubbed with salt and pepper. For both kinds of dishes, the meat is then sewn with kitchen twine or skewered shut in order to contain the stuffing. The meat is then either rubbed with narsharab, cherry-plum sauce, or lemon juice. The meat is baked in the oven until the top of it fries and becomes flaky. It is typically served on top of vegetables, rice, or pilaf, alongside pieces of lemon, bread and narsharab.

== See also ==
- List of stuffed dishes
