= Quesito =

Pastry from Puerto Rico

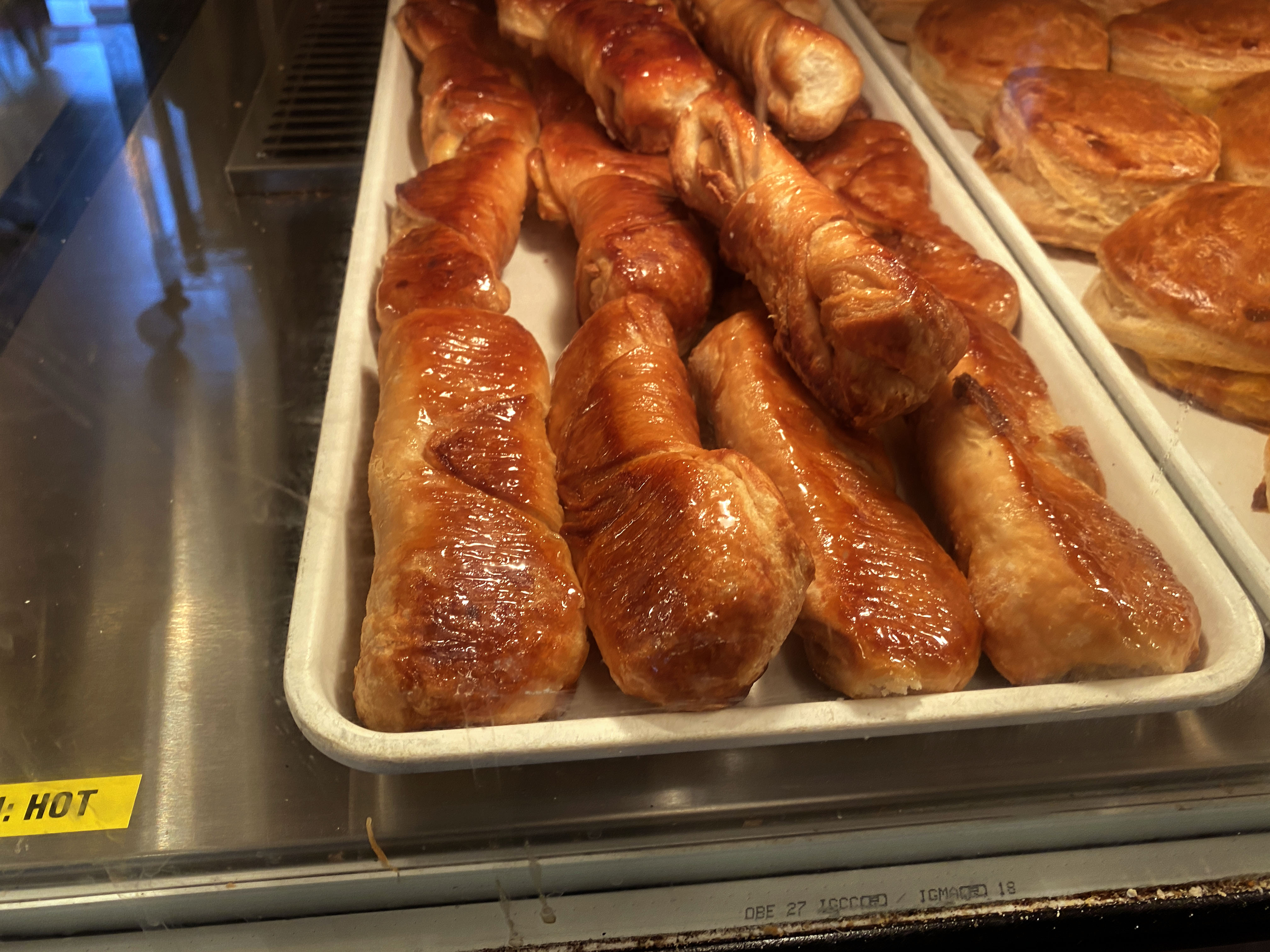
- Quesitos
- Type: Pastry
- Place of origin: Latin America, Caribbean and Puerto Rico
- Main ingredients: Puff pastry, cream cheese, vanilla, eggs, and sugar

Quesito is a cream cheese-filled pastry twist from Puerto Rico.

== Description ==
Quesito is one of the most popular pastries in Puerto Rico. The origin of this pastry is unclear but exact recipes are found all over Latin America and the Caribbean. Cream cheese is whipped with vanilla and sugar, guava paste or jam can be added and is a favorite in Latin America and Caribbean.

Although quesitos may not have originated in Puerto Rico, they do add interesting flavors that are hard to find outside the island.

The batter can contain eggs and sour cream similar to cheesecake. Red bean paste, piña colada, almond paste, dulce de leche, dulce de lechosa (spiced papaya jam), bacon, and other nuts and fruits. The mixture is stuffed into a puff pastry, coated in a sugary caramelized syrup, and baked. Quesitos are sold at bakeries and "bomboneras" (literally "chocolate box" or "candy box", a word also used to refer to sweet shops selling this type of item).

== See also ==
- Doughnut
- Fried dough
- List of pastries
- List of stuffed dishes
- Mozzarella sticks
- Puerto Rican cuisine
