= Stuffed cucumber =

Ingredient and dish

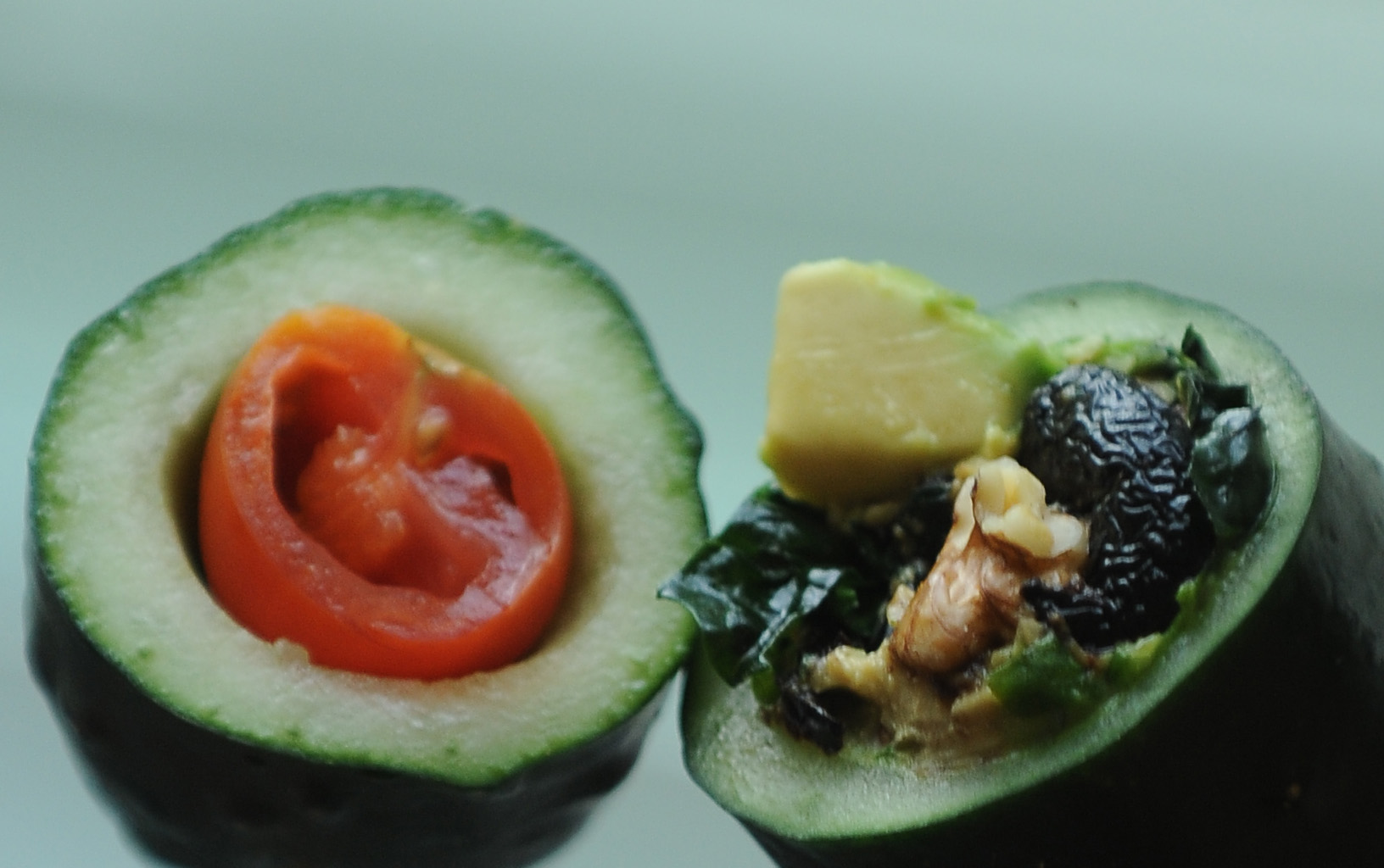
A stuffed cucumber

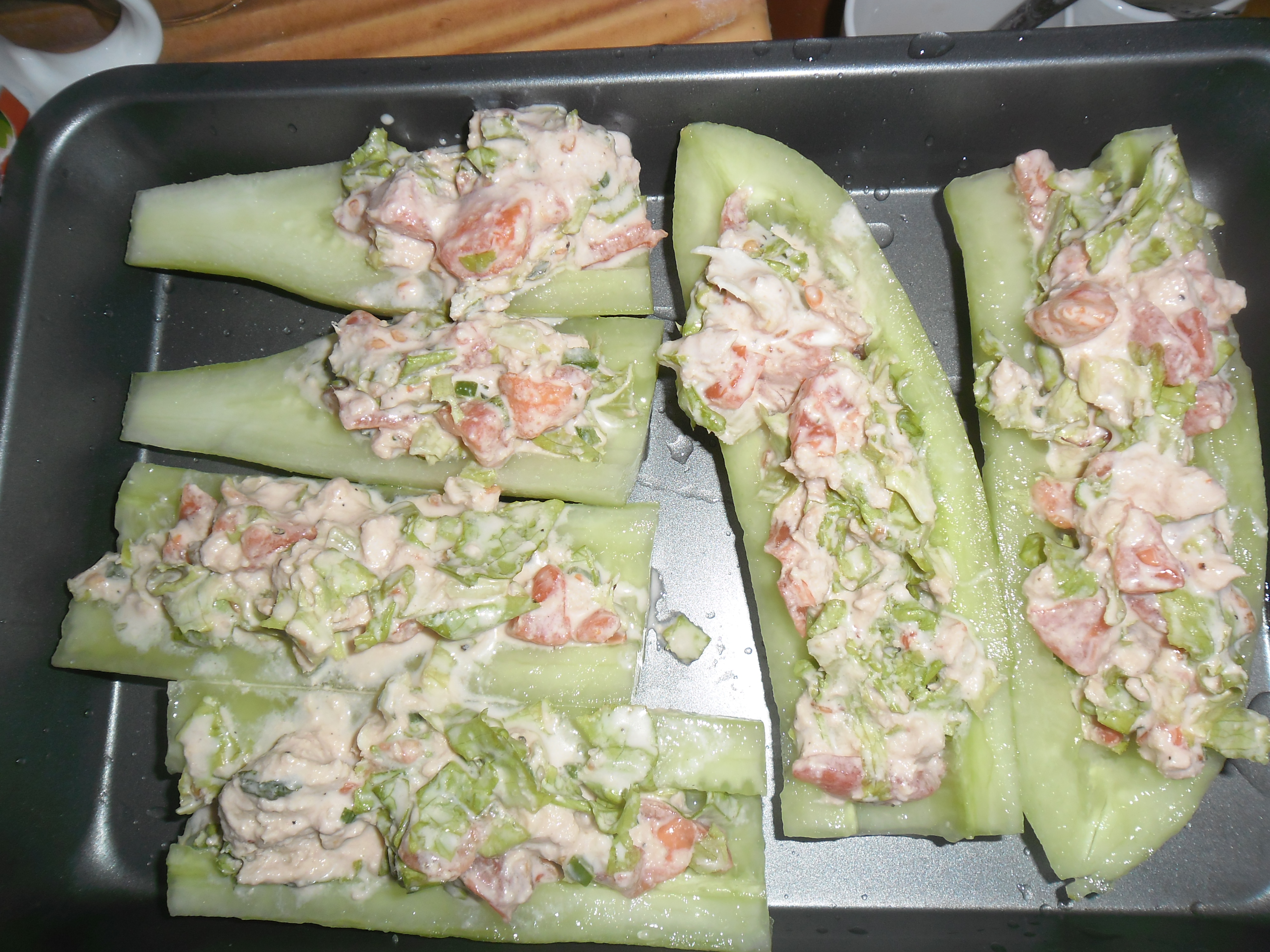
Example of Cucumber farcis in French cuisine. There is also a cooked version. Cucumbers stuffed with a mix of tuna, crème fraîche, tomatoes, salt, pepper, chives

The stuffed cucumber is an ingredient found in various cuisines around the world. Some stuffed cucumber dishes, such as Korean oi sobaegi, incorporate preserved cucumbers, whereas others, such as American recipes, use fresh cucumbers. The ingredients used to actually stuff the cucumber vary widely from cuisine to cuisine. Some examples of versions of stuffed cucumber exist in French, American, Korean, and Turkish cuisine.

Many different dishes incorporating stuffed cucumber exist. In Korean cuisine, oi sobaegi is a kimchi made from stuffed cucumber filled with onions, shrimp, ginger, garlic and chili. In Nevşehir, Turkey, ripe cucumbers are dried in the sun, then stuffed with bulghur seasoned with dill, mint, tomato paste and onion.

American cookbooks from the early 20th century described many different fillings for stuffed cucumber, including French dressing, mayonnaise, tomatoes, walnuts, celery, onions, and lobster. After being hollowed out with a specialized tool, the filling is piped into the cucumber. Some versions and breaded and fried before being served whole, or sliced to serve as a garnish for another dish. While some are stuffed with Greek yogurt/ hung curd and served as a summer salad/starter. Others are stewed or baked in gravy. At state fairs in the United States in the 2010s, stuffed cucumbers were marketed as a "healthier alternative" to deep fried or chocolate covered fair food.

Cucumber farcis is the french dish, in English, literally stuffed cucumber, often with a creamy spread sometimes with ground meat, and then cooked or served in split and hollowed raw cucumber.

== See also ==
- List of stuffed dishes
