= Stuffed quinces =

Quinces stuffed with meat, rice and more

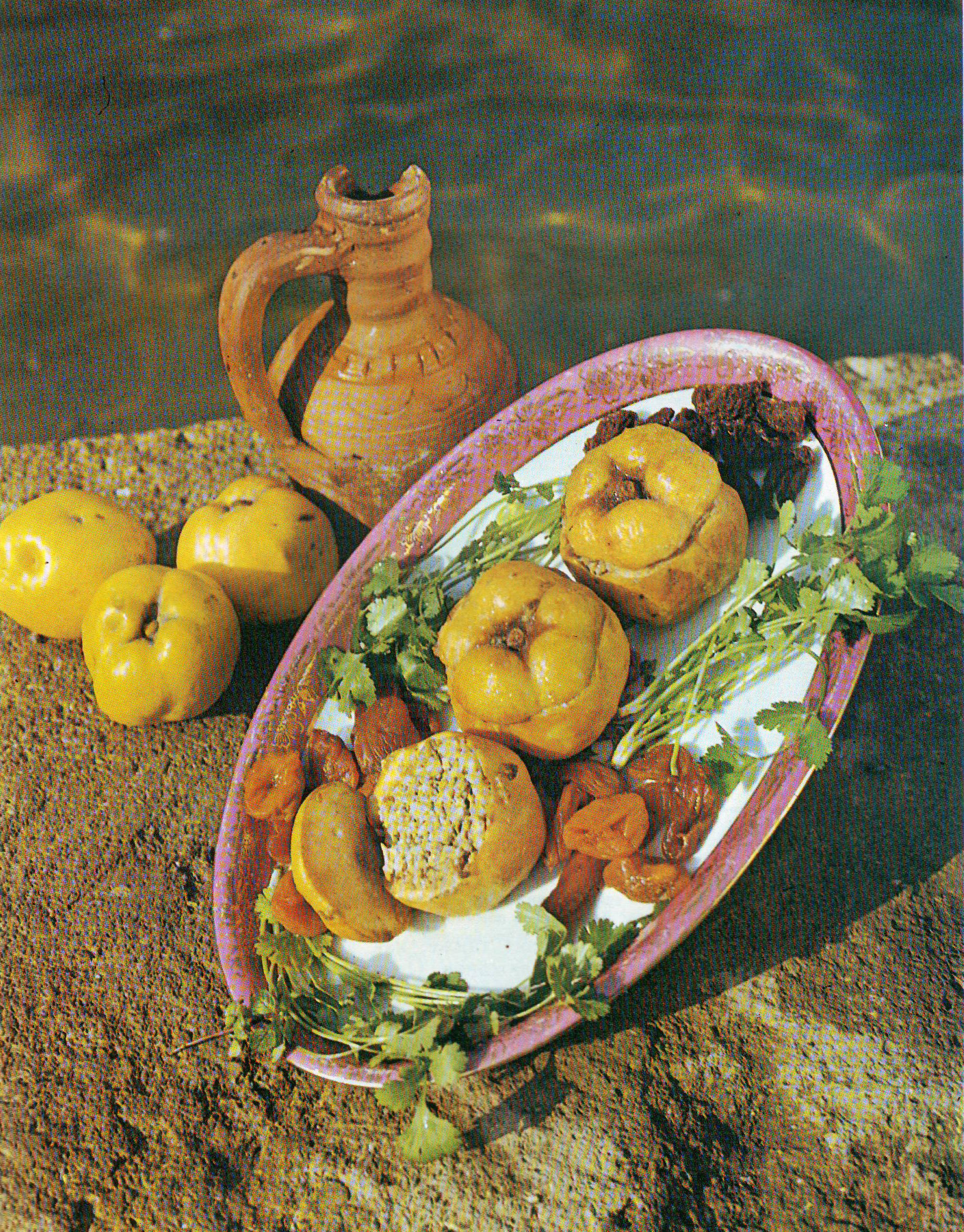
- Region or state: Armenia, Azerbaijan, Iran, Turkey
- Serving temperature: Hot

Stuffed quinces (Armenian: լցոնած սերկևիլ, Azerbaijani: Heyva dolması, Persian: دلمه به, Turkish: Ayva dolması) are made of quinces stuffed with minced meat, rice, currants, cinnamon, coriander, grape syrup and salt.

Armenian stuffed quinces specifically are made with quince, minced meat or cubed meat, onion, rice, pine nuts or walnuts, raisins, apricots, cinnamon, grape syrup, allspice, cloves, pepper, salt and butter. This type of stuffed quinces is called Etchmiadzin Dolma.

Iranian stuffed quinces are made with quince, minced meat or cubed meat, almond, pistachio, barberry, butter, cardamom, coriander, tarragon, plum, onion, saffron, salt, pepper, turmeric and cinnamon.

== See also ==
- List of stuffed dishes
