= Plátanos rellenos =

Plátanos rellenos is a typical dish of Tabasco. It consists of plantain stuffed with meat and seasonings and fried.

== See also ==
- Alcapurria
- List of stuffed dishes
