= Sakhu sai mu =

Thai snack food

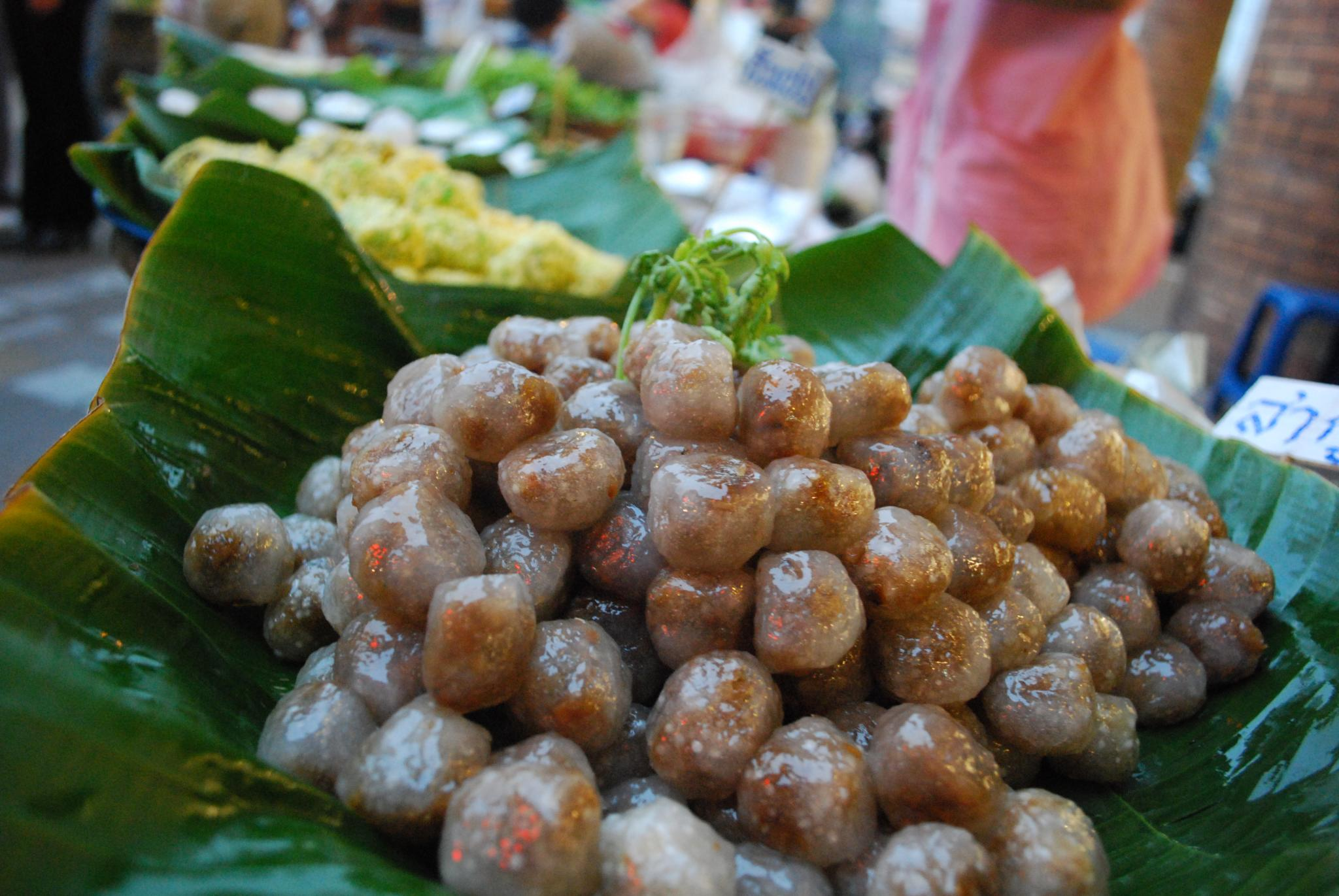
Sakhu sai mu

Sakhu sai mu (Thai: สาคูไส้หมู, pronounced [sǎː.kʰūː sâj mǔː], "tapioca balls with pork filling") is a Thai snack. Although it is traditionally made with sago starch (hence the name sakhu, which is Thai for sago), today tapioca is more commonly used as a substitute. It is a popular food in Thailand and found at street stalls and markets. Sakhu sai mu is a dumpling which consists of a flour ball with a pork filling. Most people in Thailand eat sakhu sai mu with khao kriap pak mo. The difference between sakhu sai mu and khao kriap pak mo is that sakhu sai mu is covered with flour batter like a dumpling while khao kriap pak mo is wrapped with flour batter. They have the same filling.

The ingredients of sakhu sai mu are tapioca flour, cilantro, finely chopped onion, lean pork finely chopped, brown sugar, Thai fish sauce, finely chopped fresh hot chilies and roasted peanuts.

== See also ==
- List of stuffed dishes
