= Stuffed tomatoes =

Tomato dish

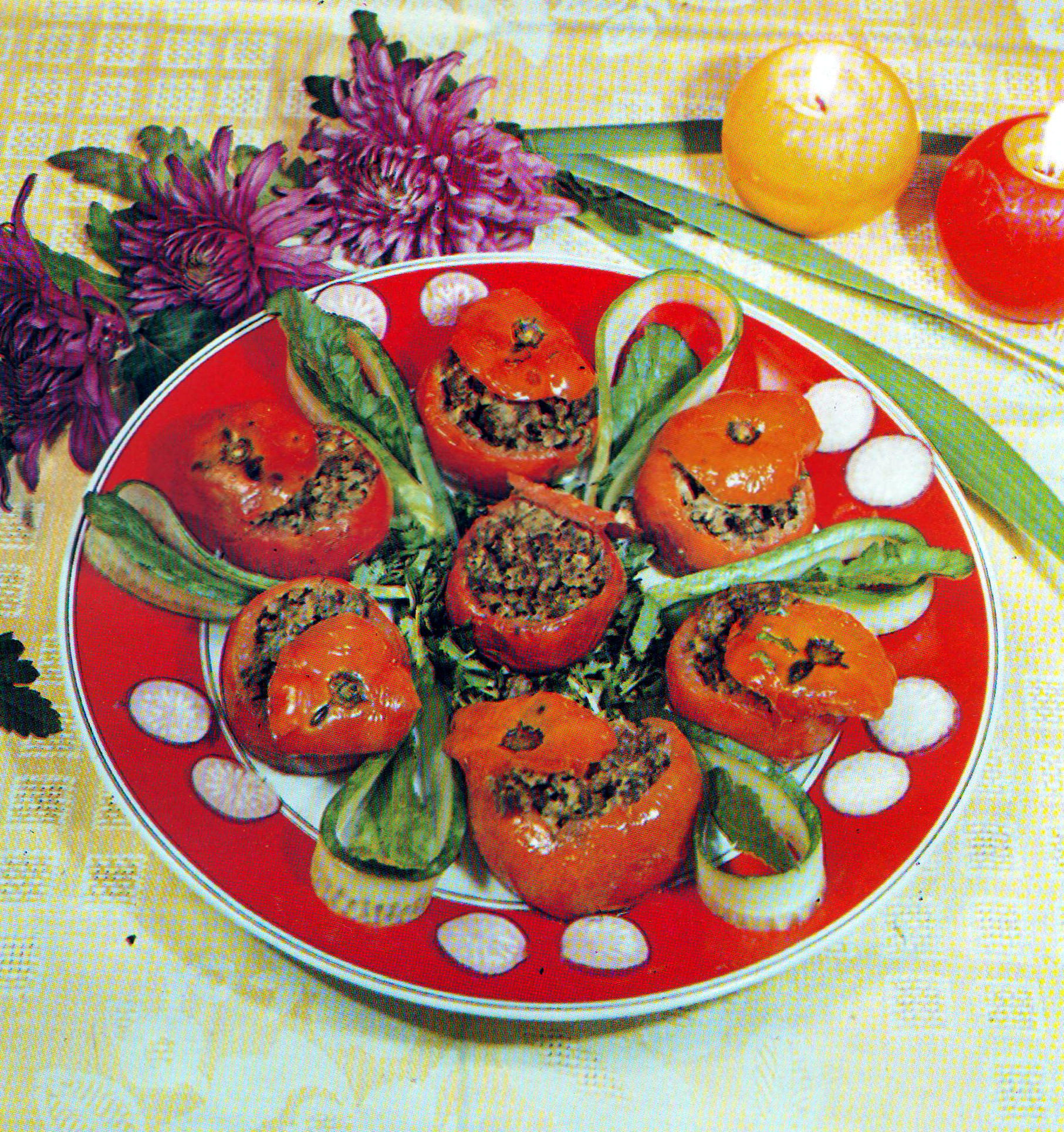
- Region or state: Turkey, Iran, Azerbaijan, Armenia, France, Italy, Greece, Argentina, Uruguay, Romania
- Serving temperature: Hot or room temperature

Stuffed tomatoes are one of a number of dishes in which tomatoes are filled with ingredients, usually including rice.

== Names ==
In various languages, the name of the dish literally means "stuffed tomatoes". Elsewhere the name specifies that the dish includes rice such as Italian: Pomodori al Riso.

== Preparation and ingredients ==
In most countries, the tomatoes are stuffed with meat (lamb) and rice; other ingredients are onion, parsley, olive oil, mint, black pepper, and salt. In the Roman dish, the filling is traditionally made with rice alone and it can additionally be flavored with cinnamon.

In Provence, France, it is common to prepare tomates farcies with minced meat, breadcrumbs and cheese. In Nice, the fruits are initially emptied and subsequently flavored with a filling of onion, garlic, aubergine, pepper, tomato paste and marjoram.

== See also ==
- List of stuffed dishes
