= Krautshäuptchen =

Cabbage dish from northern Hesse, Germany

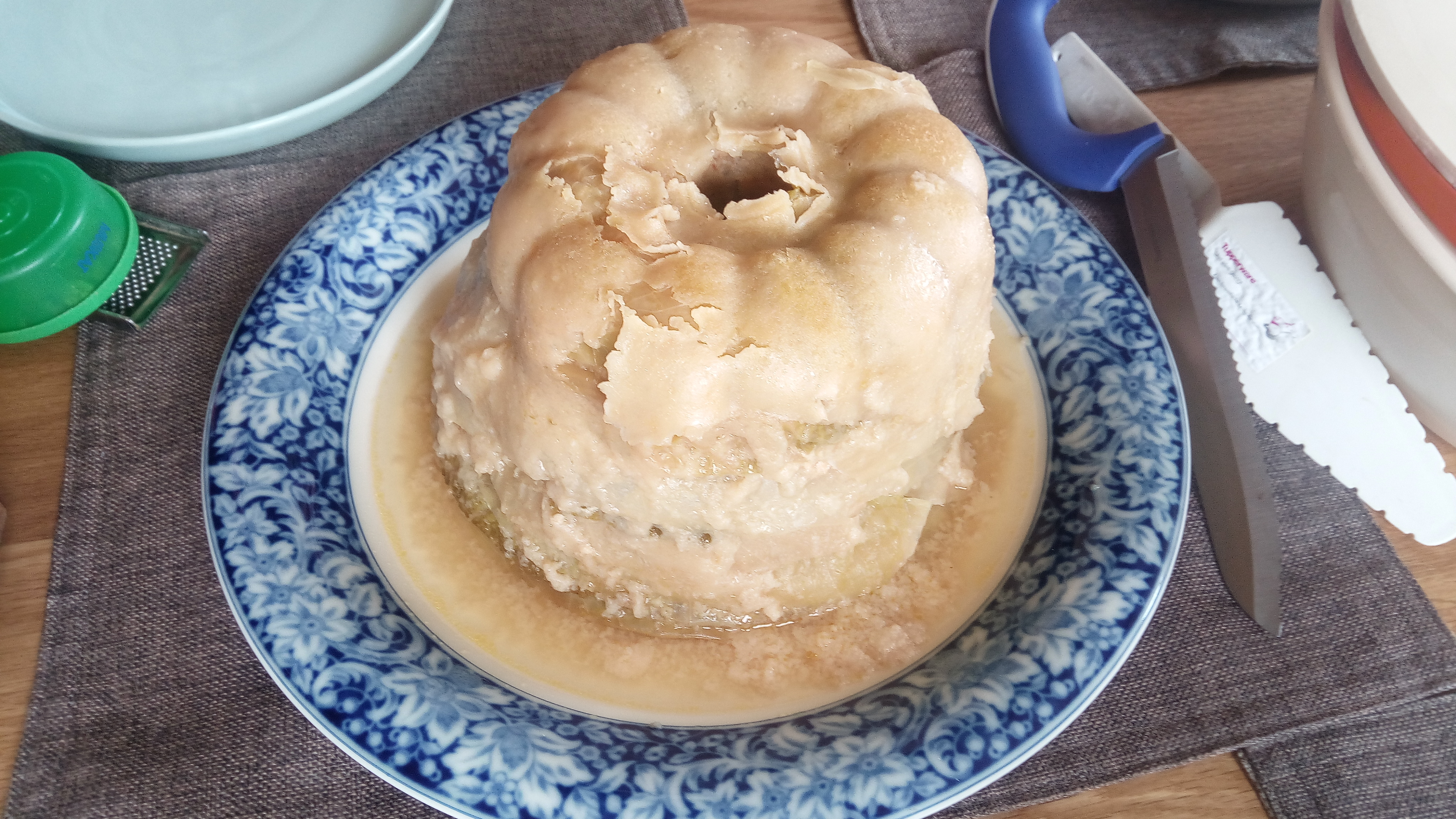
Krautshäuptchen

Krautshäuptchen, also Krautshäubchen is a stuffed cabbage, a specialty of northern Hesse, Germany. It is served with boiled potatoes and mustard sauce or bechamel sauce. Often the Krautshäuptchen discs are fried until golden brown before serving in the pan.

== See also ==
- List of stuffed dishes
