= Stuffed mussels =

Stuffed dish

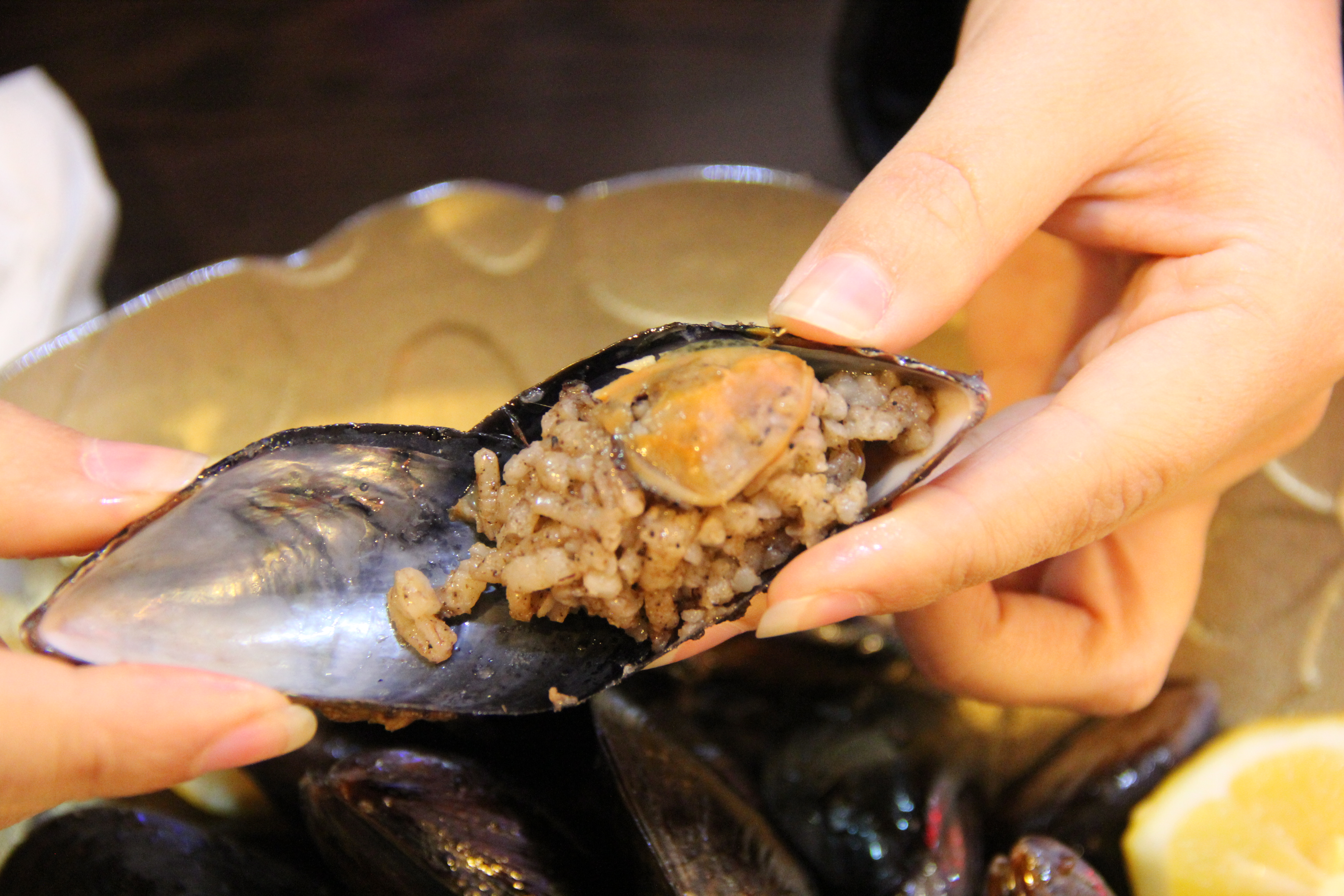
- Region or state: Turkey, Armenia
- Created by: Armenians in the Ottoman Empire

Stuffed mussels (Turkish: Midye dolma; Armenian: Լցոնած միդիա, or Միդիա տոլմա), or midye, is a generic name for plump orange mussels that contain herbed and spiced rice. Midye dolma is a popular and common street food snack in the coastal cities of Turkey and in Armenia.

== History ==
The historical preparation of midye dolma is generally attributed to Armenians in the Ottoman Empire. According to TH. Maggakis' 1888 work Bizans Salnamesi Armenians had used big mussels and prepared the dish using sheep's tail fat or "zibir yağı", a solid fat imported from Siberia. Balıkhane Nazırı Ali Rıza Bey (1842–1928) also notes that in Bahariye, Kadıköy brickworks owner Şahbaz Efendi's Armenian cook was preparing stuffed mussels. During the 19th century it was reported that İstanbulite Turkish women were also cooking stuffed mussels.

In the 1960s, the preparation and sale of stuffed mussels came to be dominated by immigrants from Mardin, who had at the time recently immigrated to İstanbul's Galata district. In the following decades they have kept the market share and today, most of the food carts are still being operated by people from Mardin. It was noted that there are flavor differences between Armenian-style and Mardin-style stuffed mussels, the latter being more spicy.

== Preparation ==
Mytilus galloprovincialis is the most commonly used mussel for midye dolma. First the shells are cleaned, removing any irregularities from the outside of the shell. The mussels are then placed in hot water; this allows the shells to separate. A mixture of rice, oil, salt and different spices is added to the shells along with the meat in the mussels. The spices used vary by region. Common spices used include red pepper, currants and black pepper. The shells are closed before cooking. Midye dolma typically cooks for 15 to 30 minutes on boiling heat. Once the mussels are done cooking, vendors typically let them cool for 10 minutes before serving.

== Variations ==
Midye dolma is traditionally eaten with just lemon juice squeezed over them right before consumption. The lemon juice is used for flavor and to prevent the rice from becoming dry. Some places add different spices and sauces. One variation adds dried tamarind to the outside of the mussel shell. A different variation colors the mussels with squid ink to add additional flavor. Other establishments add rice made with sautéed white onions along with the meat in the mussels.

== Vendors ==
Street vendors with small carts are common midye dolma sellers in Turkey. Midye dolma street vendors are not common all over Turkey. Most street vendors are found in Turkey's coastal cities including Istanbul, İzmir and Bodrum. There are two specific locations in Istanbul which are known for their street food. Istikal Caddesi, an avenue in the European side of Istanbul and Eminönü a district near the Galata Bridge. Midye Dolma carts are frequently found in those two locations along with vendors of other Turkish street food. Unlike Istanbul, there is no one place that is known for street food in Izmir. Street food is popular throughout the city and midye dolma vendors are specifically found near the water. Vendors typically serve midye dolma late into the night. Street vendors typically sell midye dolma at a promotional price. In 2022, a commonly used price point is 10 dolmas for 10 liras.

== Restaurants ==
Aside from vendors, stuffed mussels are also found in restaurants. Both casual and high end restaurants serve midye dolmas. It is common for midye dolmas to be served in small establishments alongside kokoretsi, another common street food. These establishments usually have limited seating options and do not have table cloths or silverware. The process is similar to ordering at a vendor. One typically goes to the cashier themselves and also brings their food back themselves. Midye dolmas are typically served as a meze, in high end restaurants. These restaurants are typically seafood restaurants and midye dolmas are followed by a fish course.

== Contamination and pollution ==
In a 2020 study that examined the presence of microplastics (MP) in stuffed mussels sold in 5 Turkish cities, it has been reported that 100 grams of stuffed mussels on average contained around 5.8 MP pieces. The study also concluded that İstanbul had the highest MP quantity per mussel.

A study from 2011 reported that approximately 50% of samples of street-bought mussels from Ankara were not suitable for consumption in accordance with Turkish Food Codex due to the Salmonella sp. content. The study also found out that 30% of the samples were contaminated with E. coli, 80% with B. cereus, 76.6% with S. aureus and 13.3% with Clostridium perfringens and were not suitable for consumption. Another study from 2007 showed that both lemon juice and lemon dressing use caused a slight decrease in Salmonella typhimurium as an immediate inhibitor, and this effect increased by time.

In another study published in December 2021, the metal/metalloid levels in stuffed mussels were analyzed. The results showed that the levels of Cr, As, and Cd found in stuffed mussels posed a carcinogenic risk for almost all locations and consumer groups, while it was found that Pb did not pose any carcinogenic risk.

== See also ==
- List of stuffed dishes
