= List of stuffed dishes =

Foods prepared with fillings and stuffings

This is a list of stuffed dishes, comprising dishes and foods that are prepared with various fillings and stuffings. Some dishes are not actually stuffed; the added ingredients are simply spread atop the base food, as one cannot truly stuff an oyster or a mussel or a pizza.

== General stuffed dishes ==
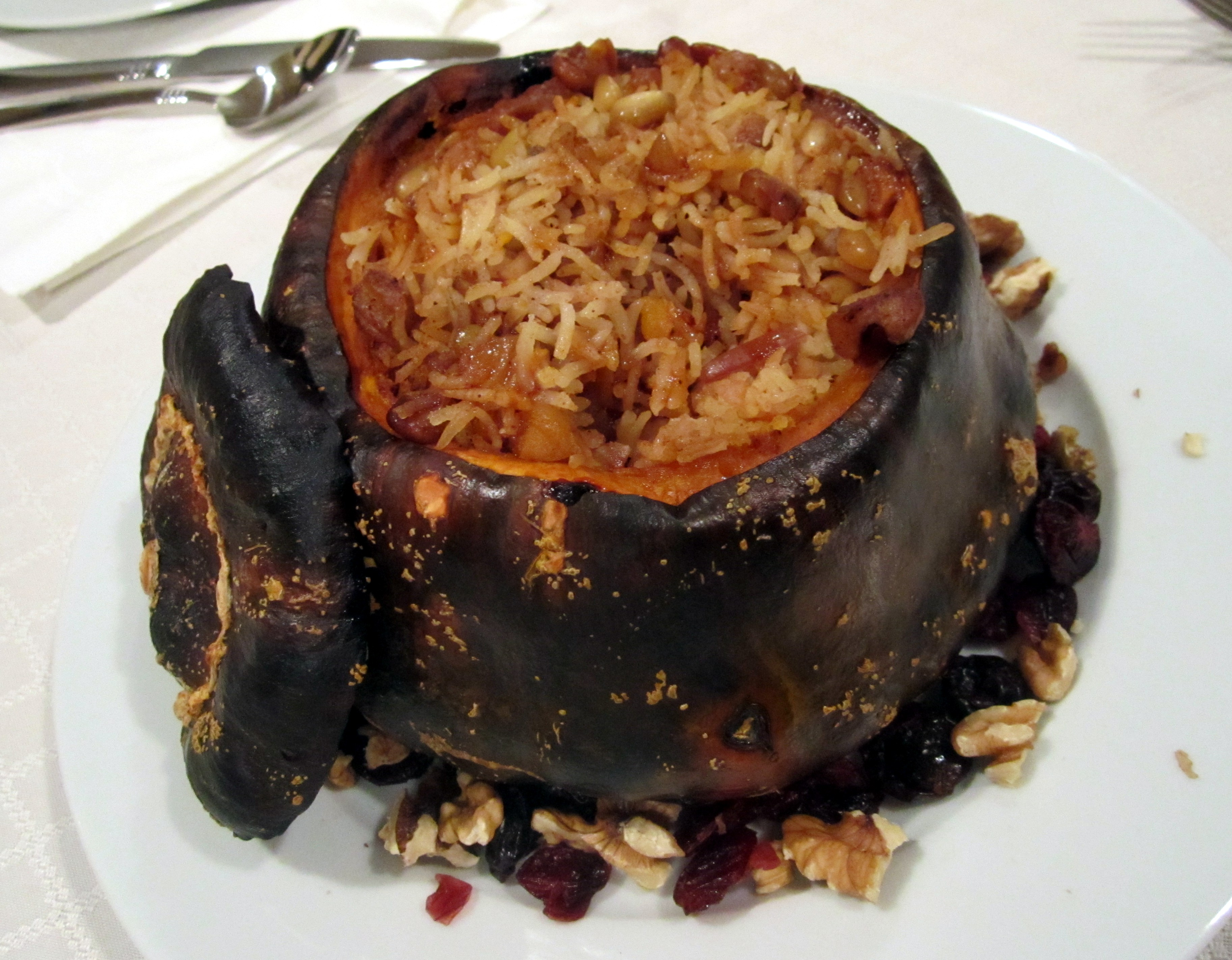
Ghapama

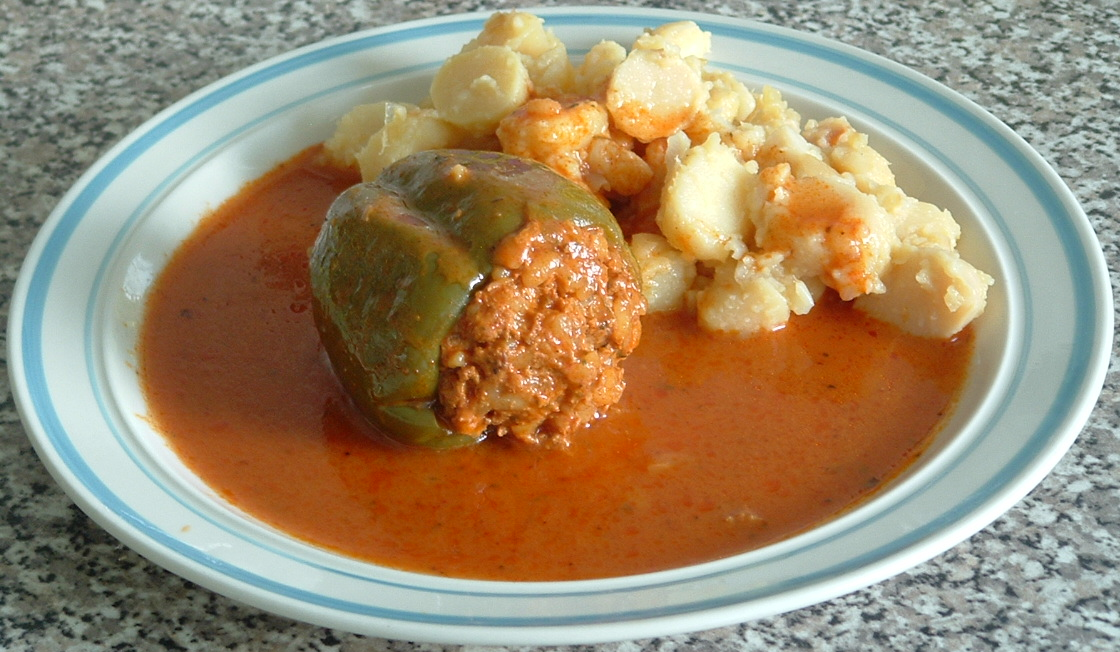
Punjena paprika, a stuffed pepper dish

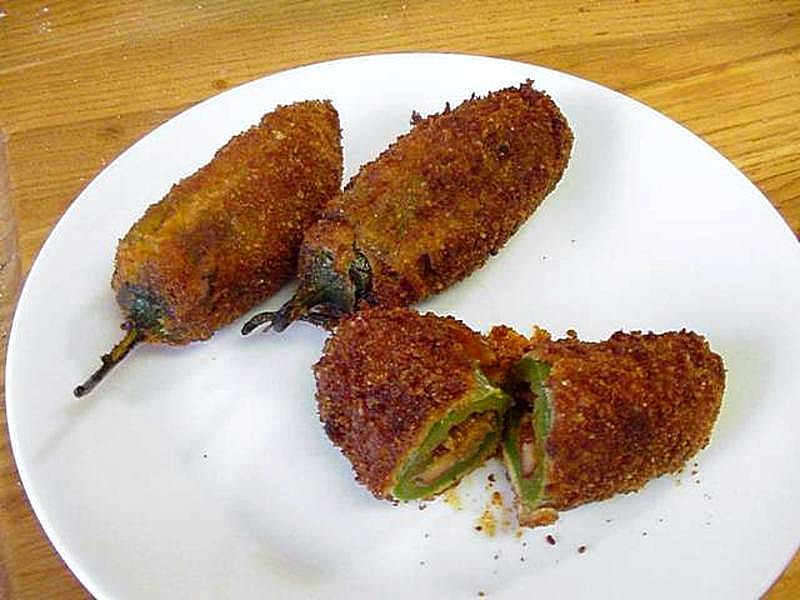
Jalapeño poppers

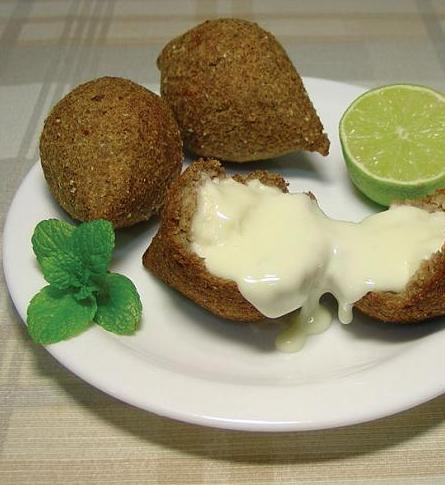
Brazilian kibbeh stuffed with requeijão

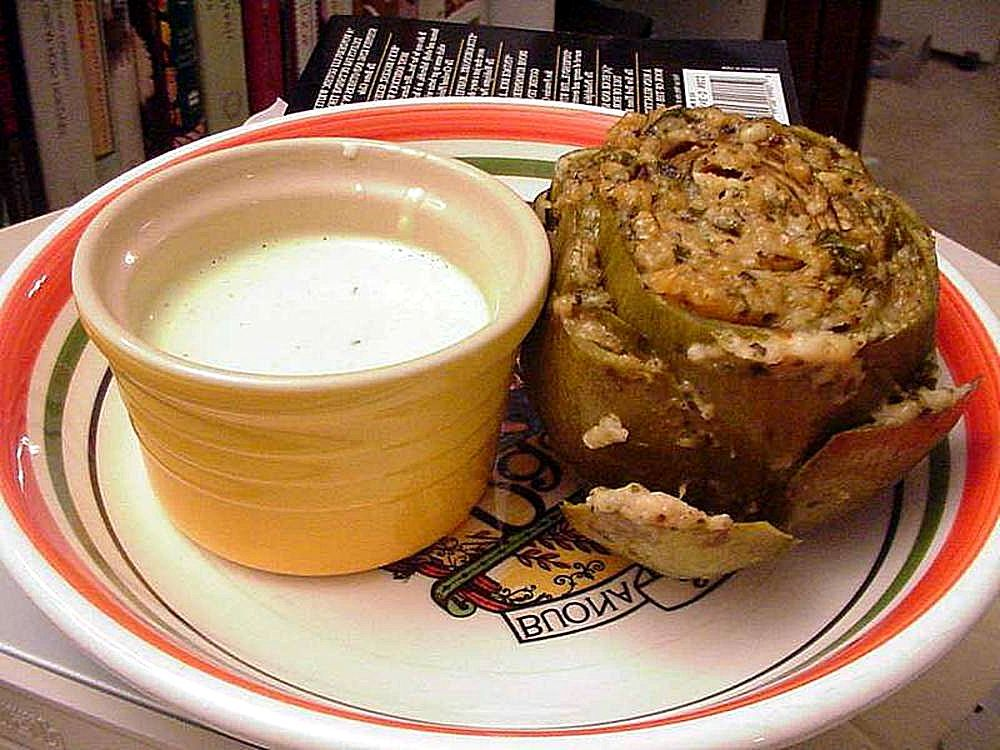
A stuffed artichoke served with a sauce

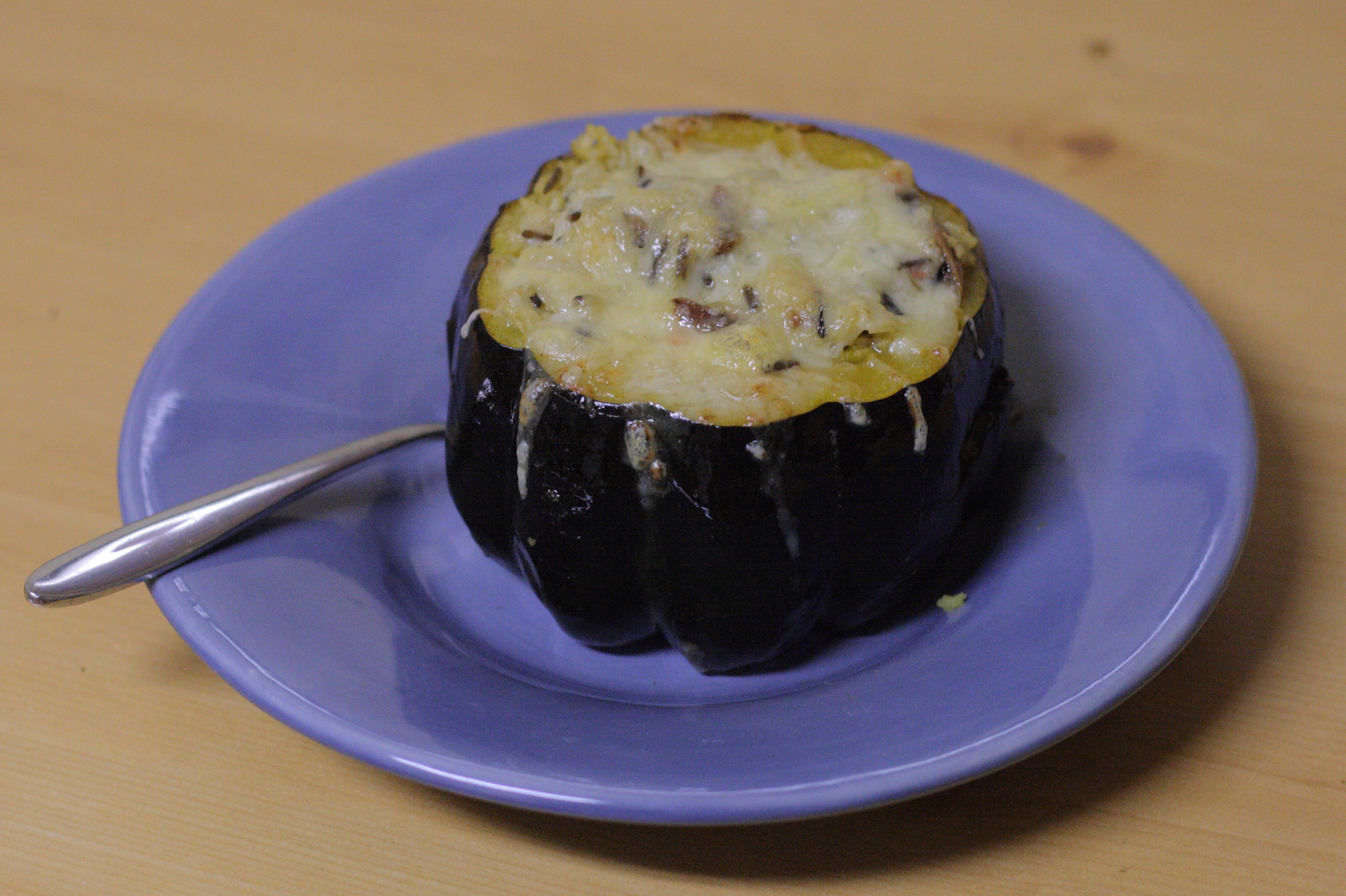
Stuffed squash: an acorn squash stuffed with pilaf and topped with cheese

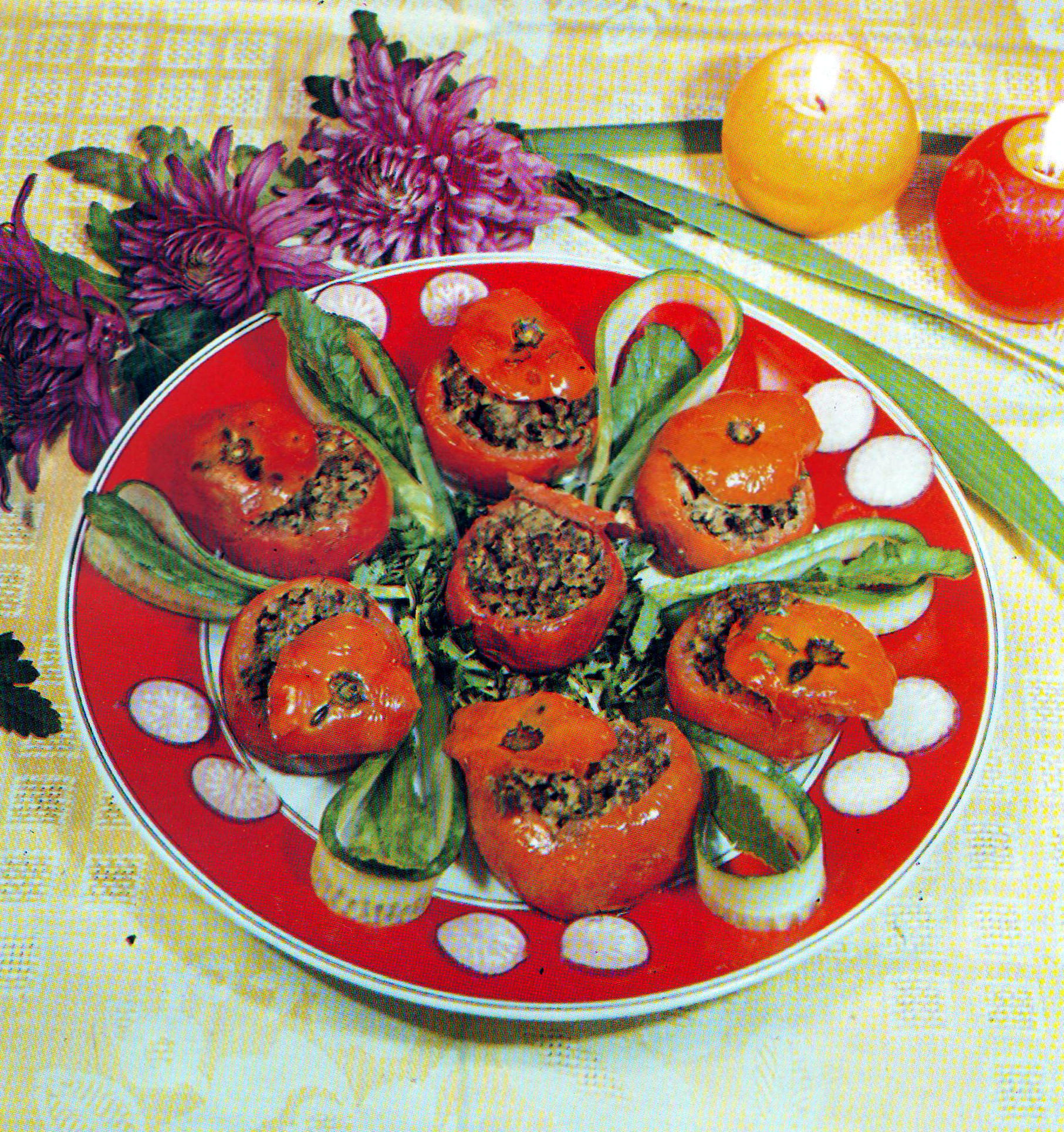
Stuffed tomatoes

- A-gei
- Chả giò
- Chatti pathiri
- Chaudin – a meat dish from southern Louisiana; it is a sausage-like variant made from ingredients such as spices, pork, rice and vegetables that are sewn up in a pig's stomach, which is then cooked. The dish is sometimes smoked.
- Chicken Kiev
- Chiles en nogada
- Cordon bleu
- Deviled egg an English dish stuffed with various spices
- Dolma – a family of stuffed vegetable dishes common in the Middle East and surrounding regions including the Balkans, the Caucasus, Russia and Central Asia. Common vegetables to stuff include tomato, pepper, onion, zucchini, eggplant, and garlic. Dolmas may also be wrapped in e.g. grape or cabbage leaves (and thus not strictly stuffed). The stuffing may or may not include meat.
- Dorma – a variant of dolma popular in West Bengal and Bangladesh, in which potol is stuffed with fish.
- Drob
- Eggah
- Empanada
- Figolla
- Galantine
- Ghapama – a filled pumpkin dish from Armenia made by hollowing out and stuffing a pumpkin with rice, dried fruits, meat, spices and more, there are multiple variations and this dish is often called the national dish of Armenian cuisine.
- Gołąbki
- Gordita
- Guanime
- Gyeran-mari
- Haggis
- Hallaca
- Helzel
- Hotteok
- İmam bayıldı
- Jalangkote
- Jalapeño popper
- Jamaican patty
- Kab yob (Hmong term for the dish known in English as egg roll)
- Kachori
- Kalitsounia
- Karađorđeva šnicla
- Karnıyarık
- Khai yat sai
- Kibbeh
- Kibinai
- Knish
- Kousa mahshi
- Krautshäuptchen
- Ladera – sometimes stuffed
- Lechona
- Lemper
- Llapingacho
- Manok pansoh
- À la Maréchale
- Mirchi bada
- Mücver
- Murtabak
- Nacatamal
- Onigiri
- Papa rellena
- Paste
- Pastel
- Pasteles
- Pasztecik szczeciński
- Pirozhki
- Plátanos rellenos – a typical dish of the Veracruz coast, consisting of plantain stuffed with meat and seasonings and fried.
- Pocket sandwich
- Porchetta
- Pupusa de arroz
- Qistibi
- Quesito
- Rellenong talong
- Rissole
- Rouladen
- Sajji
- Sakhu sai mu
- Samgye-tang
- Stuffed leaves

== Asian-style buns ==
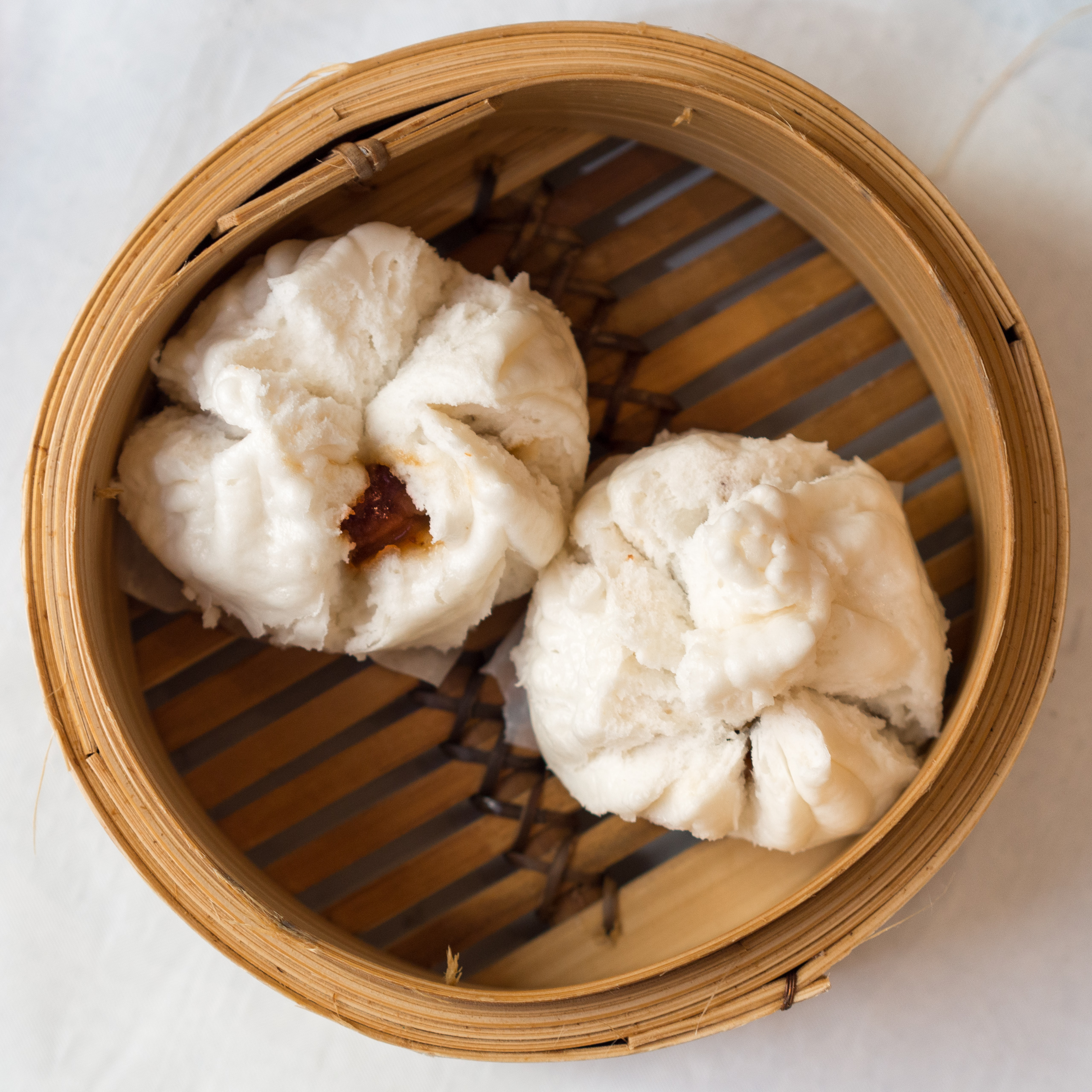
Cha siu bao

- Bánh bao
- Baozi
  - List of baozi
- Bakpia pathok
- Beef bun
- Buttered pineapple bun
- Cha siu bao
- Cocktail bun
- Jjinppang – a steamed bun, typically filled with red bean paste with bits of broken beans and bean husk.
  - Hoppang
- Nikuman
- Peanut butter bun
- Xab momo
- Xiaolongbao

== Desserts and sweets ==
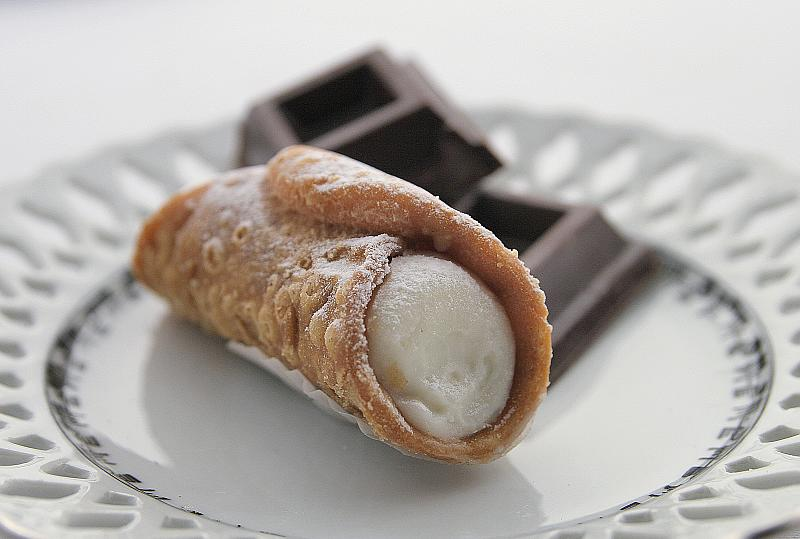
A cannolo

- Banana boat
- Cornulețe
- Cream bun
- Cuccidati
- Croissant
- Éclair
- Egg in the basket
- Jelly doughnut
- Khanom sot sai
- Klepon
- Manjū
- Milk-cream strudel
- Pampushka
- Poornalu
- Pootharekulu
- Puits d'amour
- Puran poli
- Stuffed racuchy
- Rellenitos de plátano
- Scovardă
- Şöbiyet
- Swiss roll
- Tortell
- Turon
- Unnakai

== Dumplings ==
- Pierogi

== Fish and seafood dishes ==
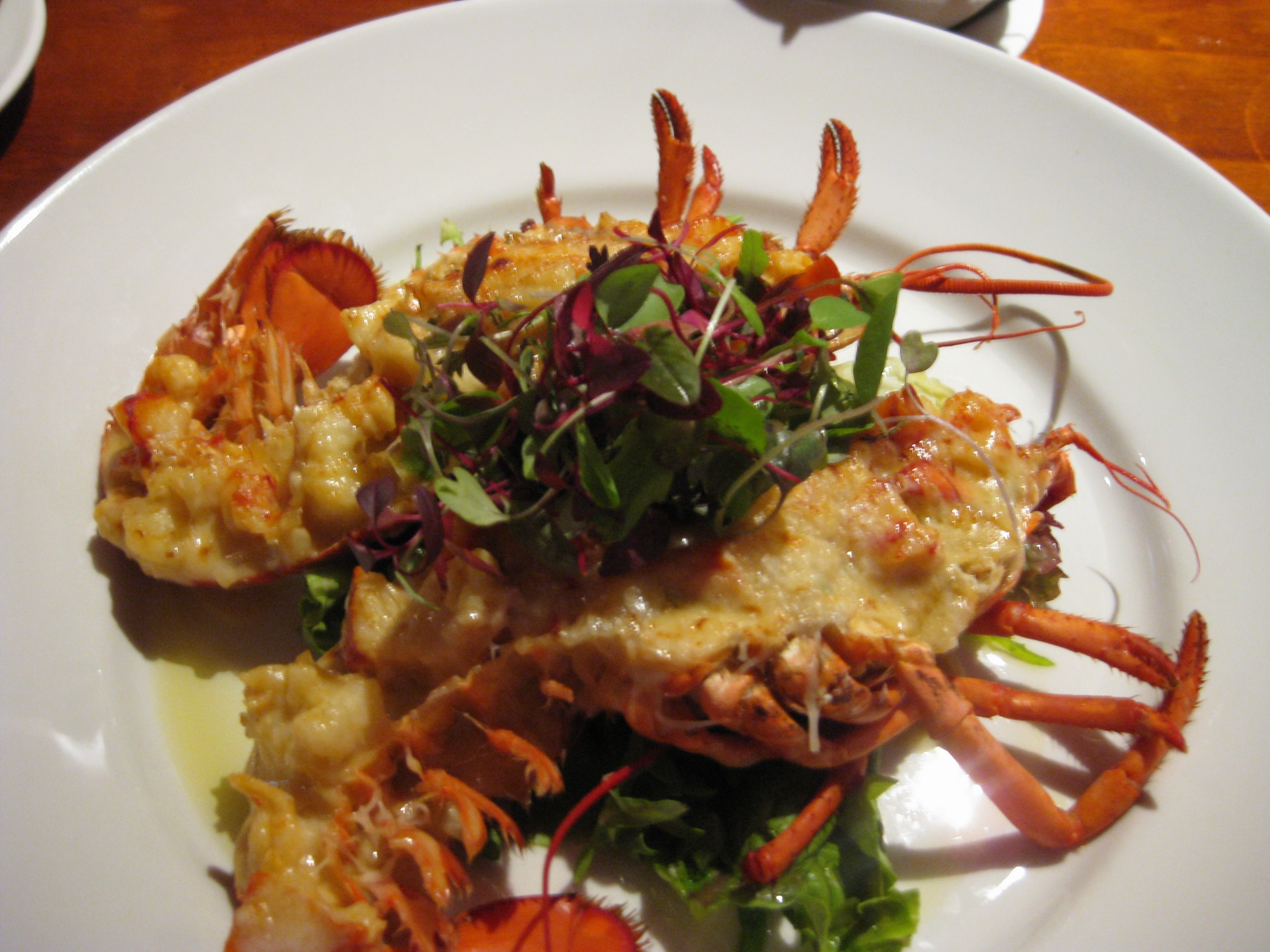
Lobster Thermidor

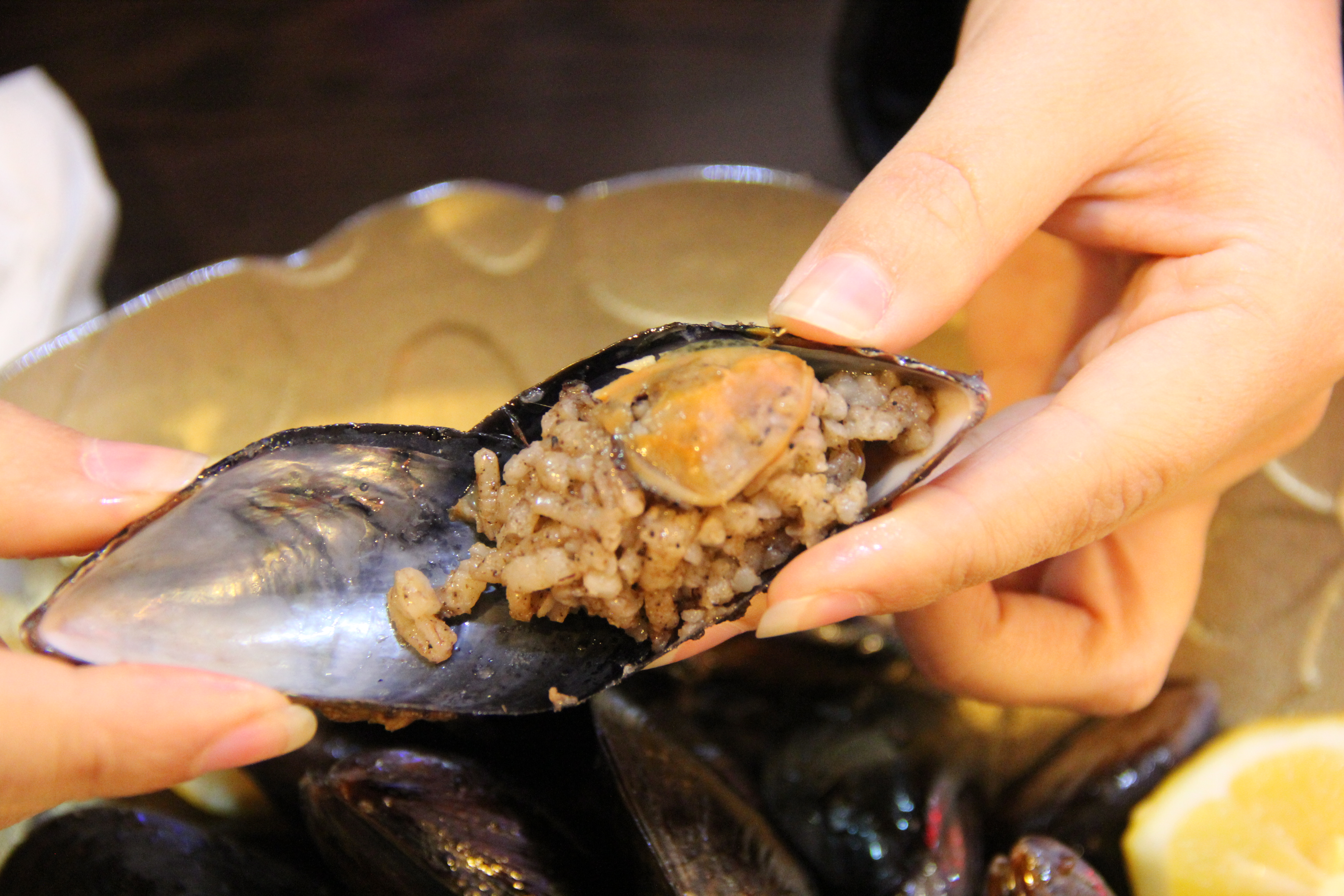
Stuffed mussels

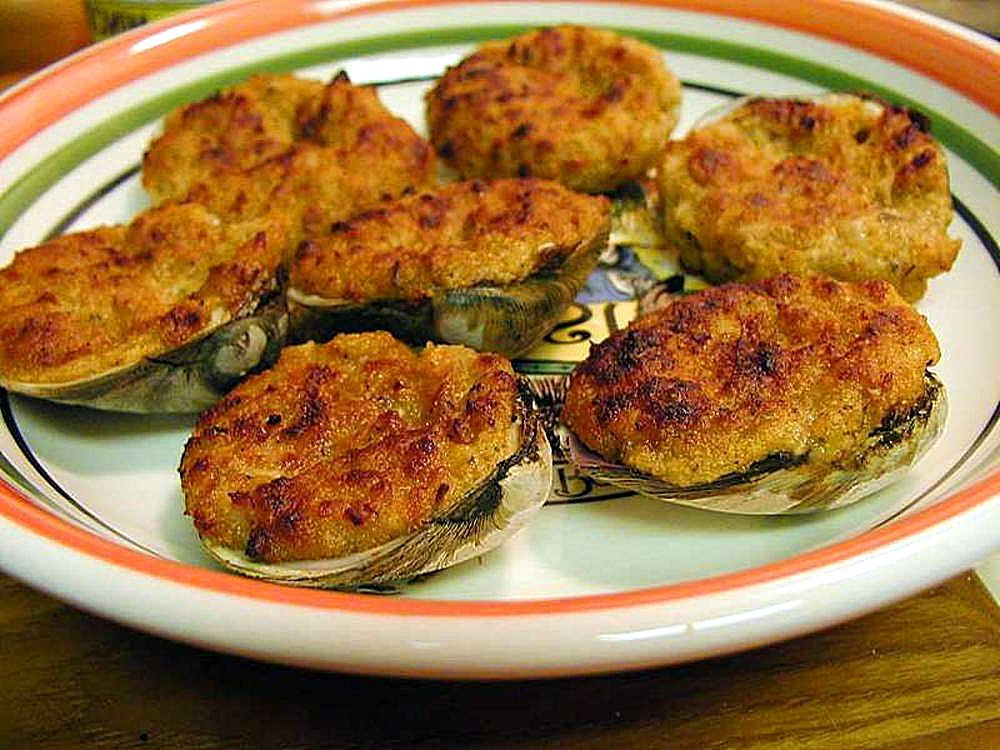
Stuffed clams

- Crappit heid – a traditional Scots fish course, consisting of a boiled fish head stuffed with oats, suet and liver.
- Stuffed clam
- Stuffed mussels – an Armenian dish that is popular in Armenia and Turkey consisting of mussels filled with a mixture of rice, oil, salt and different spices.
- Lobster Thermidor
- Stuffed squid
- Lavangi – a Talysh and Azerbaijani food consisting of fish or chicken stuffed with walnuts, onions and various condiments and baked in the oven.

== Flatbreads ==
- Bolani
- Zhingyalov hats – Armenian flatbread filled with herbs and spices.
- Stuffed paratha – paratha is an unleavened flatbread that is sometimes stuffed with various ingredients.
  - Aloo paratha – unleavened dough stuffed with a spiced mixture of mashed potato.
  - Gobhi paratha – stuffed with flavored cauliflower and vegetables.

== Fried doughs and fritters ==
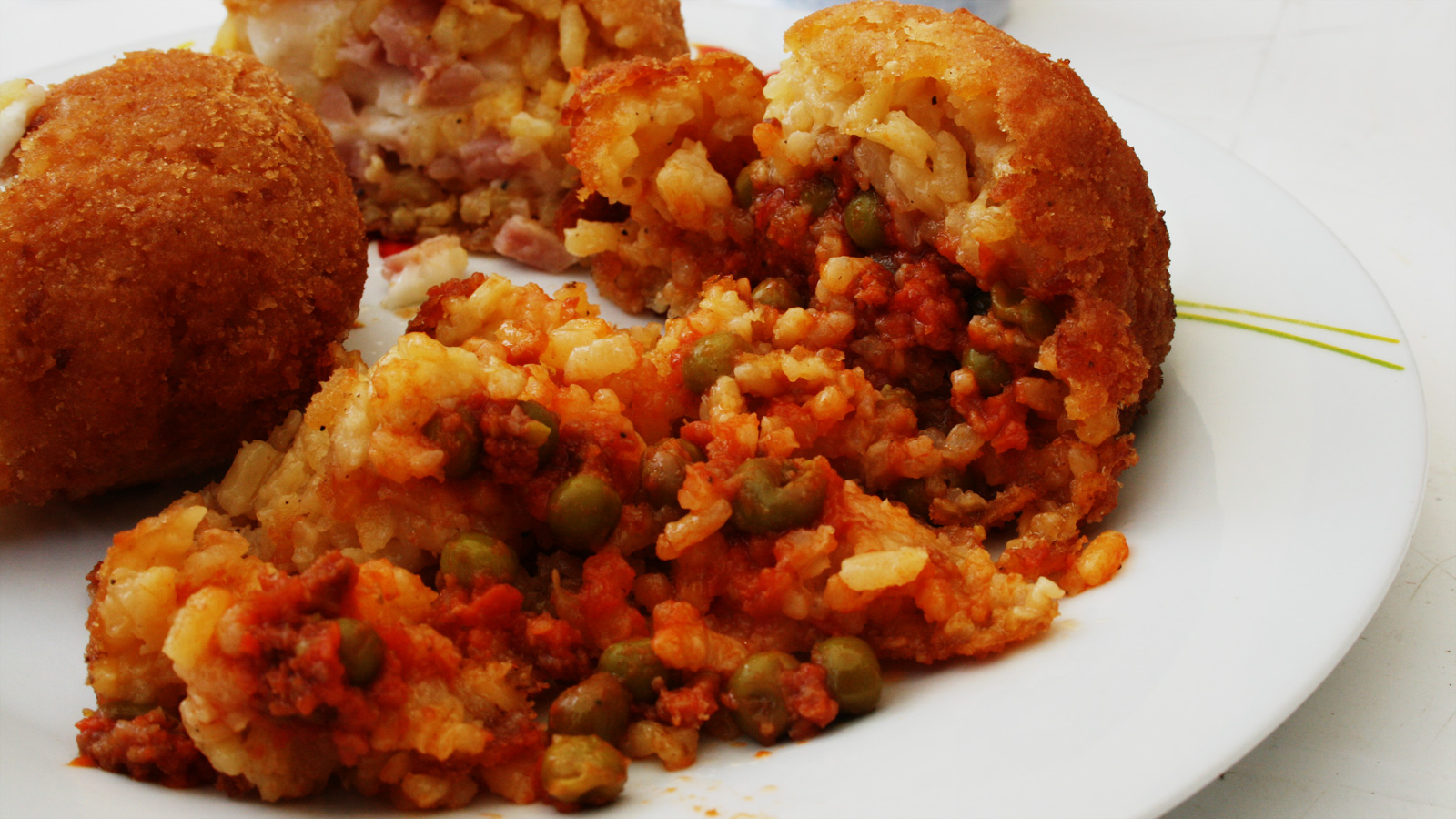
A split arancino, showing the rice and ragù stuffing

- Aloo pie
- Arancini
- Barbajuan
- Bichak
- Carimañola
- Chebureki
- Chile relleno
- Coxinha
- Curry puffs
- Taquito
- Samosa
- Sgabeo
- Sorullos – sometimes stuffed with cheese.
- Flaky pastry

== Breads and pastries ==
- Bagel dog
- Berliner
- Bierock
- Birnbrot
- Bossche bol
- Cannoli
- Chorley cake
- Cuban pastry
- Curry puff
- Flaons
- Gibanica
- Gujiya
- Gözleme
- Gyeongju bread
- Hot Pockets
- Jambon
- Heong Peng
- Klobasnek
- Knish
- Kolach
- Kołacz
- Makroudh
- Malateet
- Marillenknödel
- Miguelitos
- Milhoja
- Milk-cream strudel
- Moorkop
- Öçpoçmaq
- Panzarotti
- Pastel
- Pastizz
- Pigs in blankets
- Profiterole
- Punschkrapfen
- Quesito
- Runza
- Rustico
- Sausage bread
- Schaumrolle
- Semla
- Sfogliatelle
- Šoldra
- Stromboli
- Toaster pastry
- Torpil
- Tortell
- Turnover

== Wraps ==
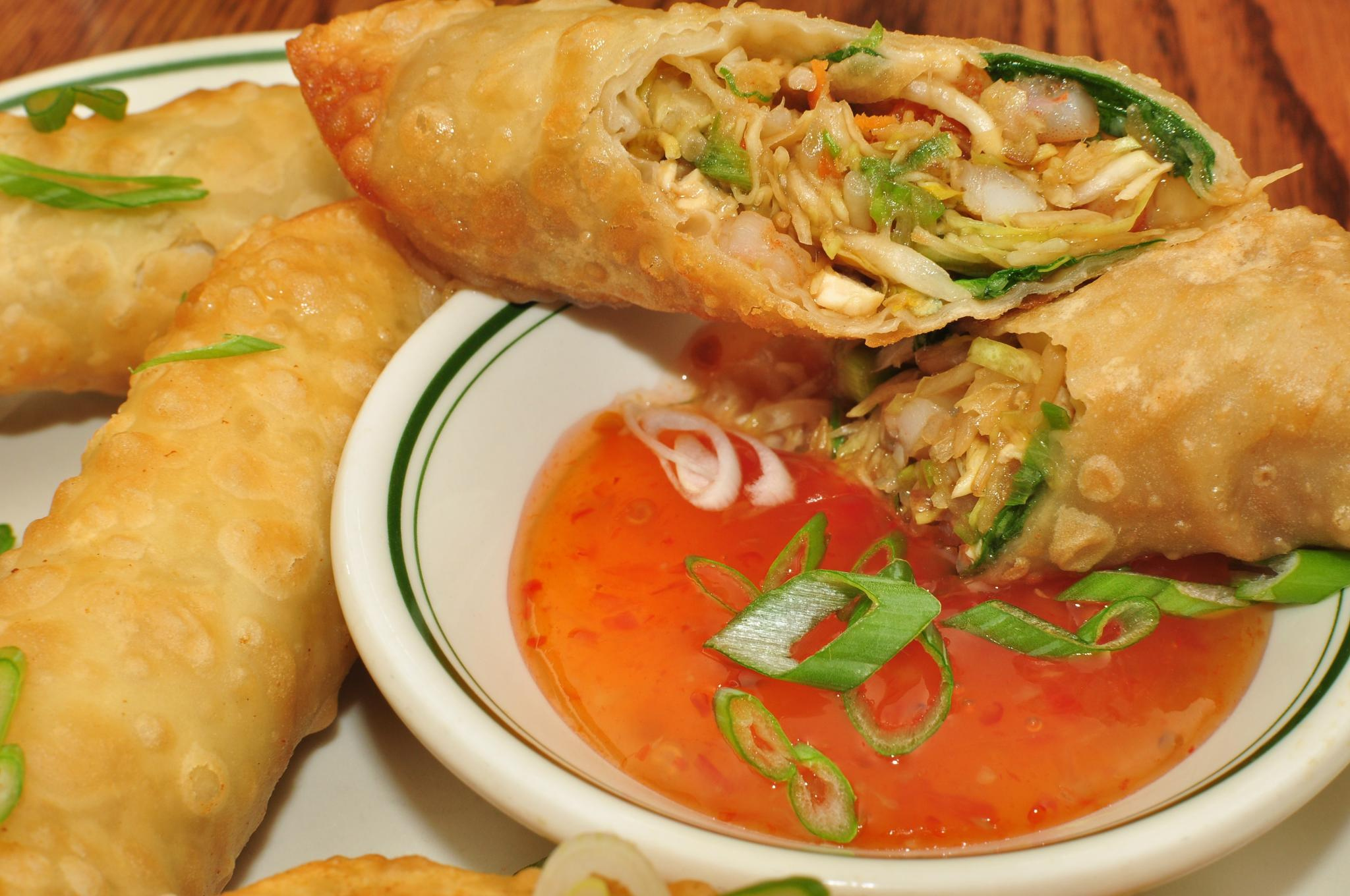
Chicken and shrimp spring rolls

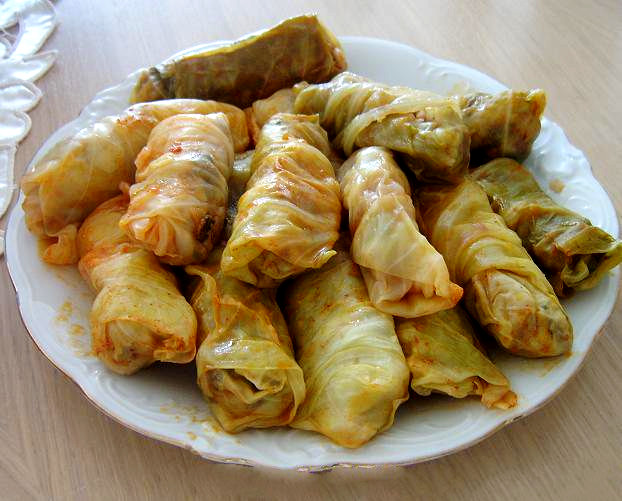
Sarma

- Cabbage roll
  - Holishkes
- Cheese roll
- Chicken fillet roll
- Devils on horseback
- Egg roll
- Galette-saucisse
- Kati roll
- Ngo hiang (also known as heh gerng or lor bak)
- Pepperoni roll
- Prawn roll – a sandwich, not a stuffed food item.
- Rice noodle roll
- Small sausage in large sausage
- Spring roll – a large variety of filled, rolled appetizers or dim sum found in East Asian and Southeast Asian cuisine.
  - Gỏi cuốn
  - Popiah
  - Lumpia
- Sarma (also called "stuffed grape leaves" or "stuffed vine leaves")
- Thịt bò nướng lá lốt

== Game, poultry, offal ==
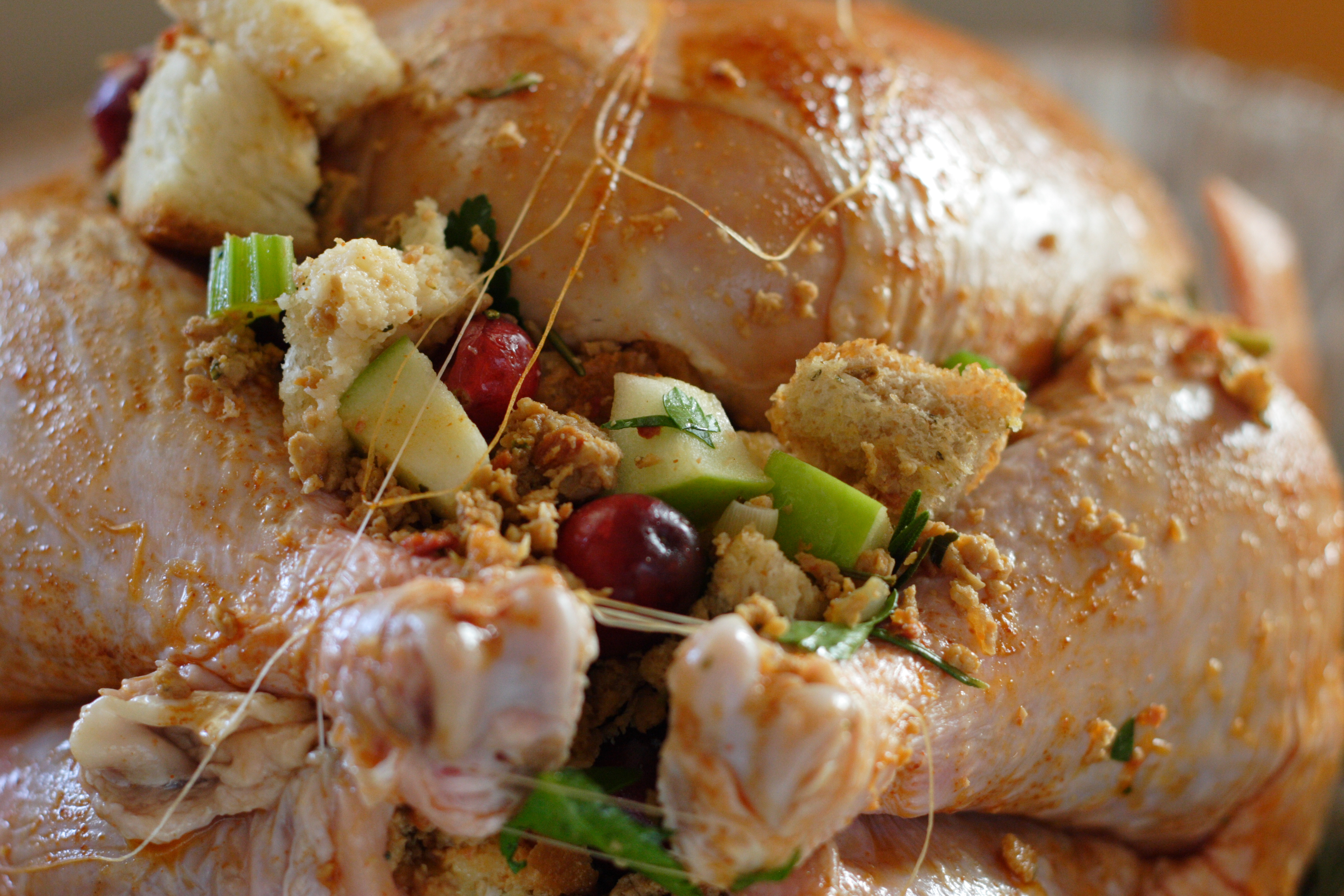
A stuffed turkey, prior to cooking

- Ballotine
- Boliche
- Cachopo
- Carpetbag steak
- Stuffed chine
- Stuffed ham
- Jucy Lucy
- Sapu Mhicha
- Stuffed intestines
- Tripoux
- Turducken
- Turkey
  - Truffled turkey
- Whole stuffed camel
- Zrazy
- Amich (Armenian: ամիչ; Armenian pronunciation: [ɑˈmit͡ʃʰ]), also known depending on the bird used as Armenian-style turkey or Armenian-style chicken, is a dish of Armenian cuisine made from poultry meat (most commonly turkey or chicken) and stuffed with rice and dried fruits. The name of the dish appears in the manuscripts of Armenian authors Faustus of Byzantium (5th century) and Yeghishe (5th century). Historically, the dish was prepared using pheasant and rice with dried fruits.

== Pancakes and crepes ==
- Apam balik
- Bánh xèo
- Blini

== Starch paste cakes ==
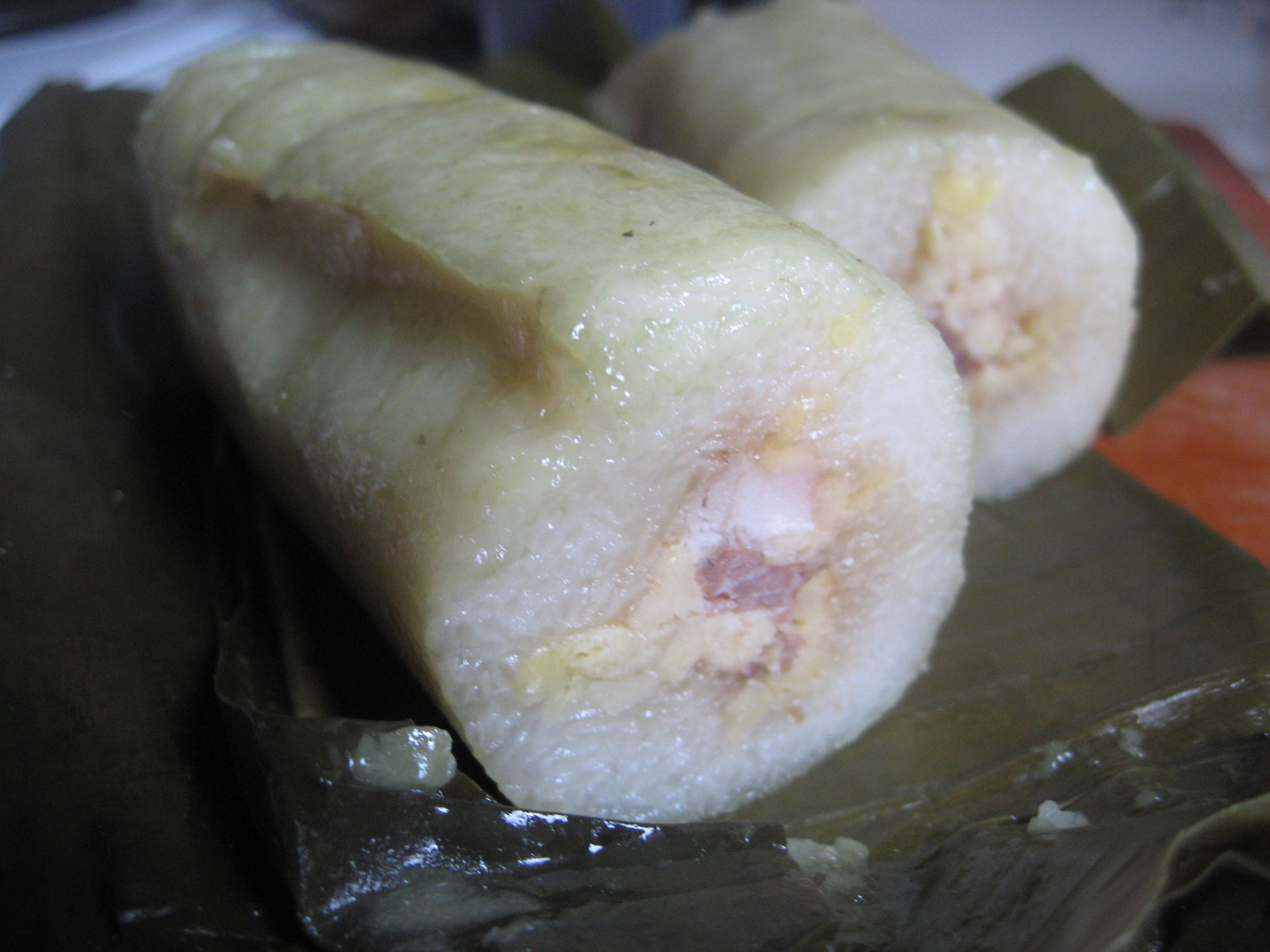
Bánh tét

- Arem-arem
- Bánh chưng
- Bánh lá
- Bánh tét
- Tamale
- Zongzi

== Stuffed pasta ==
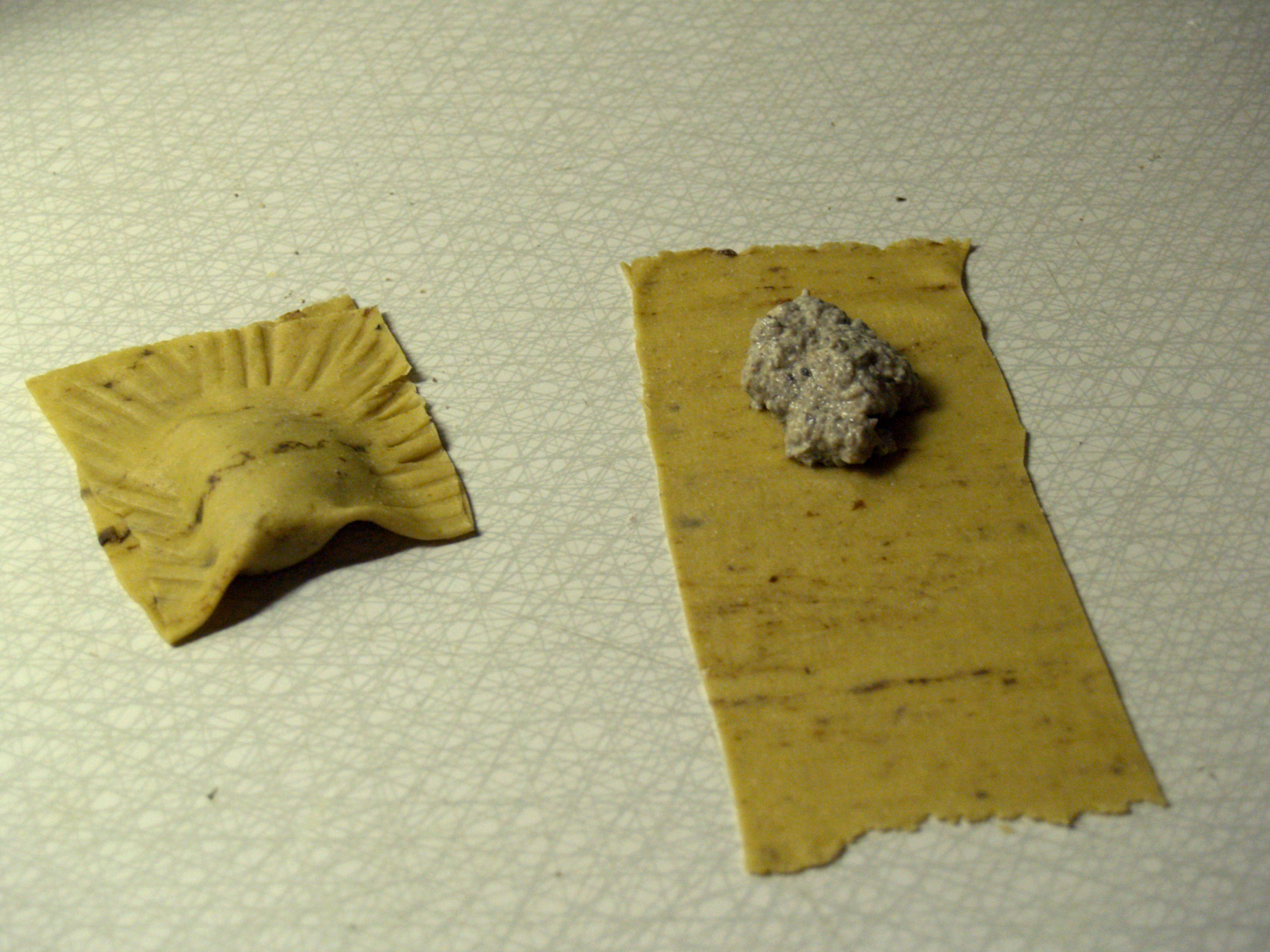
Ravioli

Some pasta varieties and dishes are stuffed with various fillings.

- Agnolotti
- Cannelloni
- Casoncelli
- Casunziei
- Manicotti
- Maultasche
- Mezzelune
- Occhi di Lupo
- Paccheri – sometimes stuffed
- Pavese agnolotti
- Ravioli
- Tortellini
- Tortelloni

== Stuffed pizzas ==
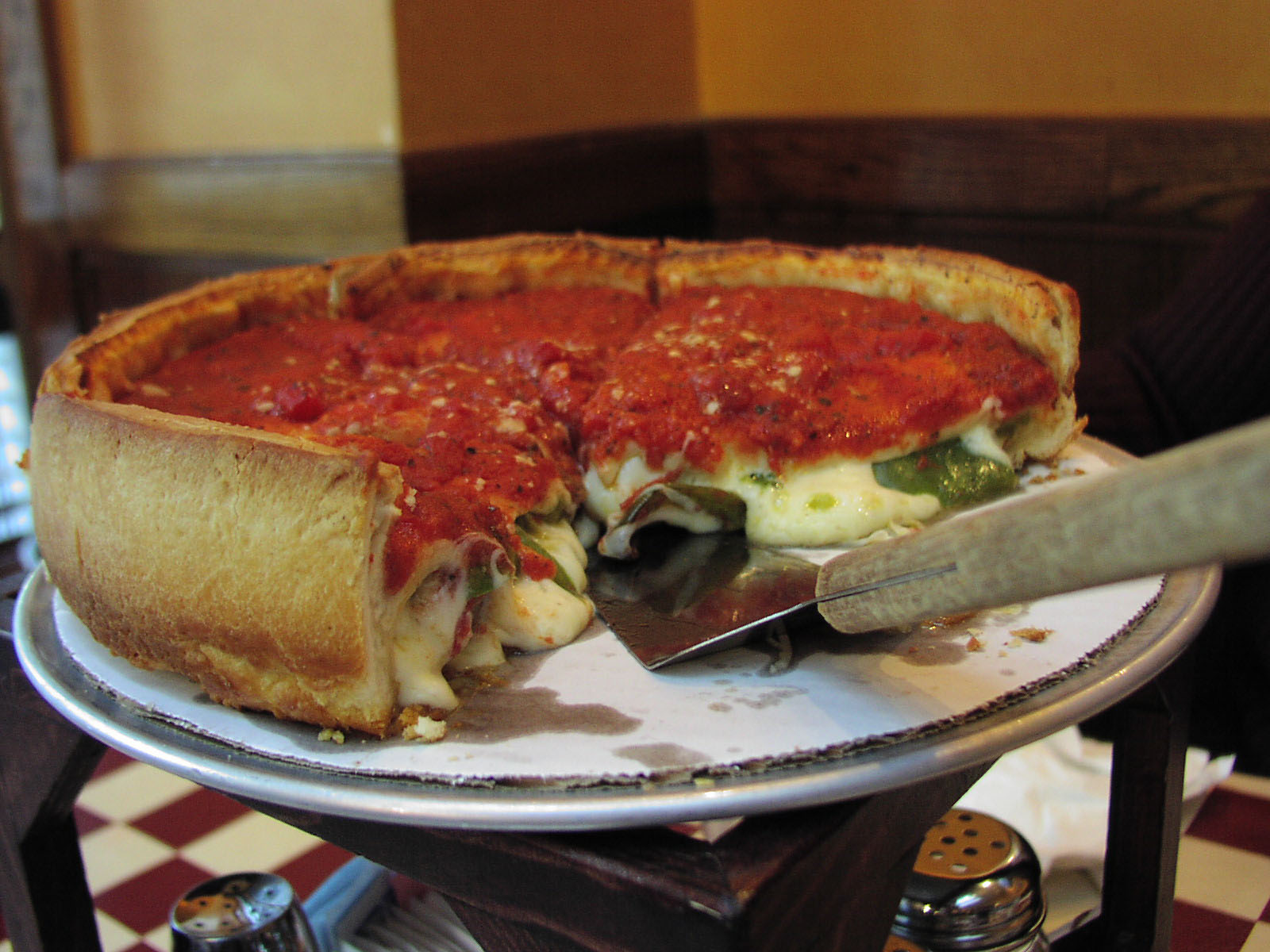
Stuffed pizza at a restaurant

- Calzone
- Pizza rolls
- Scaccia
- Stuffed pizza
- Stuffed crust pizza

== Stuffed vegetables ==
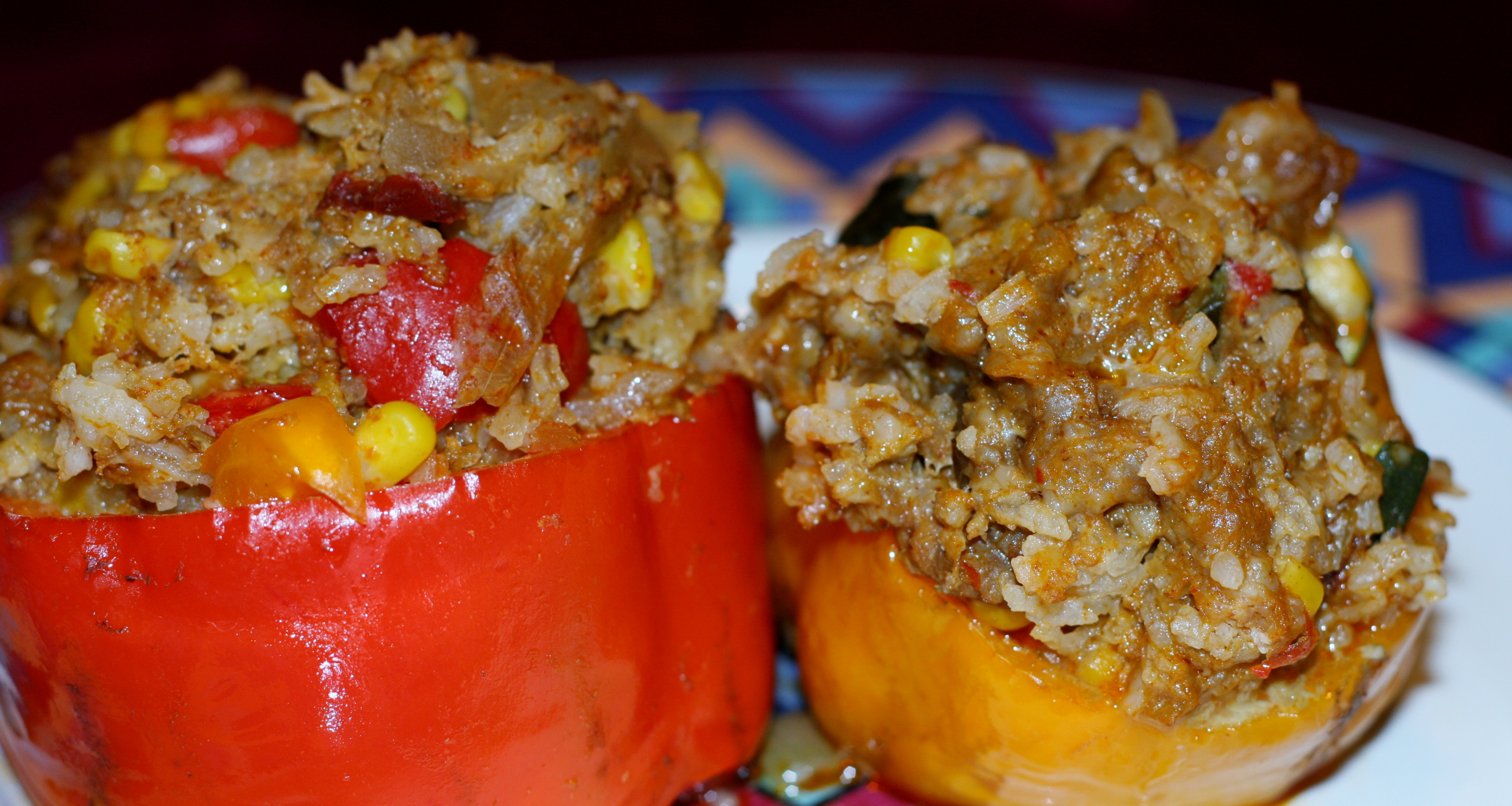
Stuffed peppers

- Badrijani
- Eggplant papucaki
- Makdous
- Seon – traditional Korean dishes which are prepared by steaming vegetables such as zucchini, cucumbers, eggplants, or Napa cabbages that are stuffed with various ingredients.
- Sheikh al-mahshi – zucchini stuffed with minced lamb meat and pine nuts in yogurt sauce.
- Stuffed artichoke
- Stuffed cabbage
- Stuffed cucumber
- Stuffed eggplant
- Stuffed mushrooms
- Stuffed peppers
- Stuffed sorrel
- Stuffed squash
- Stuffed tomatoes

== Stuffed fruits ==
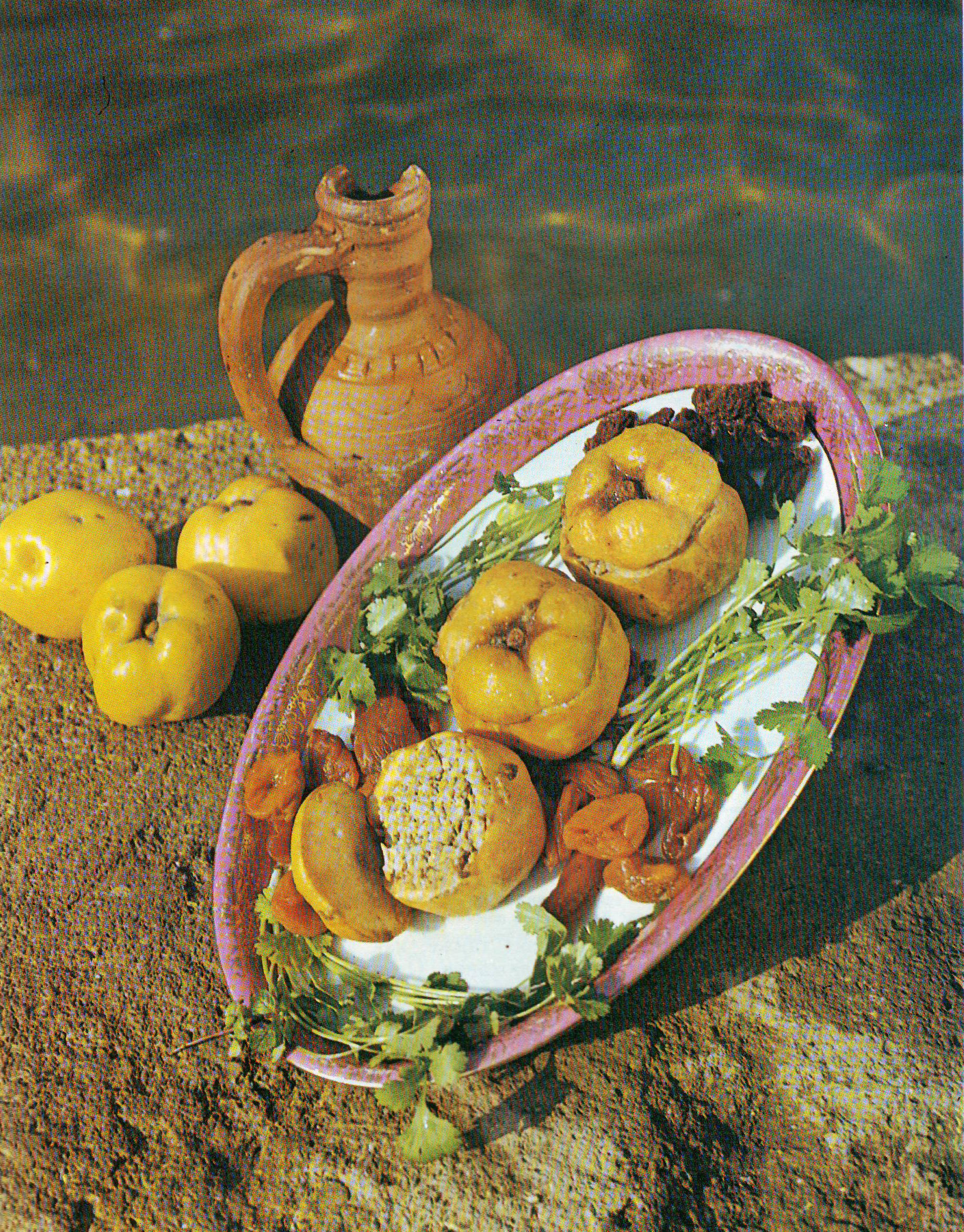
Stuffed quinces

- Stuffed dates
- Stuffed quinces
- Stuffed melon
- Stuffed apples
- Tufahije
- Walnut stuffed figs

== Other stuffed dishes ==
- Börek
- Dolma
- Mantı
- Sarma
- Squash blossom
- Stuffed mallow
- Stuffed ribs

== See also ==
- Cordon bleu (dish) – a dish of meat wrapped around cheese (or with cheese filling), then breaded and pan-fried or deep-fried
- Fritter – a name applied to a wide variety of fried foods, usually consisting of a portion of batter or breading which has been filled with various ingredients
- List of rolled foods
- Pie – a baked dish which is usually made of a pastry dough casing that covers or completely contains a filling of various sweet or savory ingredients
  - Meat pie
  - List of pies, tarts and flans
  - Pies (Category)
  - Savoury pies (Category)
- Roulade – a dish of filled rolled meat or pastry
- Tempura – a Japanese dish of seafood or vegetables that have been battered and deep fried
- Stuffing – a filling foods

=== Lists ===
- List of pies, tarts and flans
