= Sausage bread =

American savory dish

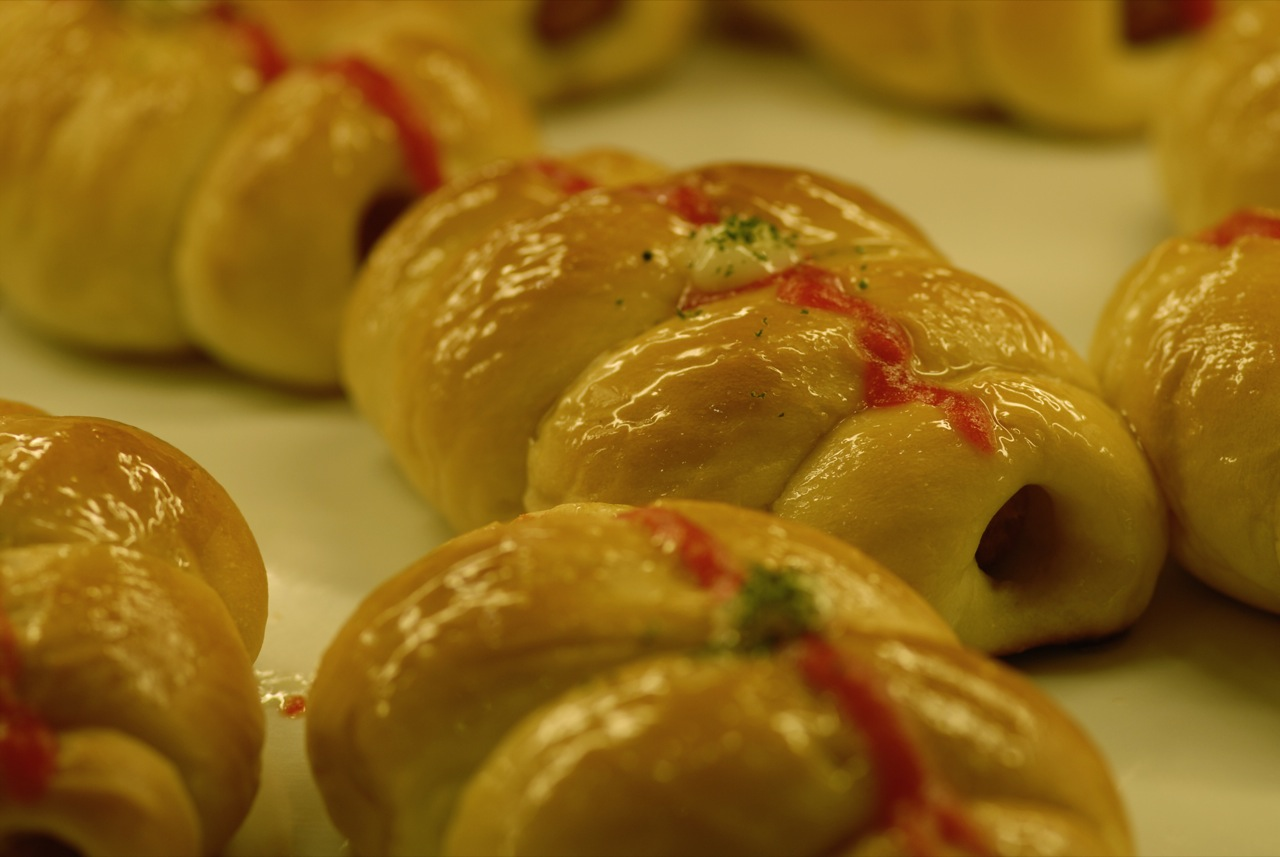
- Sausage bread at a bakery in Cikini, Menteng, Indonesia
- Type: Pizza
- Place of origin: United States
- Main ingredients: Pizza dough, Italian sausage, mozzarella

Sausage bread is an American pizza of sausage and other ingredients rolled or enclosed in dough and cooked in an oven.

Sausage bread is typically made from pizza dough and includes Italian sausage, cheeses such as mozzarella, and other ingredients such as mushrooms and onions, depending on the recipe. If dough is used, the sausage is usually crumbled or cut, and is baked, along with the cheese inside a long piece of rolled pizza dough. Beth Hensperger's The Bread Bible recipe suggests putting the ingredients on a rectangle of dough and lengthwise jelly-roll-style to create a layered sausage bread.

Sausage bread has been modified into sausage bread pudding in an LA Times recipe.

== See also ==
- List of stuffed dishes
