= Scaccia =

Stuffed flat bread in Sicilian cuisine

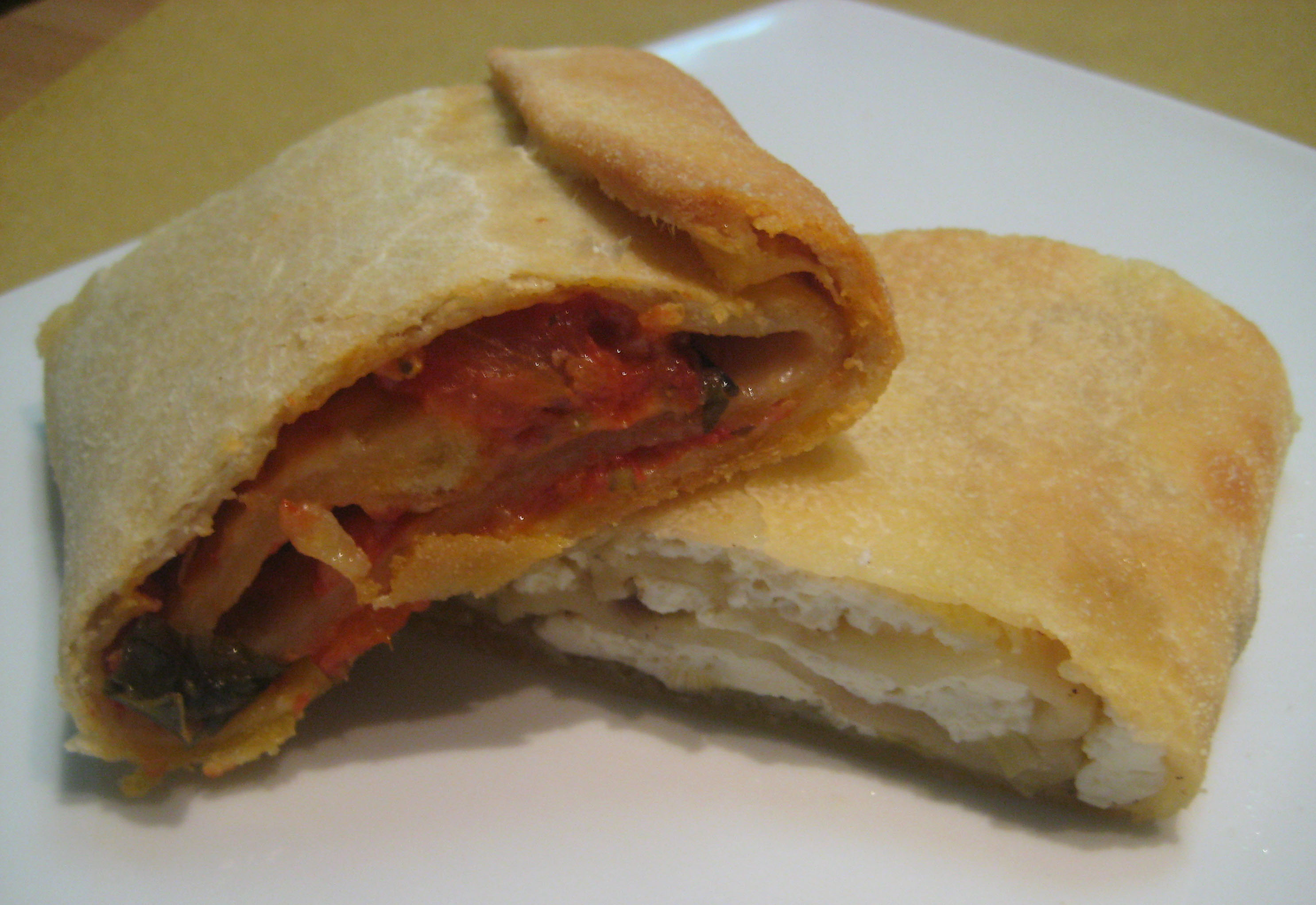
Scaccia with tomato and scaccia with ricotta cheese and onion

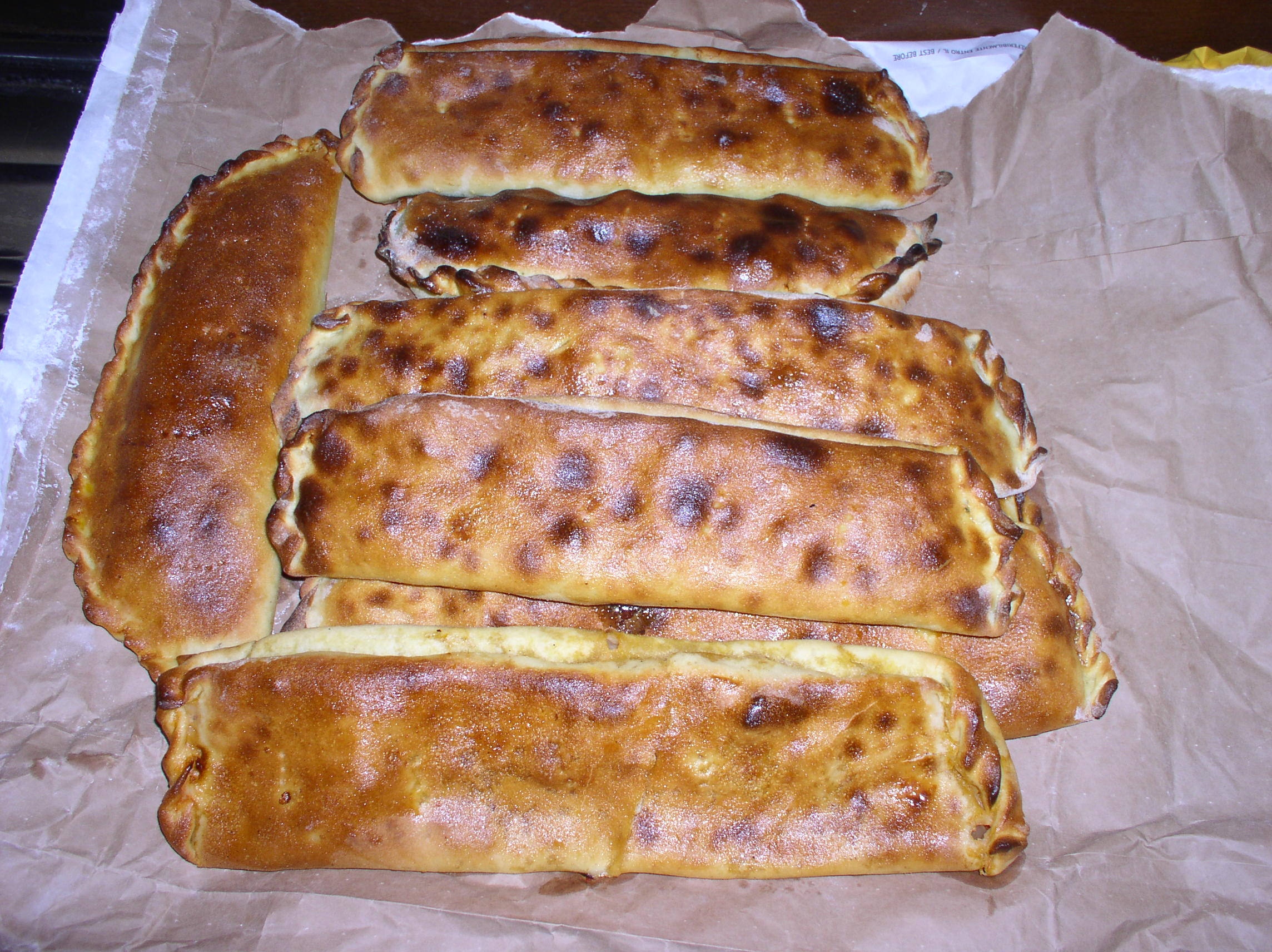
Scacciata

Scaccia (pl.: scacce) or scacciata (pl.: scacciate; from the Sicilian word meaning 'to crush' or 'to flatten') is a Sicilian stuffed baked flatbread, which can be eaten hot or cold. Scaccia is made with a very thin rectangular layer of dough, folded on itself three or four times. It can be stuffed with different ingredients, the more common variations are ricotta cheese and onion, cheese and tomato, tomato and onion, or tomato and eggplant, depending on location, taste, or season. Scaccia can be found in Ragusa and Syracuse, as well as some Sicilian American communities (namely Middletown, Connecticut).

== History ==
Scaccia appeared at the end of the seventeenth century and was a staple of peasant tables. In Sicily, the recipe was handed down and expanded according to the culinary voices of the time. In the rural tables of the Kingdom of Sicily and then Kingdom of the Two Sicilies, this simple recipe was developed based on bread, vegetables and meat, often utilizing the leftovers of a hearty dinner or a recurring lunch.

Scaccia appeared on Sicilian tables at the beginning of the 18th century with the recipe based on vegetables and potatoes. It achieved its success when Moncada himself, prince of Paternò, in 1763, wanted it on his table during the Christmas celebrations.

Since then, tradition has placed it as a Christmas favorite with a recipe handed down for generations. To date, the scaccia has a wide diffusion in the Sicilian territory and a significant artisanal marketing.

== See also ==
Media related to Scaccia at Wikimedia Commons

- Sicilian cuisine
- List of stuffed dishes
