= Stuffed mallow =

Stuffed leaves dish made from malva

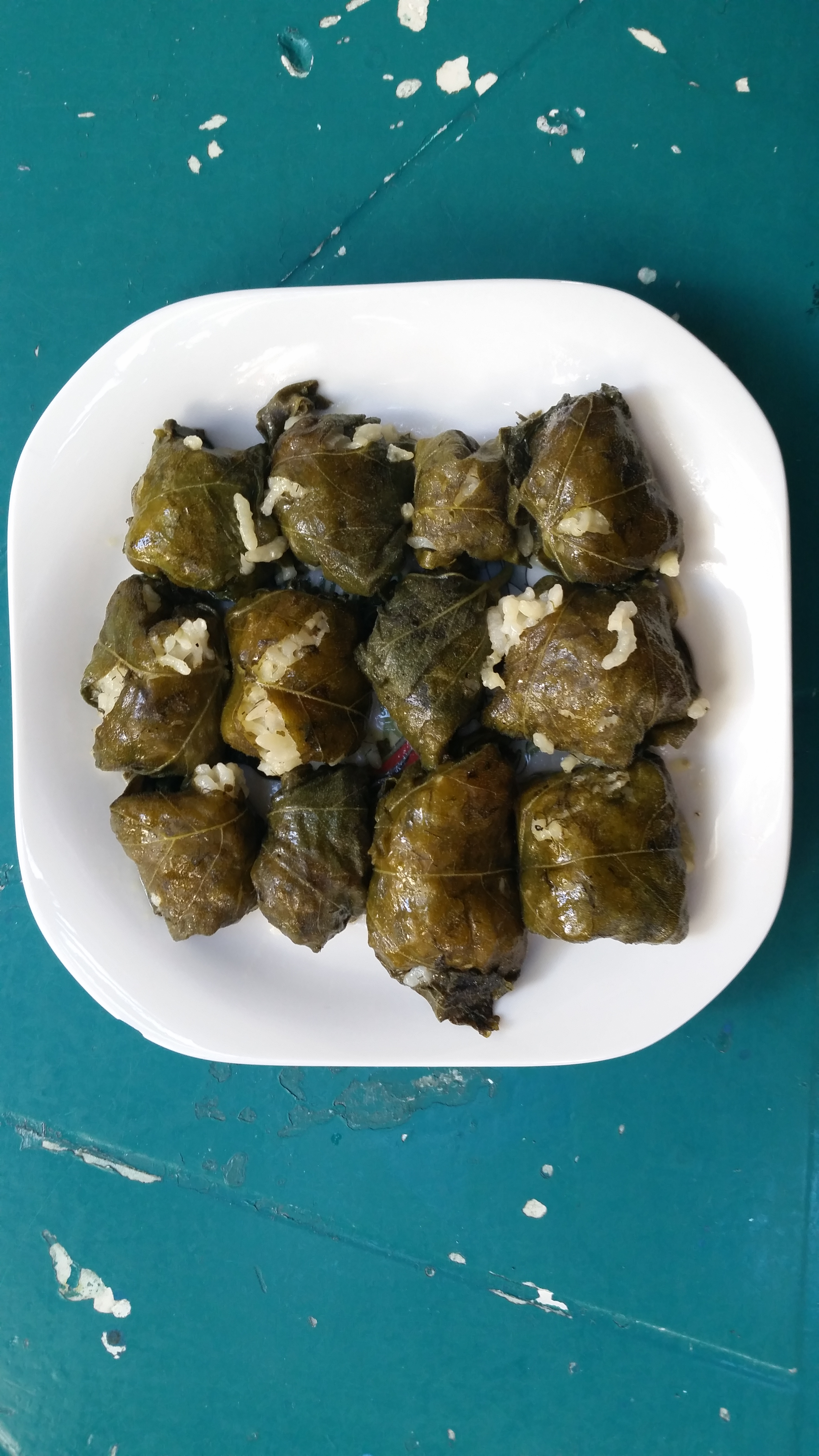
- Greek stuffed mallow with rice and herb filling
- Region or state: Kurdistan, Anatolia, Balkans, Levant
- Serving temperature: Hot

Stuffed mallow (Kurdish: Melûkîyê tije kirî or Dolma ya melûkîyê; Arabic: خبازة محشية; Hebrew: עלי חלמית ממולאים, romanized: Aley Ḥalmith Meemou'laim; Greek: Γεμιστή μολόχα; Turkish: Ebegümeci sarması) is a generic name for dishes made of mallow leaves, stuffed with meat (lamb) and rice, or, more rarely, rice only. Other names are mallow sarma or mallow dolma. It is mostly popular in Kurdistan (Kurdish populated regions), Israel, Lebanon, Syria, Greece, Turkey, Palestine, where it may be served with yogurt.

== Name and etymology ==
Mallow itself is called many names and the names differ between regions; in Arabic, it is sometimes known as khubeza (Arabic: خبيزة), and so stuffed mallow can be referred to as stuffed khubeza.

== Geographical scope ==
Stuffed mallow leaves are common across West Asia and Eastern Europe. Stuffed khobeza, filled with rice, is frequently eaten in the Levant, as well as other regions such as Greece. It is especially common in the Gaza Strip due to the difficulty of access to food; it is used in dishes as an alternative to grape leaves, which would normally be stuffed and cooked.

Stuffed mallow is common among Kurds and the Kurdish diaspora.

The Eucalyptus restaurant offers stuffed mallow on its menu.

== See also ==
- Cabbage roll
- Khubeza patties
- List of stuffed dishes
- Mulukhiyah
- Salvia hierosolymitana
- Stuffed leaves
