= Stuffed leaves =

Stuffed dish

Sarma
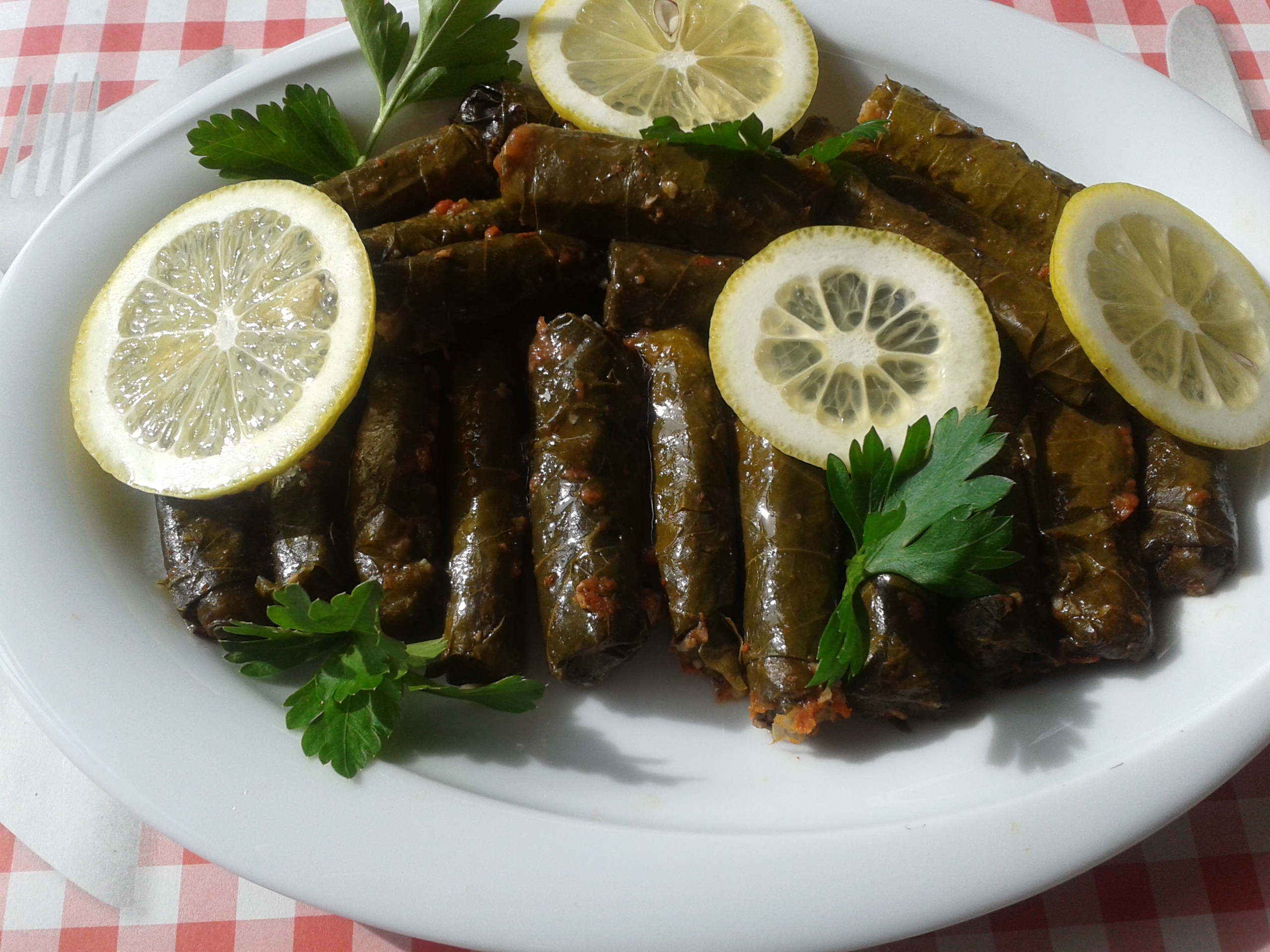
- Type: Dolma
- Course: main course
- Region or state: Ottoman Empire · Eastern Mediterranean
- Serving temperature: hot or cold
- Main ingredients: Cabbage leaves or grape leaves, rice, mince meat
- Variations: With cabbage leaves or vine leaves, minced meat and rice filling (served hot)

Stuffed leaves—more commonly known by its sub-types stuffed grape leaves, stuffed vine leaves, or stuffed cabbage leaves—are a food made of leaves rolled around a filling of minced meat, grains such as rice, or both. It is occasionally known in the English-speaking world by its Turkish name, sarma, which, as a dish of the Ottoman Empire, is also used in Armenian and some Central and Eastern European languages. Since the Ottoman Empire's dissolution, its popularity persists in Turkish, Romanian, Moldovan, Bulgarian, Serbian, Hungarian, Bosnian, Croatian, Kosovan, Albanian, Montenegrin, Slovenian, Macedonian, Greek, Armenian, Uzbek, Persian, Iraqi, Levantine, Egyptian, Indian and Bengali cuisines.

Wrapped leaf dishes are part of the broader category of stuffed dishes known as dolma, and they have equivalents (such as the Polish gołąbki) in other Central and Eastern European cuisines from the Baltic states through Slovakia. The type of leaves used commonly includes cabbage, patience dock, collard, grapevine, kale, or chard leaves.

== Terminology and etymology ==
The word sarma is a Turkish word meaning "wrap" or "wrapped thing". In Turkish culinary terminology, sarma refers specifically to foods in which a filling is wrapped in leaves such as vine or cabbage leaves, in contrast to dolma, which more properly denotes vegetables that are stuffed. Although the exact origins of dishes made by stuffing vegetables and leaves are not known for certain, sarma originated in the Ottoman cuisine and reached its most significant historical form within that culinary tradition.

Sarma made with grape leaves are called yaprak sarması (lit. 'leaf sarma') or yaprak dolması (lit. 'leaf dolma') in Turkish. In other languages they are translated as yabraq (يبرق) or waraq 'inab (ورق عنب) lit. 'vine leaves' or waraq dawālī (ورق دوالي) in Arabic, yarpaq dolması (lit. 'leaf dolma') in Azerbaijani, and dolme barg-e mo (دلمه برگ مو, lit. 'vine leaf dolma') in Persian. In Assyrian, it is called ܦܪܵܟܼܹܐ (prakhe) which refers to the fact that the rice is rubbed in the grape leaves. In Kurdish it is called یاپراخ (yaprakh) or دۆڵمە (dolma). In Armenian, they are called մսով տերեւափաթաթ (missov derevapatat), տերեւի տոլմա (derevi dolma), թփով դոլմա (t'pov dolma) and տերեւի սարմա (derevi sarma). In Greek, they are generally called σαρμάδες (sarmathes) or σαρμαδάκια (sarmathakia), but they may be also referred to as ντολμάδες (dolmathes), γιαπράκια (yaprakia), γιαπράκια γιαλαντζί (yaprakia yalandzi), ντολμαδάκια (dolmathakia), ντολμαδάκια γιαλαντζί (dolmathakia yalandzi).

Stuffed leaves without meat are sometimes called yalancı dolma, which means "liar's dolma" in Turkish. Similarly, in other languages it is known as yalançı dolma (Azerbaijani), yalanchi or yalanchy sarma (Armenian). Vişneli yalancı dolması is a variation of stuffed vine leaves where the rice is seasoned with cinnamon, allspice, and mint. The dolmas are slowly cooked together with morello cherries (vişne), and plums may be used also.

In Bulgarian and Macedonian cabbage and grapevine leaves are not usually differentiated.

Stuffed chard leaves are called pazı dolması, and dolmas de pazi by Sephardi Jews who settled in Argentina.

== Background ==
A grapevine leaf roll is a dish consisting of cooked grapevine leaves wrapped around a variety of fillings.

Vine leaves may also be used to wrap stuffed celery root. Before wrapping, the celery root is stuffed with rice that has been seasoned with cinnamon, salt, pepper, allspice, pine nuts, and sugar (this type of rice is called iç pilav). Dried fruits like fig and apricot may be added to the rice mixture before the celery root is stuffed, wrapped, and baked in the oven. Some variations may include quince.

== Regional and national variants ==
=== Turkey ===
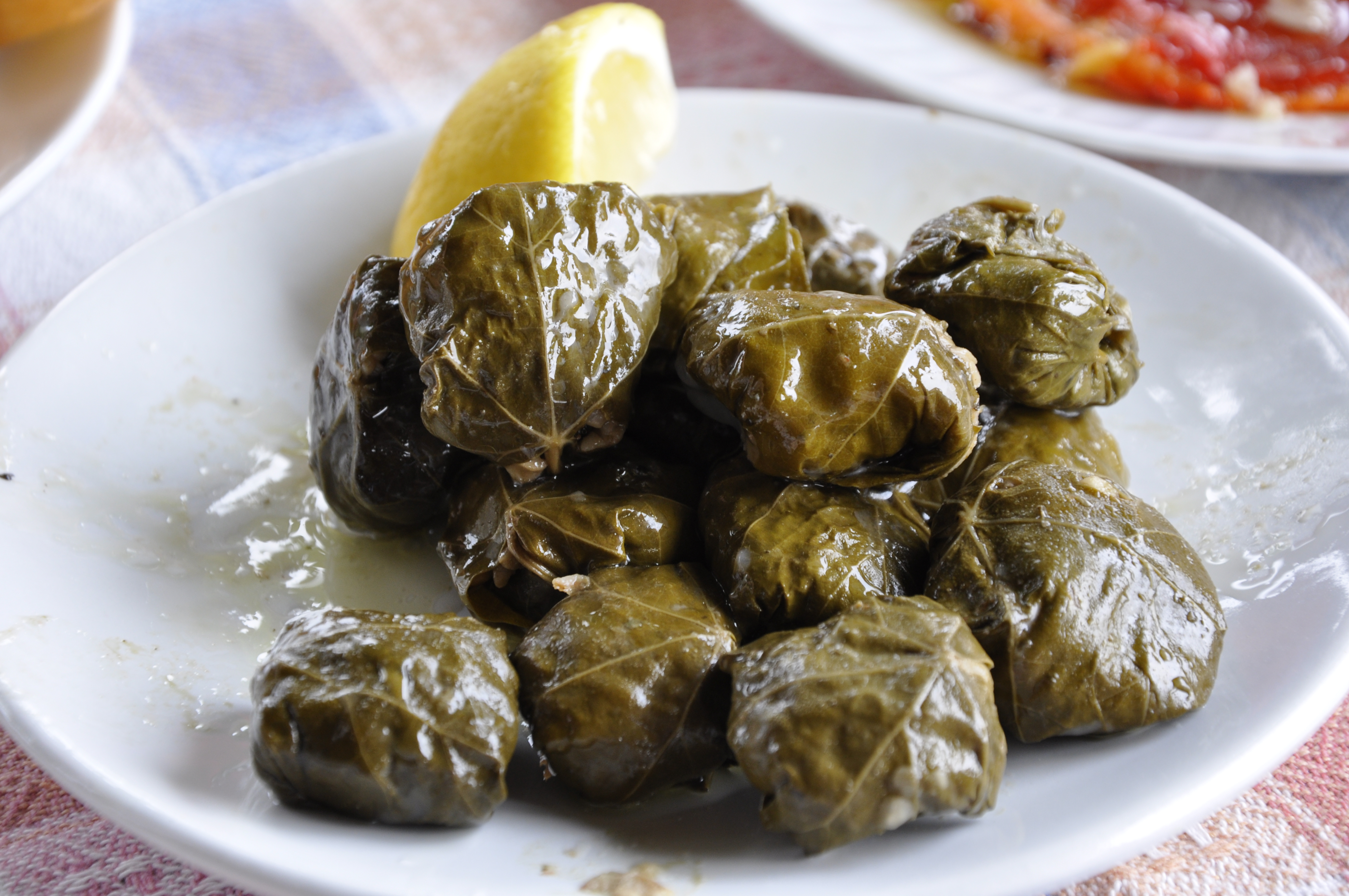
Variants of sarma from Turkey

There are many regional variations of sarma in Turkish cuisine; the following have each received an official geographical indication from the Turkish Patent and Trademark Office.

In the Turkish provinces of Amasya and Tokat, sarma is prepared in a style similar to maklouba, with different fillings. One version made with fava beans is called bakla sarma or Amasya baklalı dolması. The filling for this variant from Amasya is made with dried fava beans and a coarsely ground wheat called yarma cooked in a seasoned tomato sauce. The wrapped sarma are layered over bone-in lamb chops and slowly simmered in the cooking liquid. The finished dish is served upside down. A similar variation from Tokat is stuffed with a lentil, bulgur, and chickpea filling. Homemade red pepper paste may be substituted for some of the tomato paste.

A variation is known from the municipality of Arapgir that is filled with minced meat, bulgur, onions, parsley, tomato paste, red pepper flakes, and black pepper, and served in tomato sauce with butter.

Another variation, from Beypazarı, is filled with minced lamb meat, rice, onions, green onions, parsley, dill, red pepper flakes, black pepper, tomato paste, salt, and lemon juice.

Historic to the Malatya Province is a variation made using tender grape leaves from the Arapgir Köhnü grape variety. There, it is filled with minced meat, bulgur, rice, onions, parsley, tomato paste, chili paste, chili peppers, black pepper, salt, and lemon, then cooked in a broth made of tomato paste, chili paste, water, and oil.

A variation from Erzurum, known as ekşili dolma (lit. 'sour dolma') or Erzurum ekşili dolma, is made using a sour pestil (dried fruit pulp) made from Prunus spinosa fruit, known regionally as salur or salor. This pulp is cooked into the stuffing, along with ground meat, rice, onions, black pepper, and salt.

=== Romania and Moldova ===
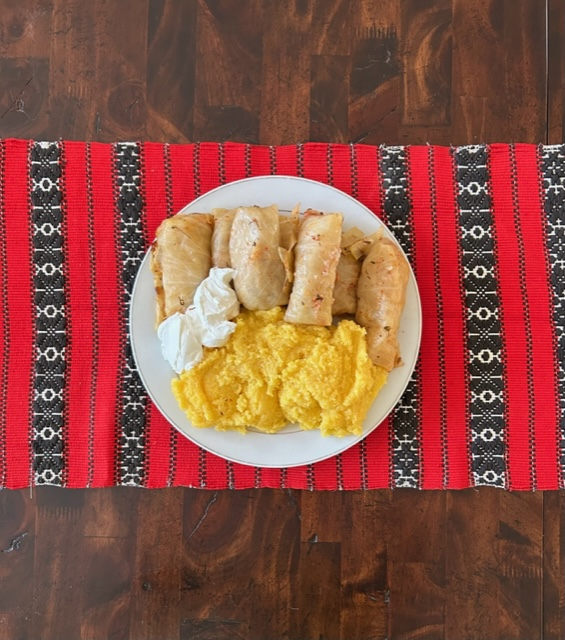
Romanian sarmale with polenta and sour cream

In Romania and Moldova, sarmale (singular sarma) are popular in all historical regions, including Moldavia, Transylvania, and Wallachia. Sarmale are a central part of Romanian cuisine and are the country's national dish. Romania has a significant garden and farm culture, and Romanians grow many of the ingredients, such as cabbage, near their homes. The Romanian poet Păstorel Teodoreanu wrote a poem about sarmale, comparing it to a "bouquet of spices". In Romania, sarmale are valued for being filling and for their ability to be cooked in large batches that stay fresh for days. Each usually consists of minced pork, rice, onion, eggs, thyme, and dill rolled in a leaf, usually a cabbage leaf - either fresh or sweet (varză dulce) or pickled (varză murată/acră). The baking dish - or usually nowadays a large pot on the stove is lined with either chopped (fresh/dulce) cabbage and/or sauerkraut layered with smoked bacon (slănină afumată), "ciolan afumat"/smoked pork ham hock and/or pork belly and the cabbage rolls, which are then topped with more sauerkraut or fresh chopped cabbage and dill sprigs. The cooking water is poured over the assembled tray/large pot, a mixture of sauerkraut juice and brine from other pickles and seasonings, tomato juice may also be used for boiling and adding a more acidic hit to the dish. People let their sarmale sit with the smoked meat in the baking dish for a couple of days so the flavors fully absorb, particularly when serving the dish to visitors. During the fasting season of Lent there are alternative versions of sarmale that might replace the pork with smoked fish and include vegetables such as carrots by grating them with also mushrooms. It is typically accompanied by mămăligă or bread and smântână/sour cream. It is a traditional dish for Easter and Christmas meals. Although typically made with cabbage either pickled or fresh, other leaves such as grapevine may be used when in season or if kept in the freezer. Other filling such as split maize is/was also used during Lent or historically when rice was harder to obtain in the countryside.

A deconstructed variant of this dish is varză a la Cluj, originating from around the municipality of Cluj-Napoca, Romania. It is made in successive layers of cabbage cut into strips and minced meat (usually pork) and rice topped with sour cream and eaten with bread or polenta.

The famous Romanian poet and writer Mihai Eminescu frequented an inn in Iași, Romania called "Hanul Trei Sarmale" where he met other writers like Ion Creangă,Vasile Alecsandri and various others, the inn would famously serve like its name suggests 3 sarmale rolls to its clients; the building was demolished in 2022 by its owner. Sarmale were also a favourite of the Queen Maria (Marie) of Romania alongside mici/mititei (Romanian meat rolls) and cozonac (traditional Romanian dessert, usually made with walnut or poppy seeds, and sometimes braided).

=== Bulgaria ===
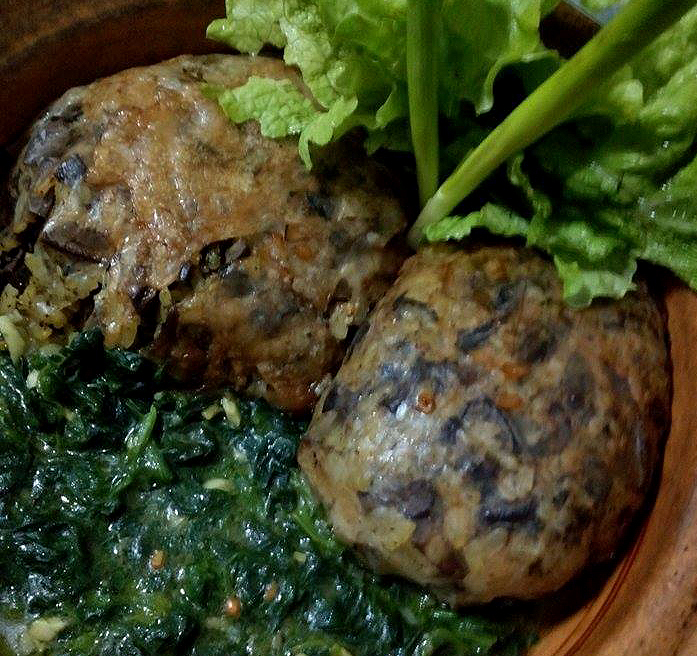
Drob sarma

In Bulgaria, besides the two main rolled varieties—cabbage sarma (usually eaten in winter) and grape leaf sarma (in spring and summer)—there is also a layered variety called drob sarma (дроб сарма, literally 'liver sarma'). Drob sarma is a dish of finely chopped offal (liver and lung), rice, browned onions, herbs, baked in an oven, and after a while covered with a mixture of eggs and yogurt and baked again. The dish may be covered or even wrapped in caul fat before being baked. All sarma dishes can be served with fresh yogurt on the side.

=== Serbia ===
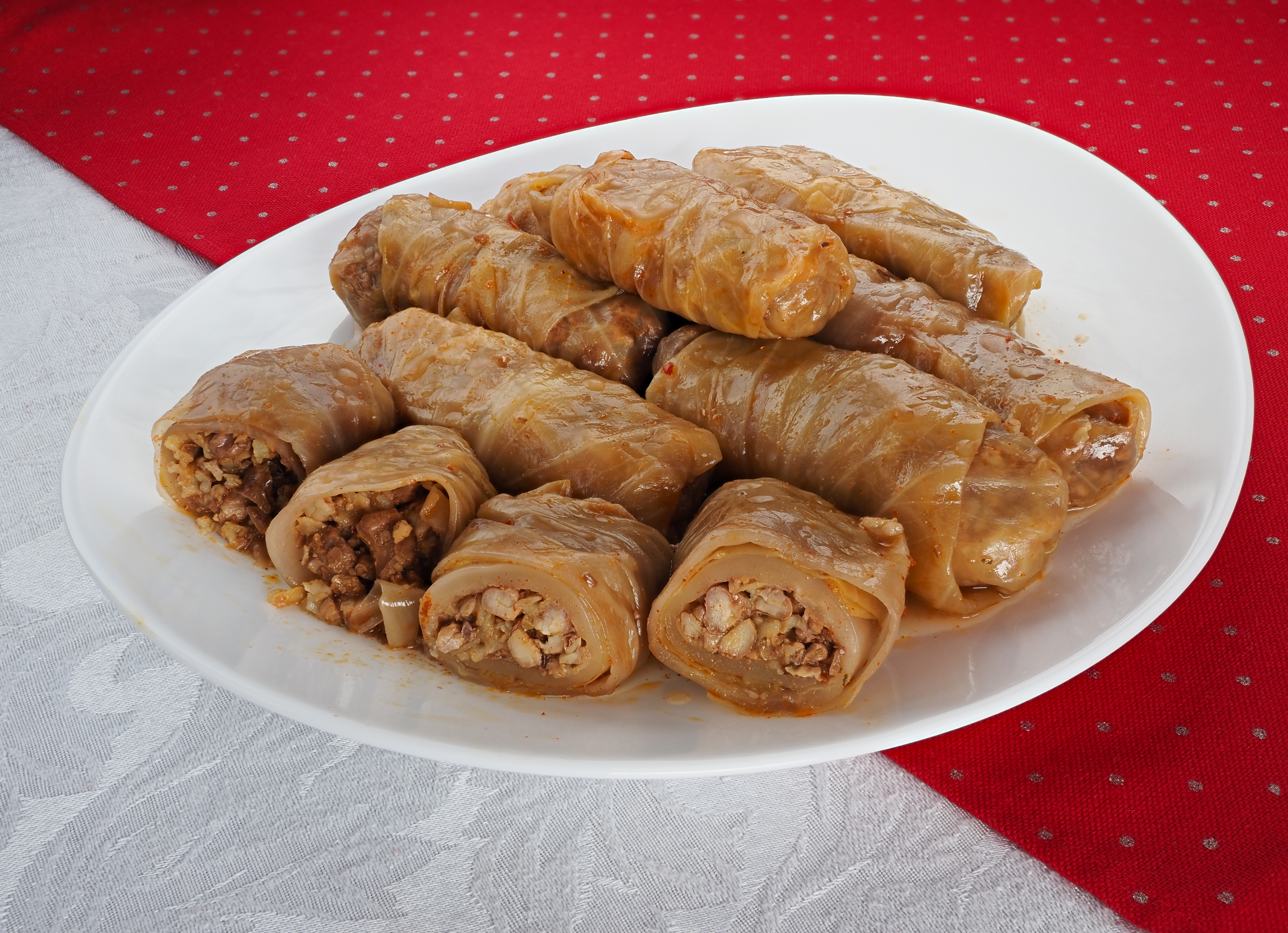
Vegetarian sarma served during fasting before Orthodox Christmas in Serbia

In Serbia, the classic form of stuffed cabbage rolls contains minced meat, which could be pork or beef. In the winter, fermented cabbage leaves (sauerkraut) are utilized as a wrap. During the spring and summer, grapevine leaves replace sauerkraut, which is usually made in winter. In Serbia, sarma are the first appetizers at celebrations such as the slavas. A vegetarian version of sarma is eaten during the observance of Lent and on Christmas Eve. These vegetarian sarma can be composed of rice, onions, potatoes, walnuts, and spices, with sauerkraut as a wrap.

=== Hungary ===
In Hungarian cuisine, the dish is known as töltött káposzta, szárma or sarma. It features cabbage leaves filled with minced pork or beef (or sometimes turkey), eggs, onions, and rice. The filling is typically seasoned with (hot) paprika, caraway, salt, and pepper. It is usually topped with soured cream. The variation of the dish wrapped in vine leaves is commonly known as töltike.

=== Croatia ===
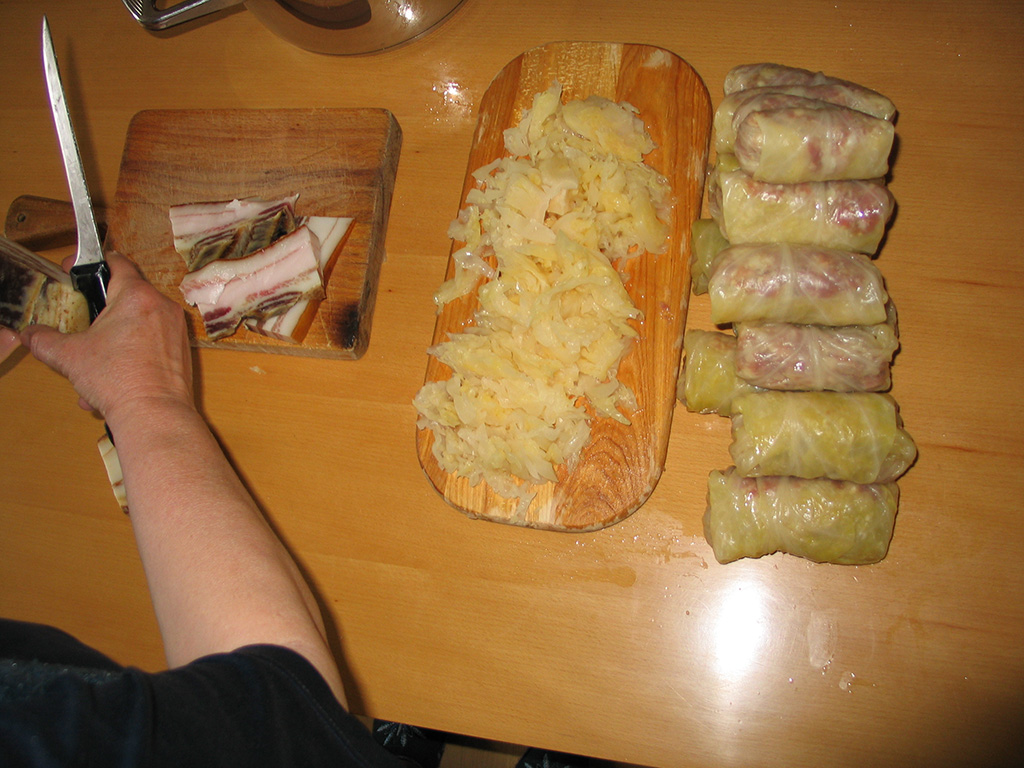
Preparation of Sinjski Arambaši, Croatia's intangible cultural heritage

In Croatia, sarma is common throughout the country though there are regional variations. Sarma is typically a meat dish filled with a combination of beef, pork, and rice, wrapped in sauerkraut leaves. In some regions, fresh cabbage is used. Sarma is a winter staple and is also traditionally served on New Year's Eve. In Croatia, sarma is eaten with mashed potatoes, bread, corn bread, or sour cream. A variant of sarma, Sinjski Arambaši from Sinj, is made from ground beef and cured pork fat (slanina), wrapped in sauerkraut leaves, with no grains, and simmered with shredded sauerkraut, smoked pork and mutton, and beef bone. The preparation method of Sinjski Arambaši is protected intangible cultural heritage of Croatia.

=== Albania ===
In Albania, sarme is cigar-shaped and is often made in the northern regions, but can be found all through. It is typically made of cabbage or grape leaves and filled with meat, rice, and spices. It can be served with yogurt or a yogurt-based drink. It can be a meal for special occasions or during the winter. In southern Albania, a lemon slice can be added while cooking the stuffing.

=== Cyprus ===
In Cyprus koupepia, also known as dolmades, are made with ground beef and pork, rice, and a tomato and cinnamon sauce all wrapped in a grape leaf. Koupepia arrived in Cyprus with Greek immigrants in 1200 BC. Cyprus koupepia use a creamy tart tomato and cinnamon sauce instead of the Greek avgolemono sauce of eggs mixed with lemons.

=== Egypt ===
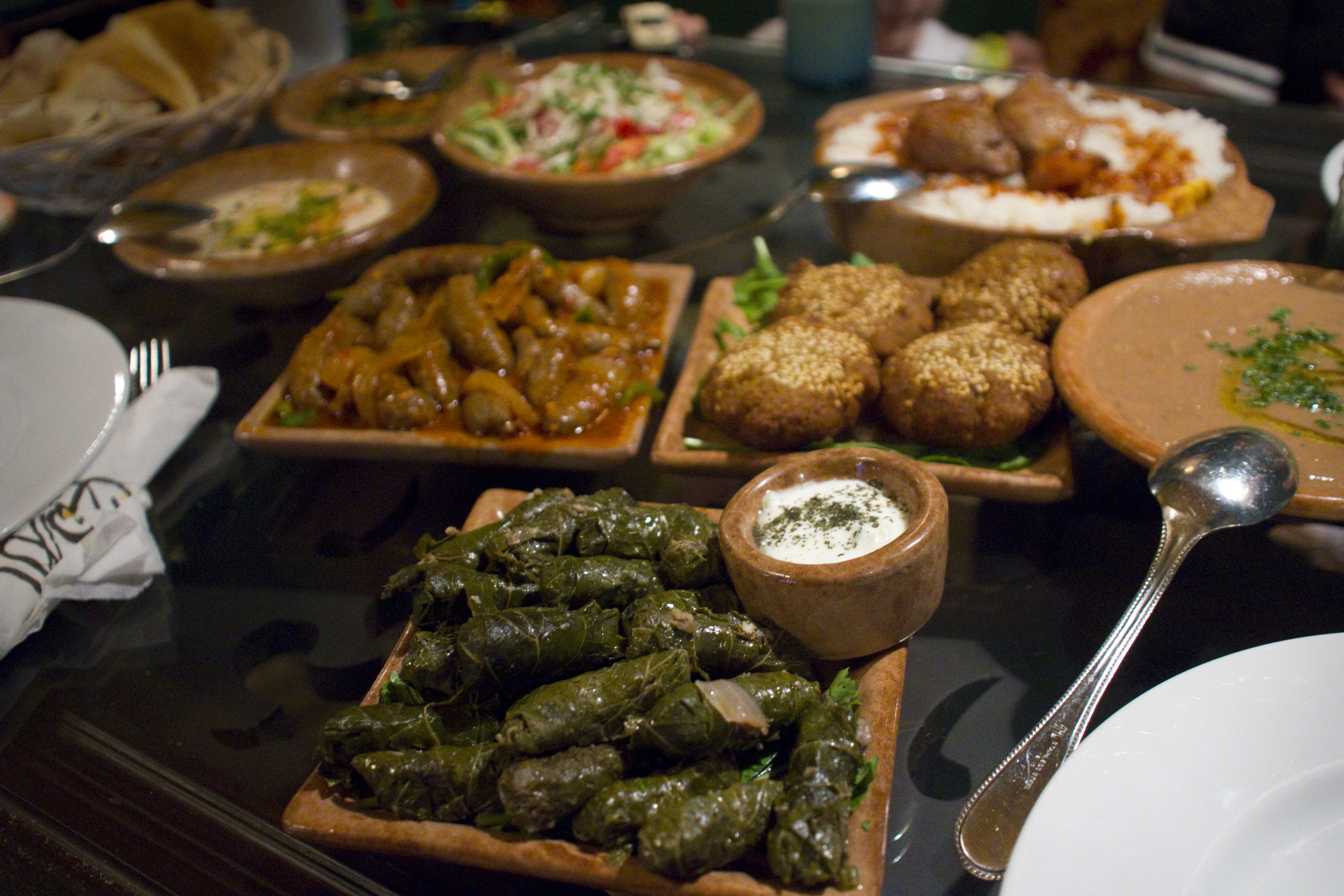
An Egyptian tablespread featuring mahshi waraq enab

In Egypt stuffed grape leaves are called mahshi waraq enab (محشي ورق عنب), The filling typically consists of short-grain rice combined with fresh herbs such as parsley, dill, and mint, seasoned with spices like allspice and cumin. In some Egyptian households, ground beef or lamb is incorporated into the stuffing to enhance the flavor and provide a heartier meal. Once rolled, the grape leaves are neatly arranged in a pot lined with tomato slices or onion rings to prevent sticking and to infuse additional flavor. They are then cooked slowly in a broth until tender and infused with the aromatic flavors of the filling. This dish is often served warm or at room temperature.

=== Greece ===
In Greece, the dish is now known as dolmades. In ancient Greece, fresh tender fig leaves called "thrion" were used instead of grape leaves to create the dish. In some parts of Greece today, fig leaves are still used. Nowadays, the fillings vary, like they probably did in ancient times as well. Rice is the most common filling today, which was unavailable in the region in ancient times. It has been conjectured that another type of grain, such as spelt, might have been used instead.

In addition, in the Byzantine Empire, there were recipes using stuffed vine leaves, considered to have been the direct precursor of the Greek dolmades.

=== Levant ===
In the Levant, grape leaves are rolled up and stuffed with meat (beef or lamb) and rice, and served with whole chunks of meat cooked in the same pot. The rice may be swapped with bulgur. Palestinian lahmeh bi-l-waraq omits the rice and uses kofta as filling; the grape leaves are meant to keep the meat moist during cooking. Christians make vegetarian (siyami) stuffed leaves for Lent.

In spring, grape leaves are picked and sold fresh in public markets for consumption.

The leaves of various wild plants other than grapes are sometimes used as well; these can be bought from markets or foraged, such as Salvia hierosolymitana leaves, Cyclamen persicum leaves, or malva leaves to make stuffed mallow, among other plants.

=== Crimean Tatars (Crimea, Ukraine) ===
Crimean Tatar sarma

In the cuisine of the Crimean Tatars there is a dish called "sarma", which is prepared from grape leaves. The name of the dish means 'wrapped in'. The stuffing consists of minced beef or lamb, rice, chopped onion, salt, and ground pepper. Sometimes tomato paste, some greens, carrots, and other spices can be added to the filling. Due to the influence of Ukrainian cuisine (holubtsi), sarma is also sometimes prepared from cabbage leaves. Dolma for Crimean Tatars is stuffed pepper; the filling for dolma is the same as for sarma.

=== Danube Swabians ===
Danube Swabians have a version of sarma with cabbage leaves, ground pork, onion, garlic, rice, and tomato sauce.

== See also ==
- Buntil
- Cabbage roll
- Holishkes
- Ladera
- List of cabbage dishes
- List of stuffed dishes
- Tamale
