= BMNH =

BMNH may refer to:

- BMNH, the museum code the British Museum of Natural History, London used until the 1990s. It now uses NHMUK.
- Beijing Museum of Natural History, in Beijing, China
- Biblical Museum of Natural History, in Beit Shemesh, Israel
