= Biblical Museum of Natural History =

Museum in Beit Shemesh, Israel

Coordinates: 31.764015°N 34.988740°E

- Established: 2014
- Location: 103 Choshen Street, Hartuv, Israel
- Type: Natural history
- Director: Rabbi Dr. Natan Slifkin
- Website: BiblicalNaturalHistory.org

The Biblical Museum of Natural History (Hebrew: מוזיאון הטבע התנ"כי, romanized: Muzeyum haTeva haTanakhi), currently located in Hartuv at the entrance to Beit Shemesh, Israel, was founded in 2014 by Rabbi Dr. Natan Slifkin, affectionately referred to as the "Zoo Rabbi."

== Vision and purpose ==
The establishment describes itself as "part natural history museum, part zoo" and is meant to "enhance the appreciation and understanding of biblical scripture and Jewish tradition via the natural world." Visitors are able to gain insight into the animals that lived in Israel during biblical times even if they no longer exist there now, such as bears and crocodiles.

Visitors to the museum are currently directed by special tour by appointment only. Features include live animal, taxidermy and skeleton exhibits, as well as audio/visual presentations. Tour topics include unraveling incidents of misidentification of animals by biblical scholars of species mentioned in both the Five Books of Moses and the Talmud due to their lack of familiarity with different families that are not represented in places like Europe, where much of the Jewish medieval biblical commentary was written.

== History ==
In 2017 the Museum held a "Feast of Exotic Curiosities," at which foods including locusts, guineafowl, and water buffalo, that are described as kosher in the Bible but rarely served, were prepared by chef Moshe Basson of The Eucalyptus, a restaurateur known for his contemporary preparations of biblical foods.

In 2020 the Museum moved from its old premises in the Bet Shemesh industrial zone to a new facility on Route 38, opposite the entrance to Beit Shemesh.

During the summer of 2021, the Museum's male and female burmese pythons successfully bred and gave birth to 38 eggs. The Museum hosted a 'kiddush' in their honour.

== Related works ==
Slifkin has authored the first volume of what will be a large collection of information related to the interplay of Judaism and zoology entitled The Torah Encyclopedia of the Animal Kingdom. The encyclopedia will attempt to cover all animals mentioned in the Jewish scripture and highlight little known historical facts such as population diversity and habitation during biblical times.

== Gallery ==
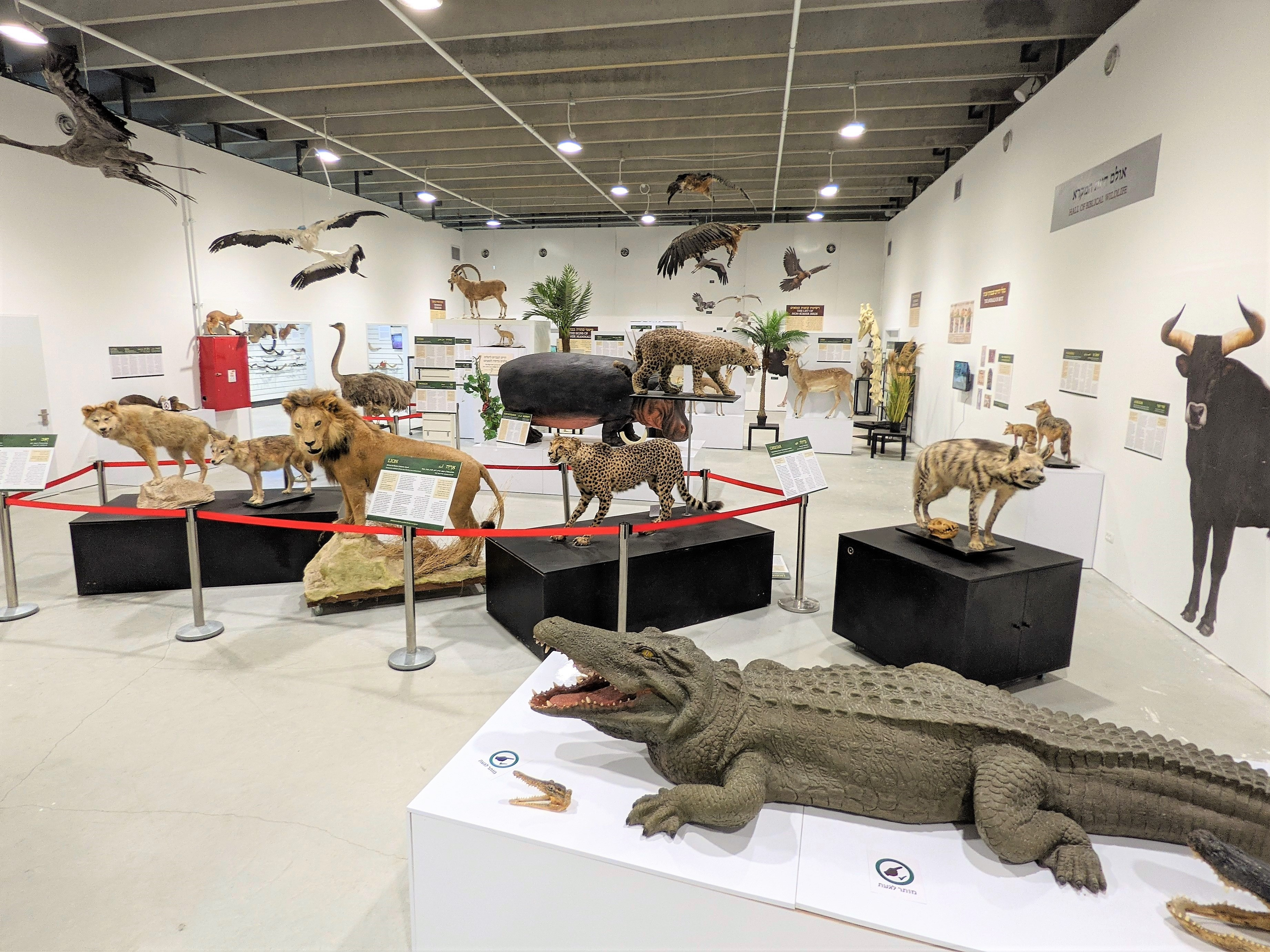

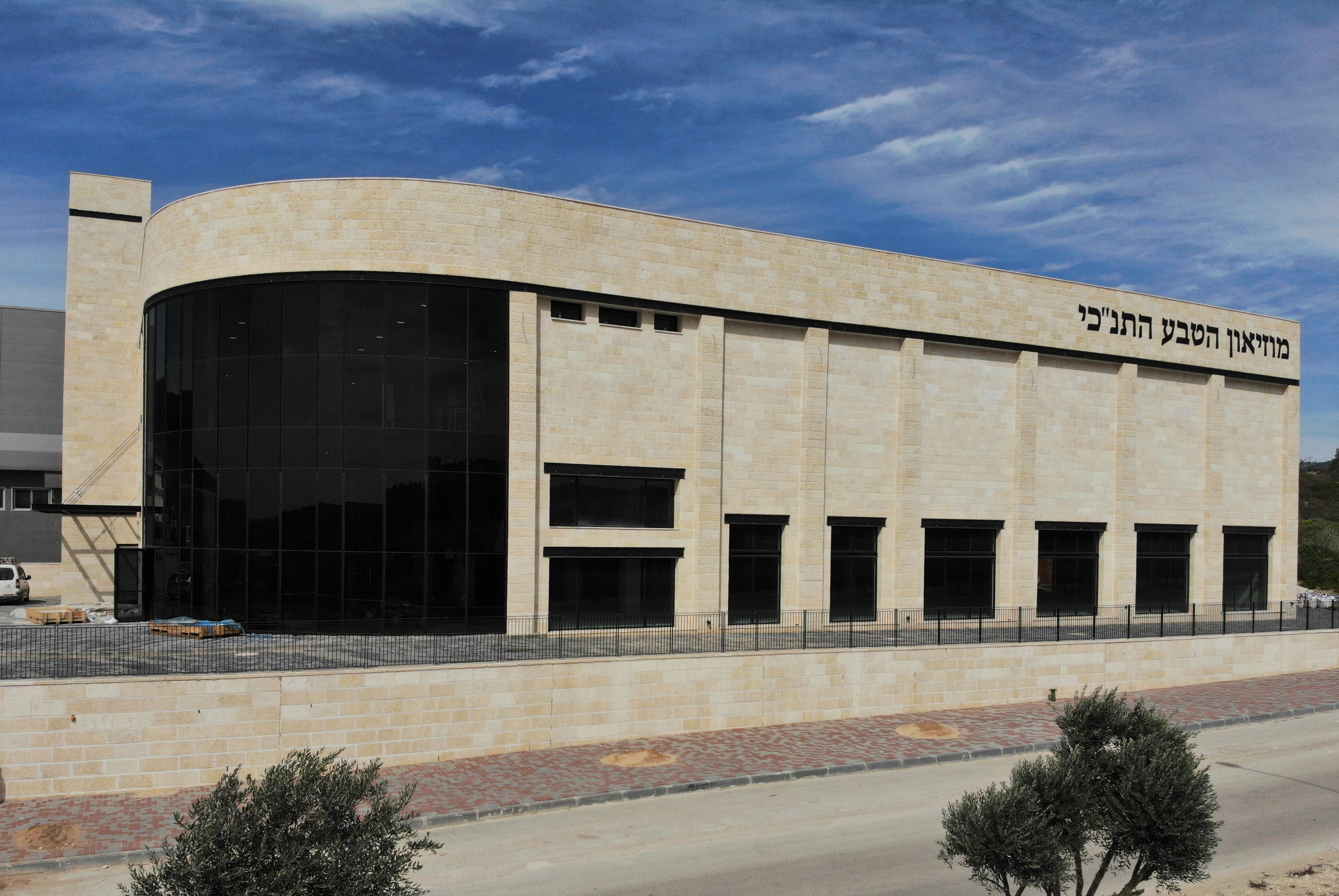

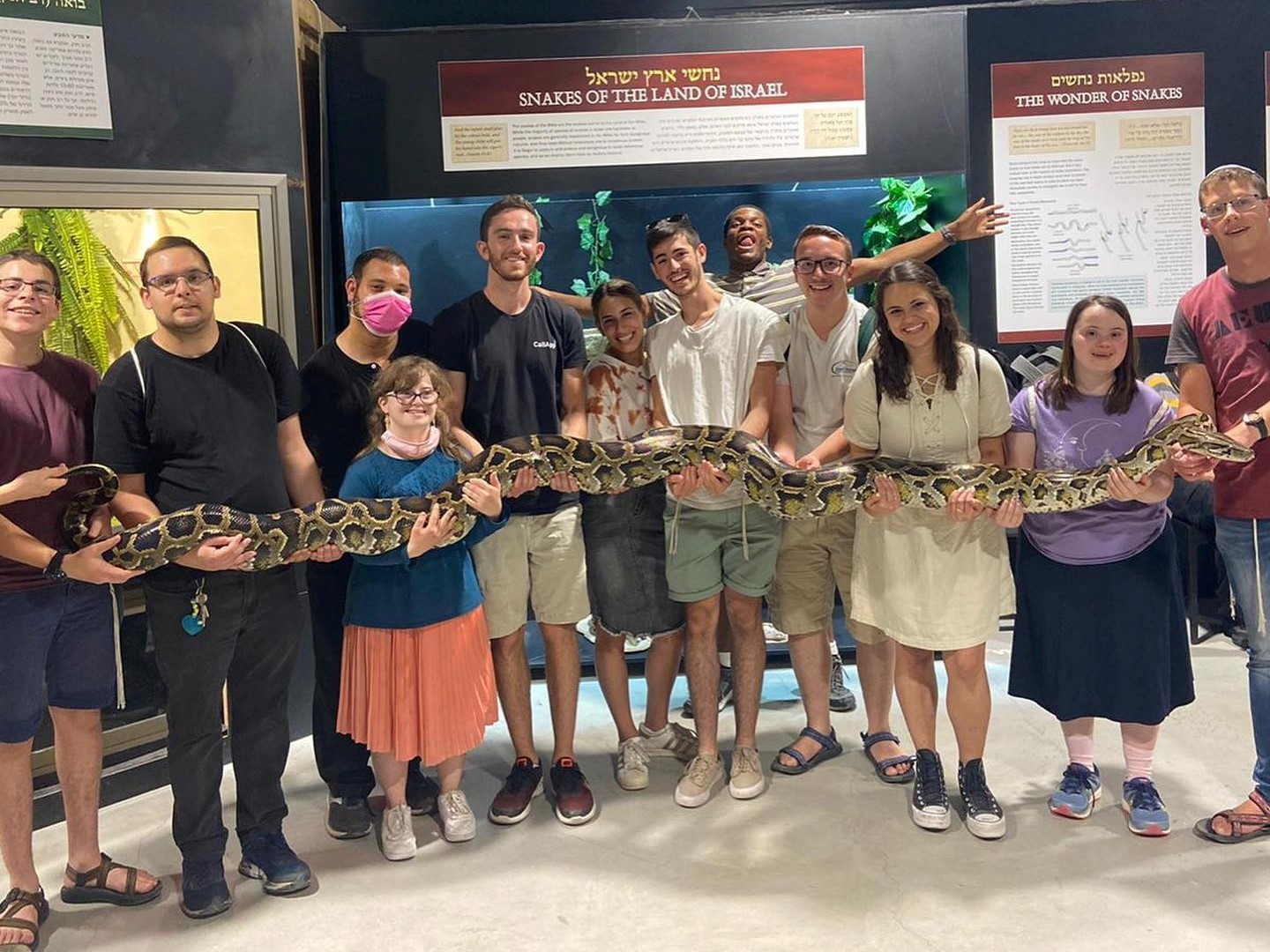

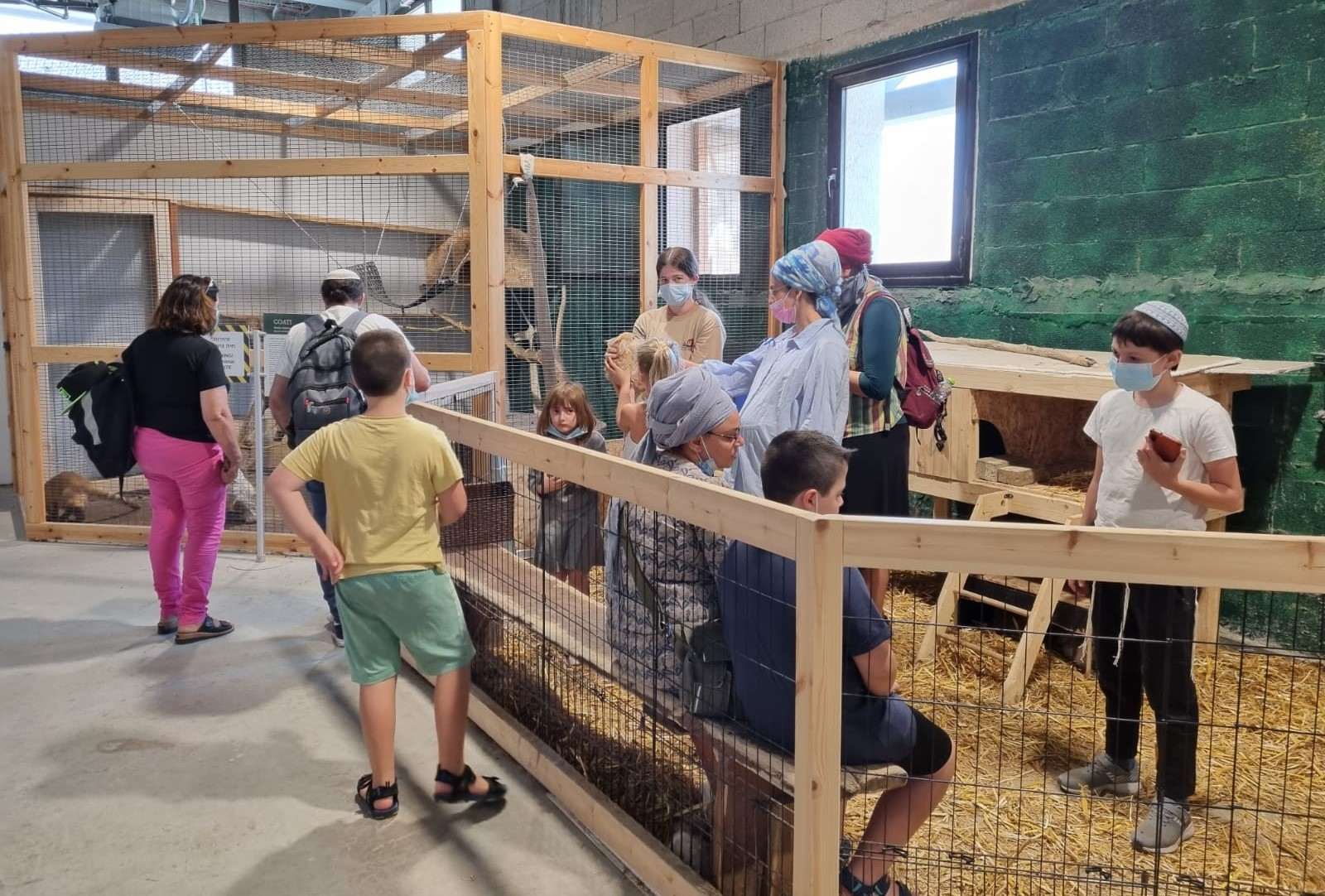

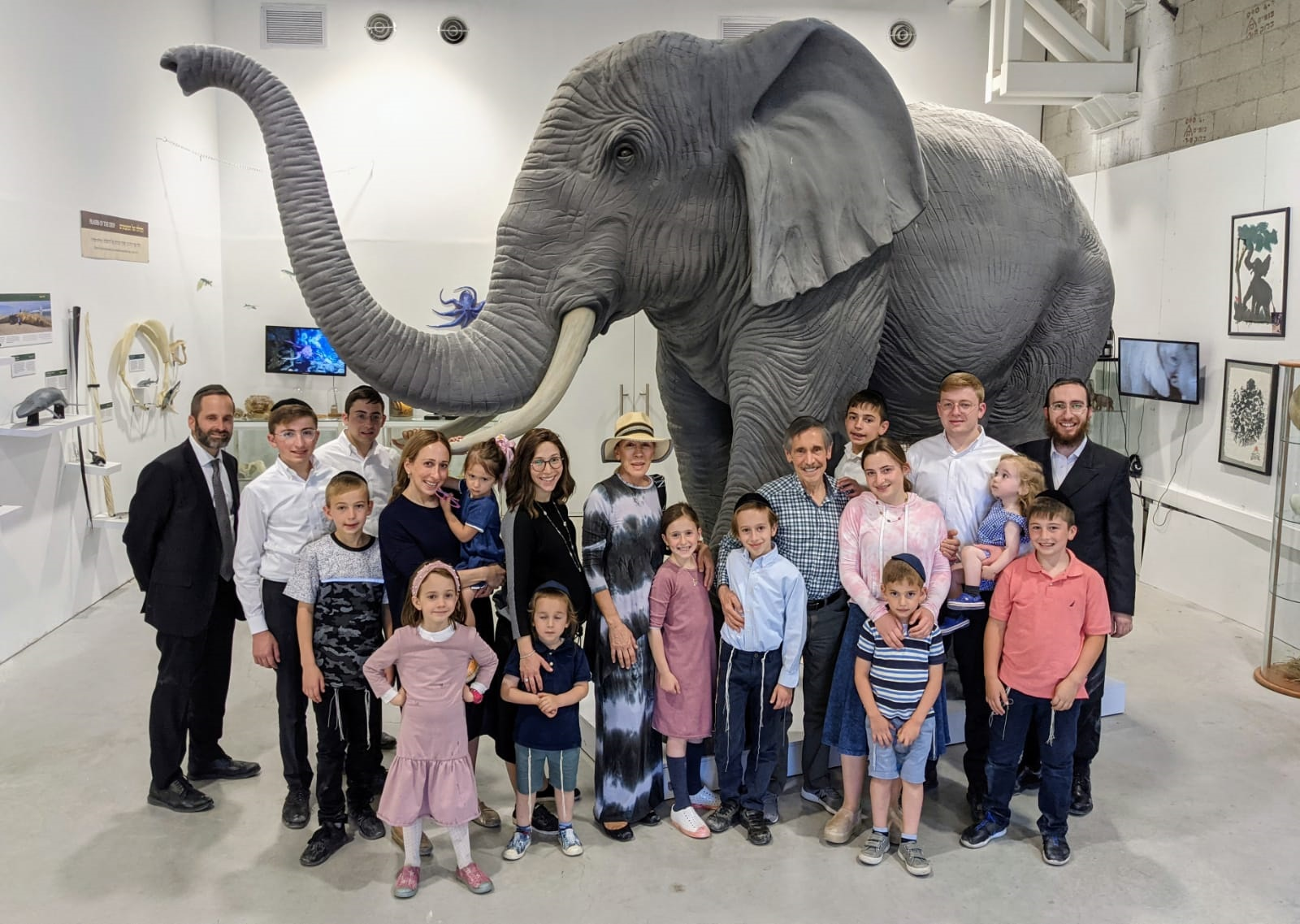

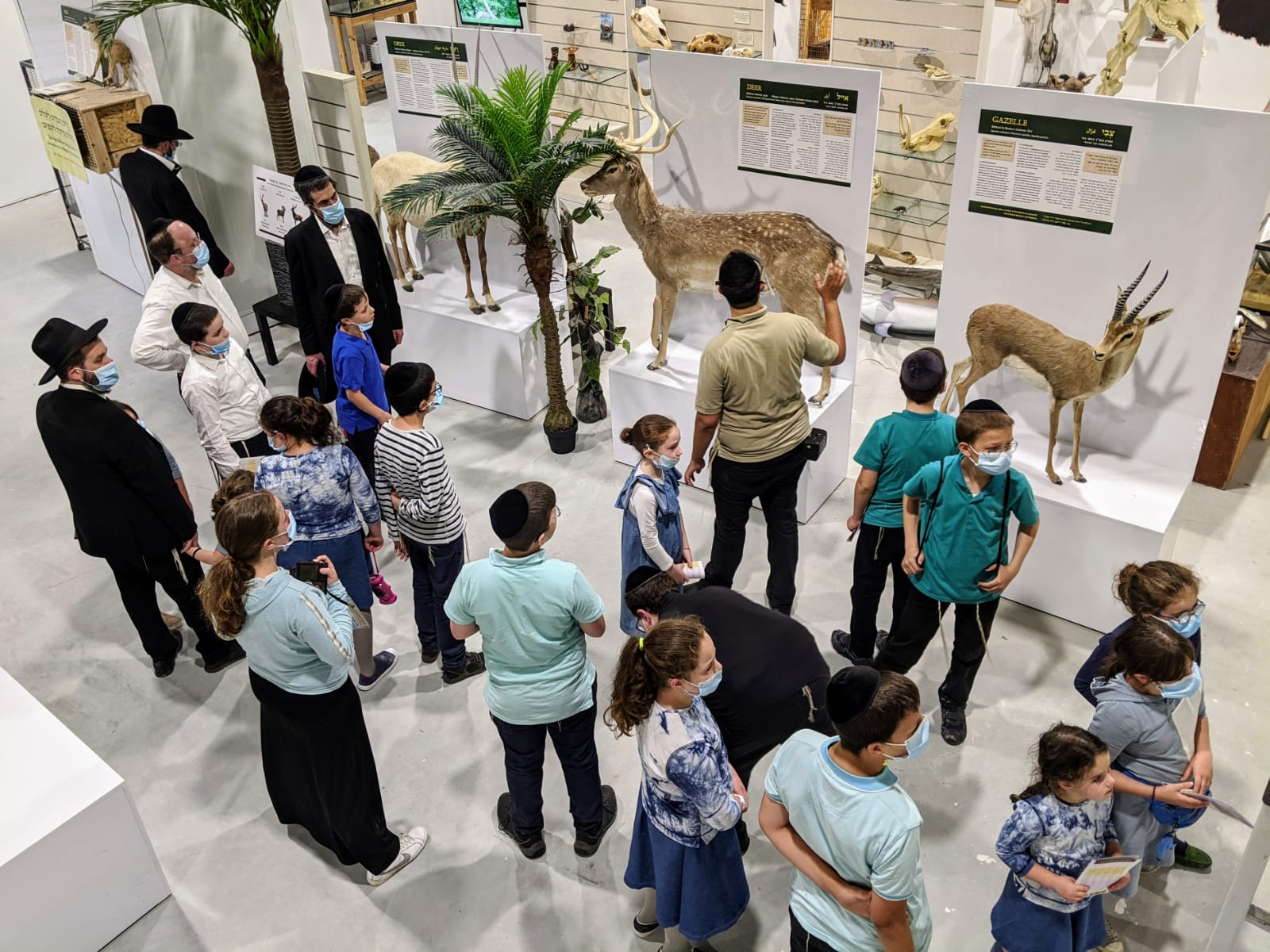

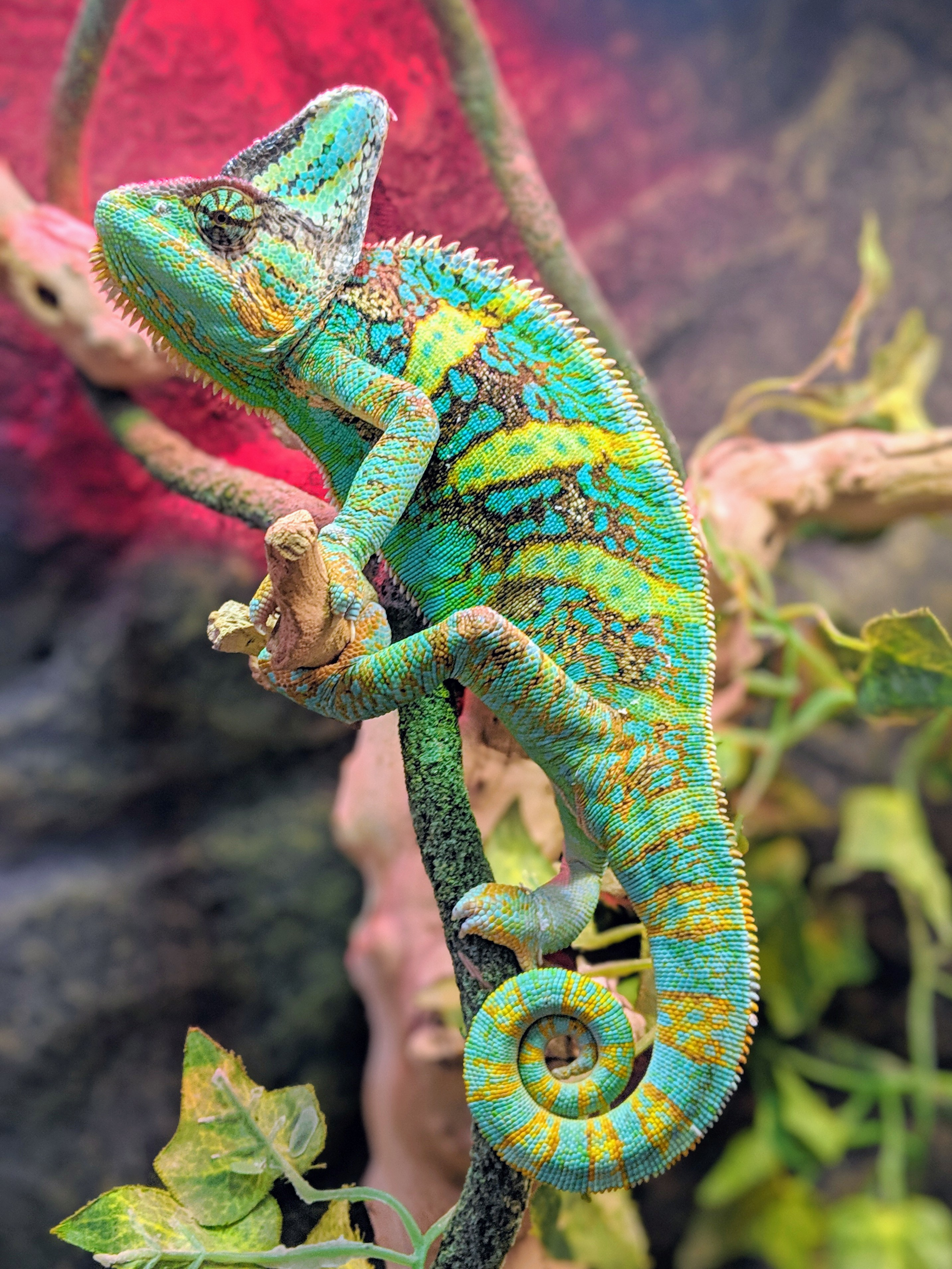

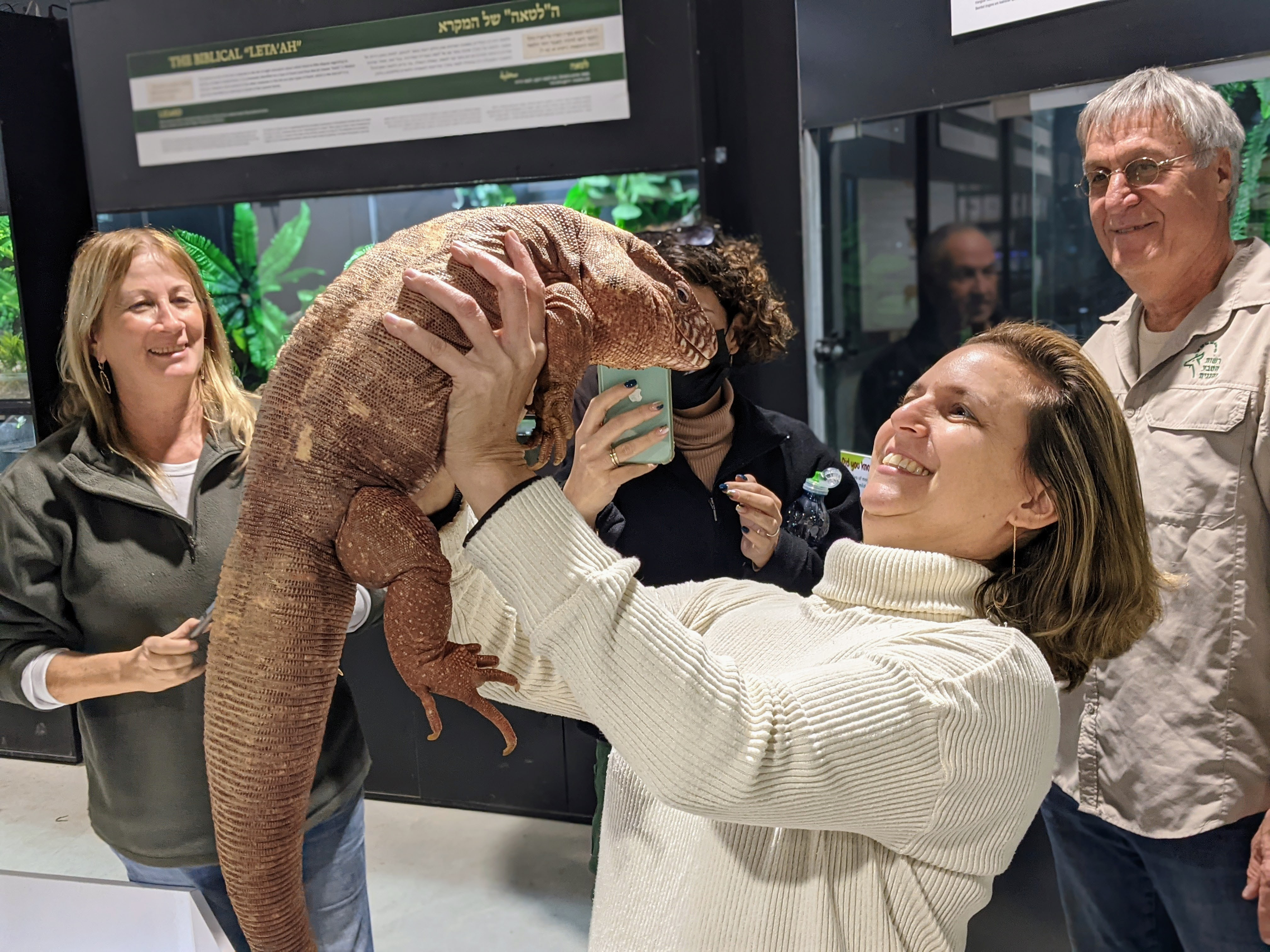

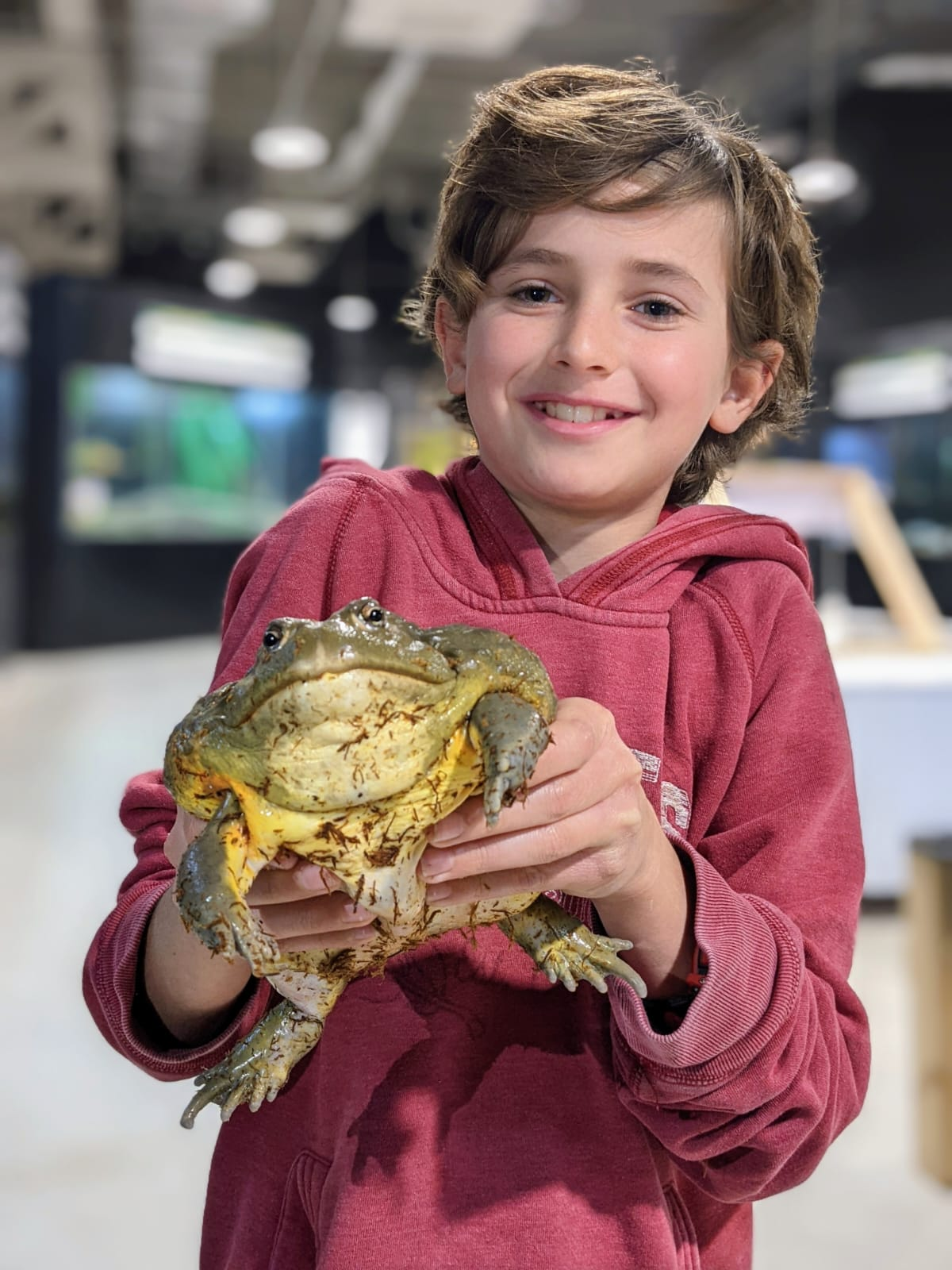
