= Hutzot HaYotzer =

Arts and crafts lane in Jerusalem, Israel

Coordinates: 31°46′30.81″N 35°13′34.25″E

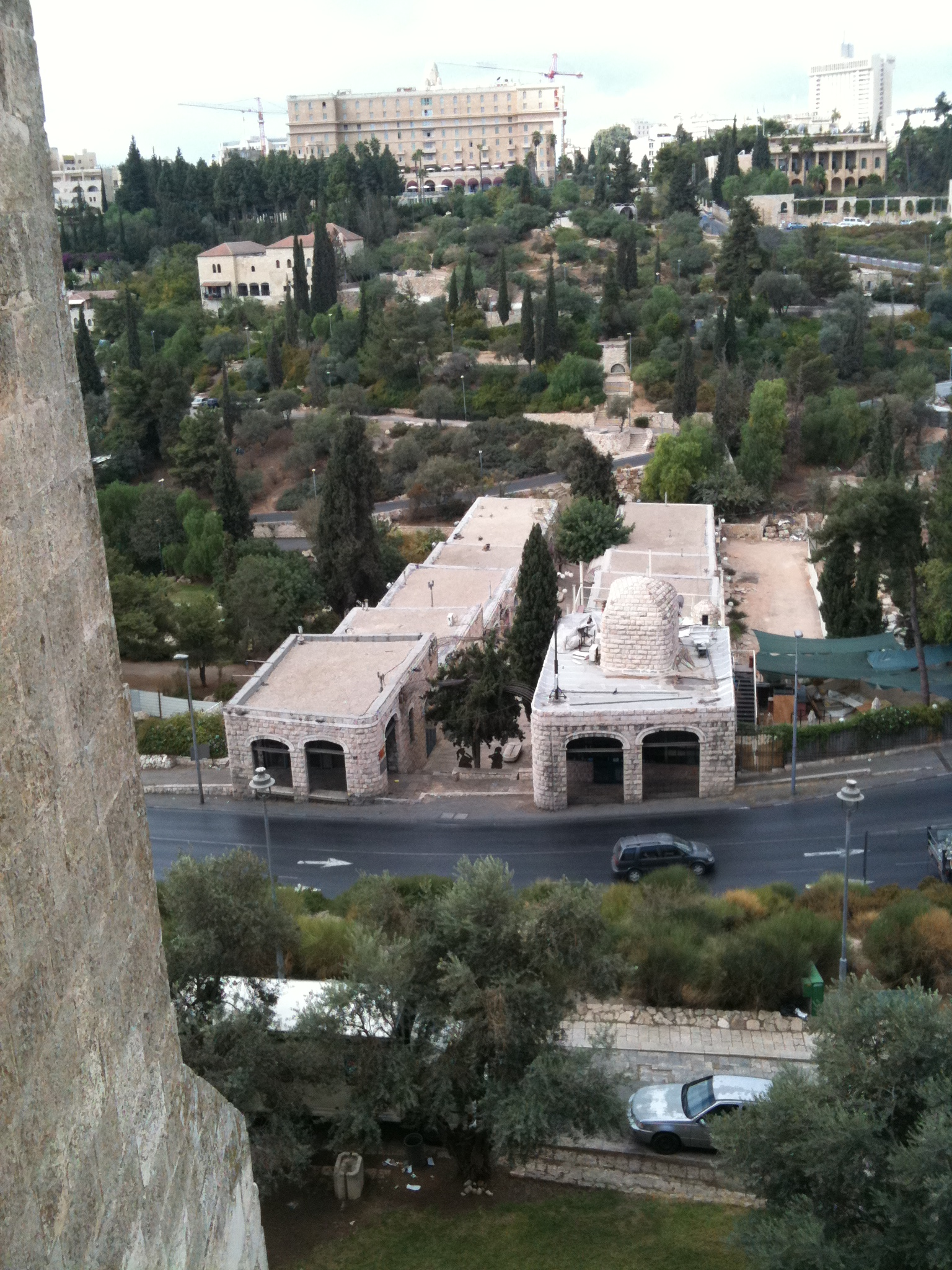
Artists' lane seen from above, from the Old City walls

Hutzot HaYotzer, known in English as the Artists' Colony, is an arts and crafts lane in Jerusalem, Israel, located west of the Old City walls.

== Etymology ==
Hutzot Hayotzer can be translated as "The Creator Steps Out", or alternatively from Hebrew and Aramaic as "the potter's section" (compound) or "the potter's hedge".

== Location ==
It is placed in the Valley of Hinnom between Yemin Moshe to the south, and David's Village (Kfar David in Hebrew) and the Mamilla Mall to the north. Other nearby landmarks are the Teddy Park (named after Mayor Teddy Kollek) and Sultan's Pool to the south.

== History ==
In biblical times, the land where Hutzot Hayotzer is located was part of the valley referred to in Biblical Hebrew as Gei ben-Hinnom or Gei ben-Hinnom, which later evolved into "Gehenna", an area used for worship rituals. In today's terms, it is placed within the north-south stretch of the Valley of Hinnom.

Between 1948 and 1967, the area was a no-man's land between the Jordanian-held Old City and the Israeli-held West Jerusalem.

Construction on the artists' colony began in 1969. In 2011, the artists' collective was threatened with eviction by the East Jerusalem Development Corporation, which owns the buildings. The eviction order was rescinded, but rents were raised.

Chef Moshe Basson's restaurant The Eucalyptus is located there.

== International Arts and Crafts Fair ==
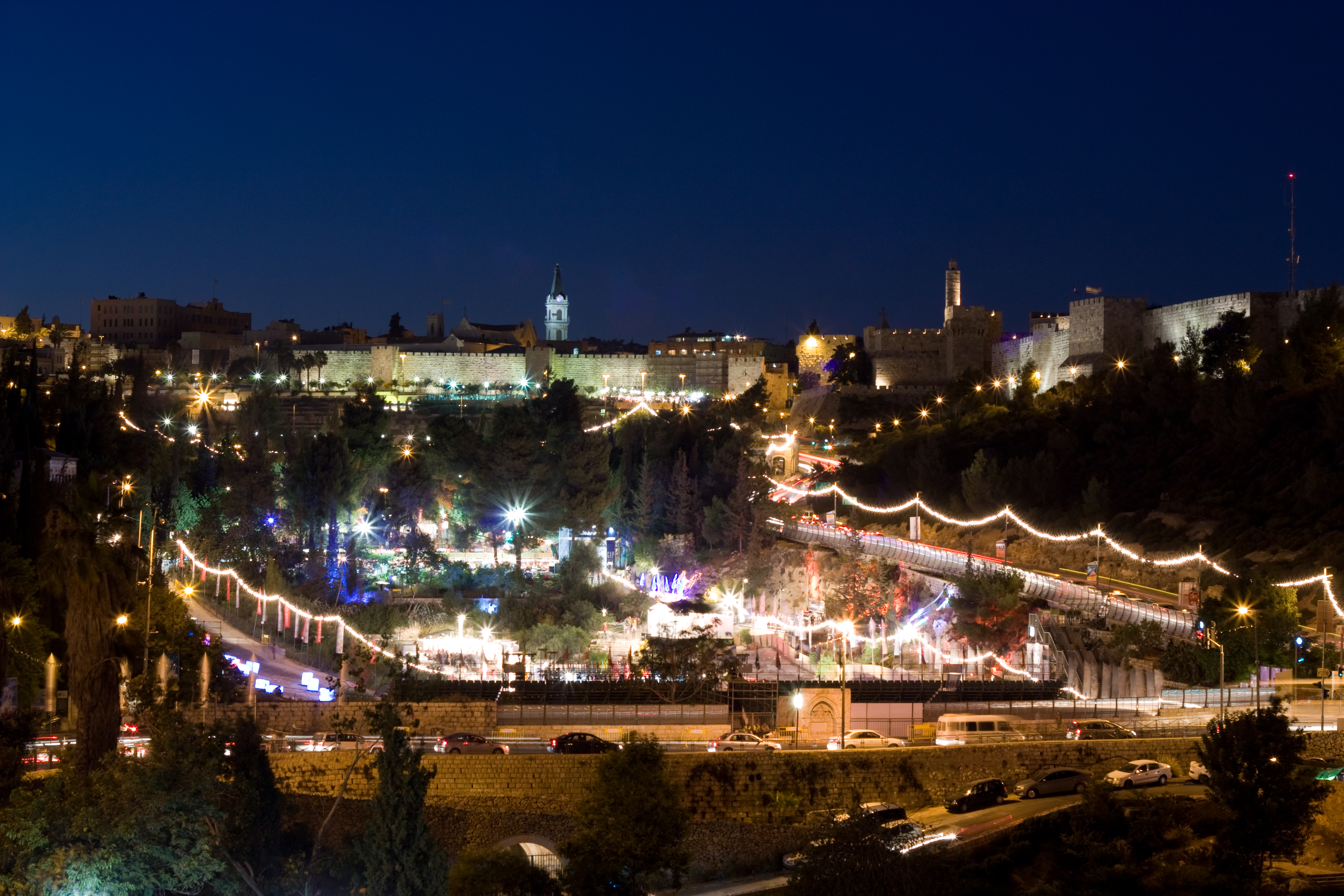
Hutzot Hayotzer arts and crafts festival with the Sultan's Pool in the foreground

Since 1976, Hutzot Hayotzer and the Sultan's Pool area have been the site of the annual International Arts and Crafts Fair or Festival, a 12-day event in August featuring the work of local and international artists. There are also open-air concerts, workshops for children and food booths. Many of Israel's leading pop and rock stars have performed at Hutzot Hayotzer During the festival, the artist studios along the lane stay open late and the artists offer public demonstrations of their work.

== See also ==
- Visual arts in Israel
- Music in Israel
- Tourism in Israel
