= Teddy Park (Jerusalem) =

Public park in Jerusalem, Israel

Teddy Kollek Park
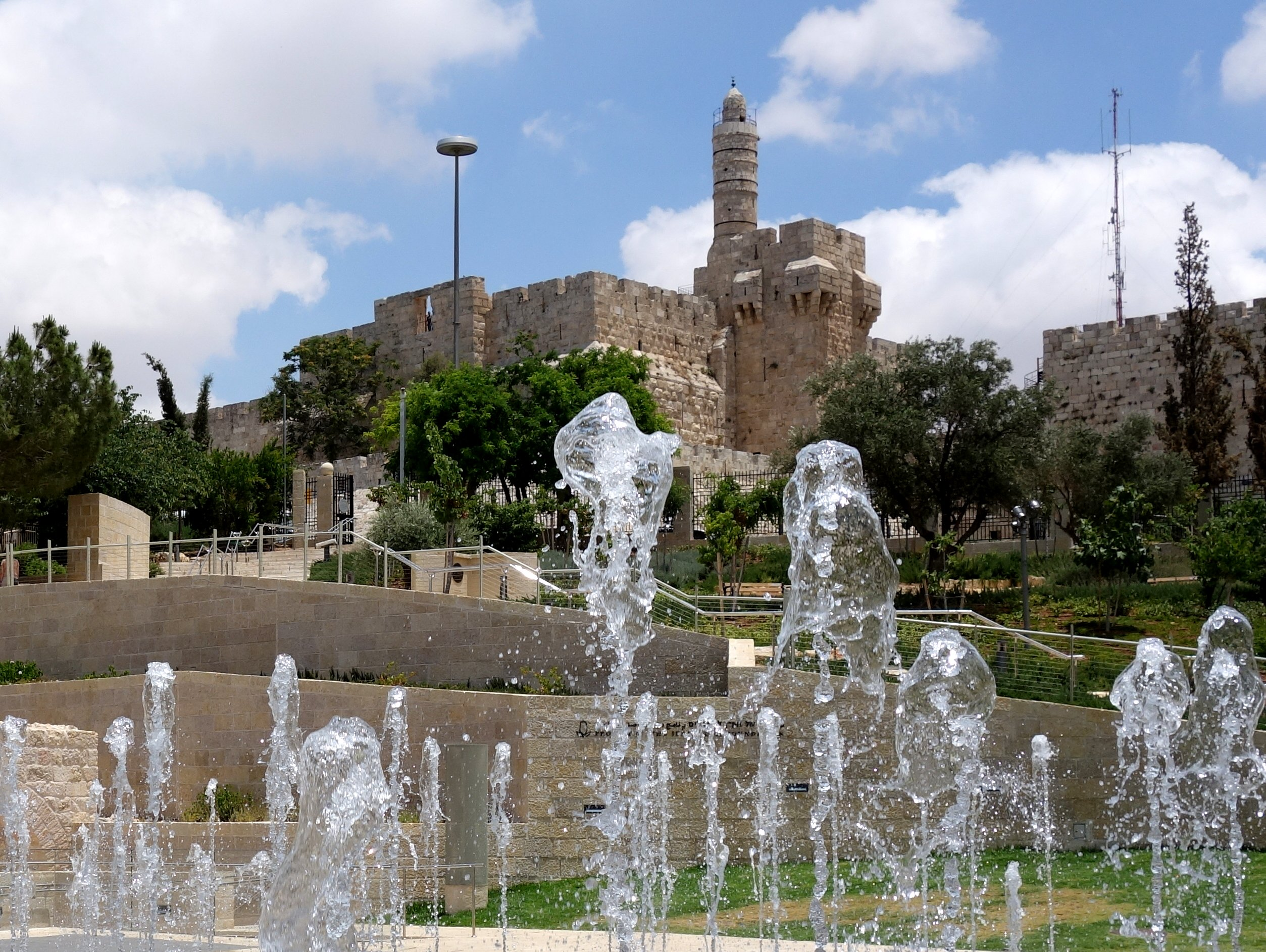
- Interactive map of Teddy Kollek Park
- Location: Jerusalem (Note: The political status of Jerusalem remains disputed. Both Israel and the State of Palestine claim as its capital although but a few countries recognized it as such but it is not recognized by the United Nations and other countries.)
- Coordinates: 31°46′32.1″N 35°13′35.7″E

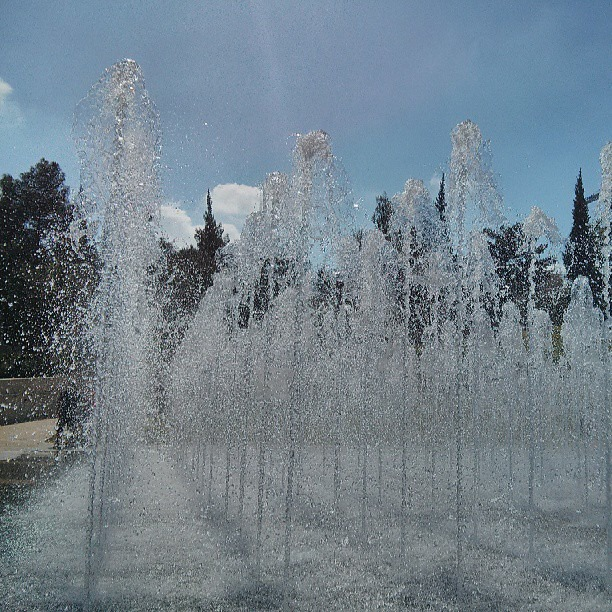
Teddy Fountain by daylight

Teddy Park, also known as Teddy Kollek Park, is a public park situated opposite Jerusalem's Old City and David's Citadel, and integrated with the Hutzot HaYotzer Artists complex in the Mitchell Parks & Gardens. The park was developed by the Jerusalem Foundation in memory of Jerusalem's long serving mayor, Teddy Kollek, and opened to the public in 2013.

== History ==
Before 1948, this area located just outside the walls of the Old City of Jerusalem was known as jawrat el-'enāb (Arabic: "vale of the jujube") due to the abundance of jujube trees found there, and served as an important communal meeting place for local merchants and residents. The comprehensive planning, design and supervision of the development of the park and its surroundings, including its structures, landscaping, water features, and the renovation of the Hutzot Hayotzer complex, was carried out by the office of Uri Shetrit Architects Ltd. together with A.I. Architecture and Urban Design (Isaac Halfon and Alan Aranoff architects).

A major feature of the park is its splash fountain that orchestrates animated water, sound and lighting. Journalist Linda Gradstein described it as a landscape of "spouting water geysers" just outside the walls of the Old City. Water shoots from the fountains in sync with music every 30 minutes; in the evening a light show plays while during the day children run among the water spouts. The music was composed by the New Jerusalem Orchestra and the East West Ensemble (Yisrael Borochov) incorporating themes from Jewish, Arab and African musical traditions. The fountain was donated by Alan Hassenfeld, philanthropist and former Hasbro Toys chairman. The fountain is noted as a place where people from every segment of Jerusalem's ethnically and religiously varied population mingle with visitors from around the globe. The water feature concept was developed by Stéphane Llorca of JML Consultants.

Teddy Park integrates with the landscaping immediately to its north, designed by Safdie Architects. During the construction process, antiquities were discovered on site that include: a Roman water cistern, remnants of the Roman 10th Legion, a Byzantine complex, and a 19th-century structure that was integrated into the design of the park itself by the architects.

The Hutzot Hayotzer complex houses a multimedia Visitor Center that contains an interactive exhibition of Teddy's story and the history of the development of the modern city.
