= Natan Slifkin =

British rabbi

Natan Slifkin נתן סליפקין
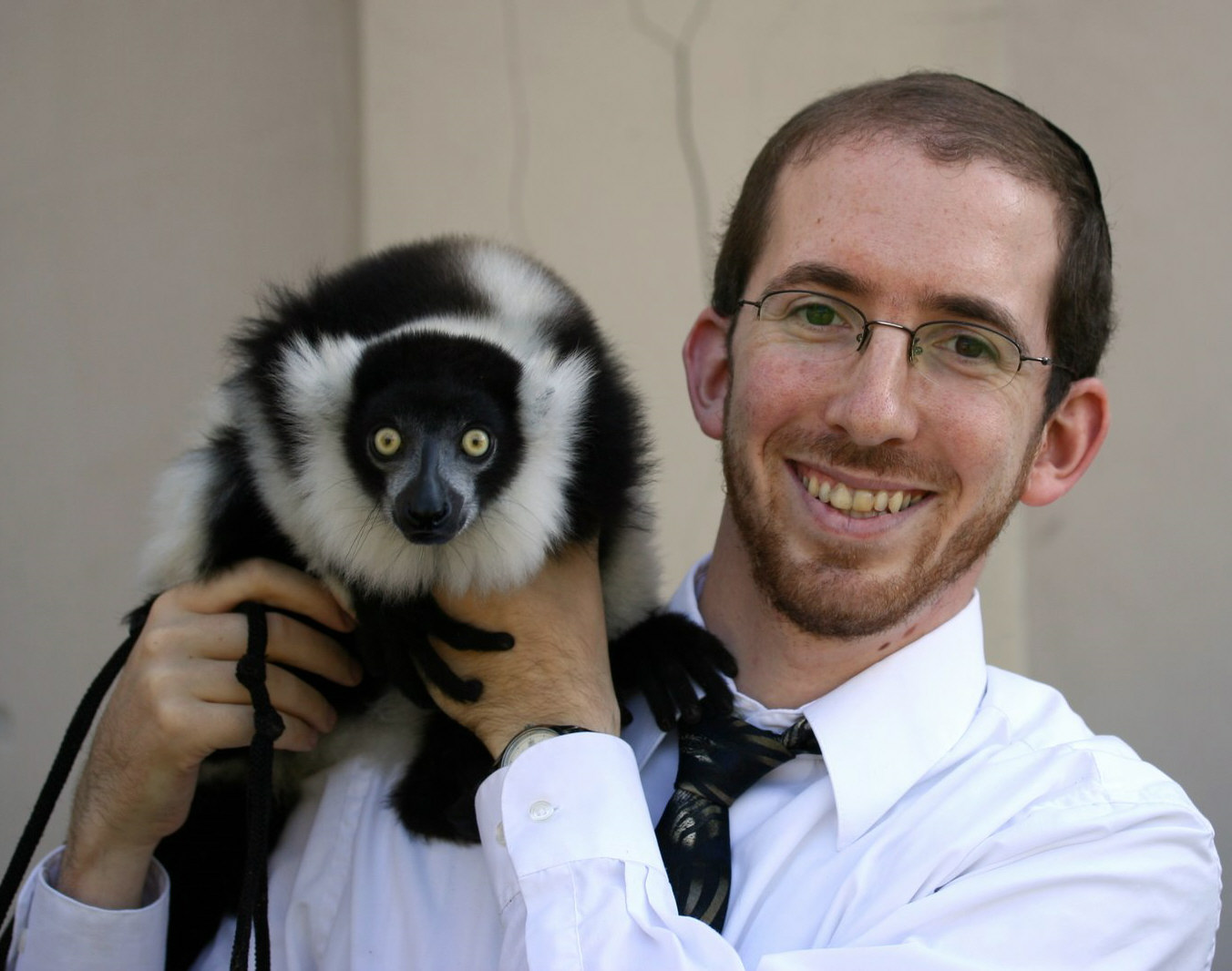
- Slifkin with a black-and-white ruffed lemur

Personal life
- Born: 25 June 1975 (age 51) Manchester, England
- Education: Bar-Ilan University

Religious life
- Religion: Judaism
- Denomination: Orthodox

Jewish leader
- Position: Director
- Organisation: Biblical Museum of Natural History
- Semikhah: Ohr Somayach

Natan Slifkin (also Nosson Slifkin) (Hebrew: נתן סליפקין; born 25 June 1975 in Manchester, England), popularly known as the "Zoo Rabbi", is a British born Israeli Orthodox Jewish rabbi, and the director of the Biblical Museum of Natural History in Beit Shemesh, Israel. Slifkin is best known for his interests in zoology, Judaism's relationship to evolution, Jewish and biblical history, and his writing on these topics.

== Biography ==
Slifkin was born and raised in Manchester, United Kingdom, where he studied at a local yeshiva called Yeshivas Shaarei Torah. He left in 1995 to continue his studies in the Medrash Shmuel yeshiva and Mir Yeshiva in Jerusalem, Israel. He was ordained at Ohr Somayach Institutions, where he taught Talmud and contemporary Judaism. He lives in Ramat Beit Shemesh, where he runs the Biblical Museum of Natural History. Slifkin has a master's degree in Judaic studies from the Lander Institute in Jerusalem, and a doctorate in Jewish history from Bar-Ilan University, completed in 2016. His dissertation was entitled: Rabbinic and Maskilic Encounters with Zoology in the Nineteenth Century.

== Controversy ==
Slifkin's books, which had "cautious references to evolutionary theory", led to a denunciation of his work by ultra-Orthodox authorities. One Rabbi who signed the ban, Elya Ber Wachtfogel, added that "even what is not heretical is expressed in a way only a heretic would speak". The ban led Slifkin's publisher to discontinue distribution of his books. Yashar Books, a smaller Jewish publisher, agreed to distribute them.

Moment magazine quoted an anonymous rabbi who said: "The Slifkin ban is a huge break. It's a kind of power struggle, and those who didn't sign the ban are outraged right now. I'm talking about rabbis with long white beards who are furious about it... He's saying out loud what a lot of people have been talking about quietly all along. To those people, he's a kind of figurehead."

Rabbis Aharon Feldman and Shlomo Miller wrote articles in defense of the ban, and Rabbi Moshe Meiselman gave three lectures on this topic at Toras Moshe. These defenses of the ban were themselves controversial, and Slifkin posted them all on his website, together with rebuttals written by various people. Meiselman requested that Slifkin remove the lectures from his website, but Slifkin did not. In 2013, Meiselman released a nearly 900-page book entitled "Torah, Chazal, and Science", which he stated "was in response to some recent controversies surrounding issues of Torah and science. A spate of books ... have attempted to introduce a radical new theology and proclaim it compatible with classic Jewish belief." Rabbi Chaim Malinowitz broke with his Haredi colleagues in not seeking a ban on Slifkin's books.

On 5 October 2008, Slifkin published an essay entitled, In Defense of My Opponents, in which he says that there is a reasonable basis for a ban on his books in certain communities.

== Published works ==
- The Lions of Zion: Biblical Natural History and the Significance of Israel (Biblical Museum of Natural History 2025) ISBN 9798893262971
- The Science of Torah: The Reflection of Torah in the Laws of Science, The Creation of the Universe and the Development of Life (Targum Press 2001) ISBN 1-56871-288-X. Later republished in a revised and expanded edition as The Challenge of Creation: Judaism's Encounter with Science, Cosmology and Evolution (Zoo Torah/Yashar Books 2006) ISBN 1-933143-15-0
- Mysterious Creatures (Targum Press 2003) ISBN 1-56871-248-0. Republished in a revised and expanded edition as Sacred Monsters: Mysterious and Mythical Creatures of Scripture, Talmud and Midrash (Zoo Torah/Yashar Books 2006) ISBN 1-933143-18-5
- The Camel, the Hare and the Hyrax: A Study of the Laws of Animals with One Kosher Sign in Light of Modern Zoology (Targum Press 2004) ISBN 1-56871-312-6. Republished with corrections in 2011.
- Lying for Truth: Understanding Yaakov's Deception of Yitzchak (Targum Press 1998) ISBN 1-56871-106-9
- Second Focus: Original and Stimulating Essays on Jewish Thought (Targum Press 1999) ISBN 1-56871-176-X
- In Noah's Footsteps: Biblical Perspectives on the Zoo (The Tisch Family Zoological Gardens 2000)
- Nature's Song: An Elucidation of Perek Shirah, the Ancient Text that Lists the Philosophical and Ethical Lessons of the Natural World (Targum Press 2001) ISBN 1-56871-274-X. Republished in 2009.
- Man and Beast: Our Relationship with Animals in Jewish Law and Thought (Zoo Torah/Yashar Books 2006) ISBN 1-933143-06-1
- The Torah Encyclopedia of the Animal Kingdom (Maggid 2015) ISBN 1-59264-404-X
- Rationalism Vs. Mysticism: Schisms in Traditional Jewish Thought (Gefen 2021) ISBN 9657023629

Slifkin writes a blog called "Rationalist Judaism", in which he promulgates his opinions on Jewish thought. He has also published e-books on many of his topics of interest.

== See also ==
- Jewish views on evolution
- Omphalos hypothesis
