= Moshe Basson =

Israeli chef (born 1950)

- משה בסון
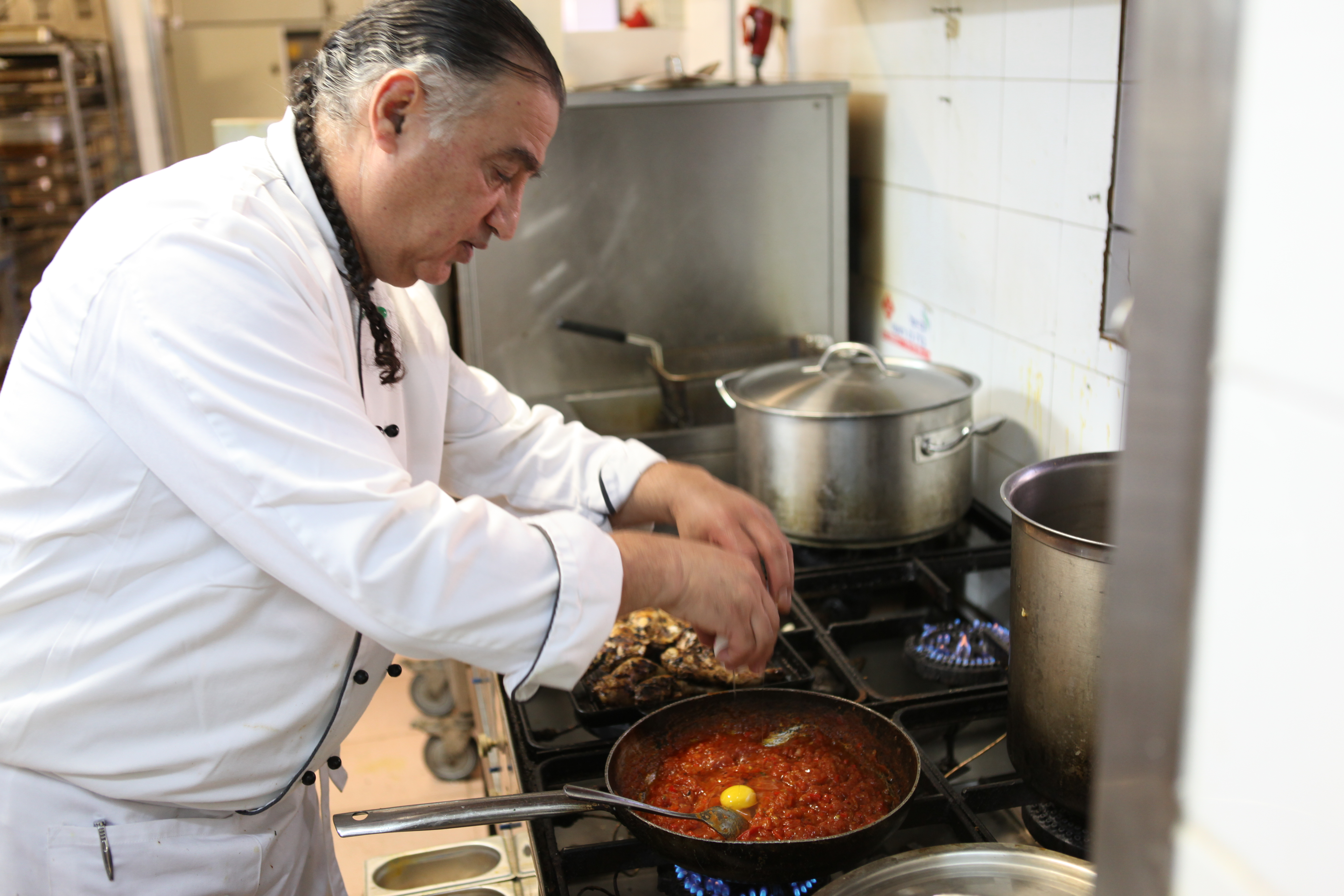
- Basson cooking in his restaurant, The Eucalyptus
- Born: 1950 (age 75–76); Iraq
- Occupations: Chef, restaurateur
- Years active: 1988—present
- Employer: The Eucalyptus restaurant
- Known for: Traditional regional cooking, biblical ingredients, use of wild plants and herbs

Moshe Basson (Hebrew: משה בסון; born 1950) is an Israeli chef, restaurateur, and food folklorist. An early proponent of the Slow Food movement in Israel, he is the owner and head chef of The Eucalyptus restaurant in Jerusalem. He specializes in traditional regional cuisine, biblical ingredients, and the use of wild plants and herbs that he gathers himself on foraging expeditions in the Jerusalem hills. He is a member of the Israeli-Palestinian group Chefs for Peace and a two-time winner of the international Couscous Fest in Italy.

== Early life ==
Moshe Basson was born in Iraq in 1950. His mother Esperanza and her family were natives of Amarah. He immigrated to Israel with his family when he was nine months old. The family was assigned to a refugee absorption camp in the Talpiot neighborhood of Jerusalem. Arriving in 1951 during the Passover holiday, they were allocated a 7-square-metre (75 sq ft) shack with corrugated tin walls and no floor. Utilities in the neighborhood initially consisted of a public water tap where refugees stood in line to fill pails with water, and communal latrines.

The family eventually moved to a 16-square-metre (170 sq ft) stone house with a garden. Basson's parents opened a small bakery in the Arab neighborhood of Beit Safafa. They also cultivated a vegetable garden and raised chickens to supplement their government food rations. In the early 1960s, Moshe planted a eucalyptus seedling in the family's vegetable garden.

While serving in the Israeli army, he attended Tadmore, the government hospitality school.

== Cooking career ==
Twenty-five years after the planting of the eucalyptus tree, Basson's brother Ya'acov built a restaurant around the tree, with the bole standing in the middle of the dining room and the branches extending above the roof. Moshe became cook and subsequently manager. The menu was originally geared to working people, but Moshe began incorporating wild edible roots and plants that he gathered in the surrounding fields, and emphasizing seasonal produce. Soon the restaurant began attracting a foodie crowd.

When the property was slated for urban renewal, Moshe closed the restaurant and embarked on six months of travel and food tasting in Cyprus, Turkey, Thailand, and Africa. Upon his return, he opened a new restaurant at 7 Hyrcanus Street in downtown Jerusalem. Four years later, he moved to an address in Safra Square. He made the restaurant kosher in 1997 after his father's death. The restaurant closed during the Second Intifada in 2002 due to a wave of terrorist attacks on civilian targets that led Israelis to be reluctant to dine out until the construction of the Israeli West Bank barrier. In 2004 Basson co-founded Carmei Ha'ir, a charity restaurant that served midday meals with the sort of food and table service found at nice restaurants, but allowed customers to pay what they could afford.

The Eucalyptus reopened in 2007 back on Hyrcanus Street. As of 2015, the restaurant is in Hutzot Hayotzer opposite the Walls of Jerusalem.

== Cooking style ==
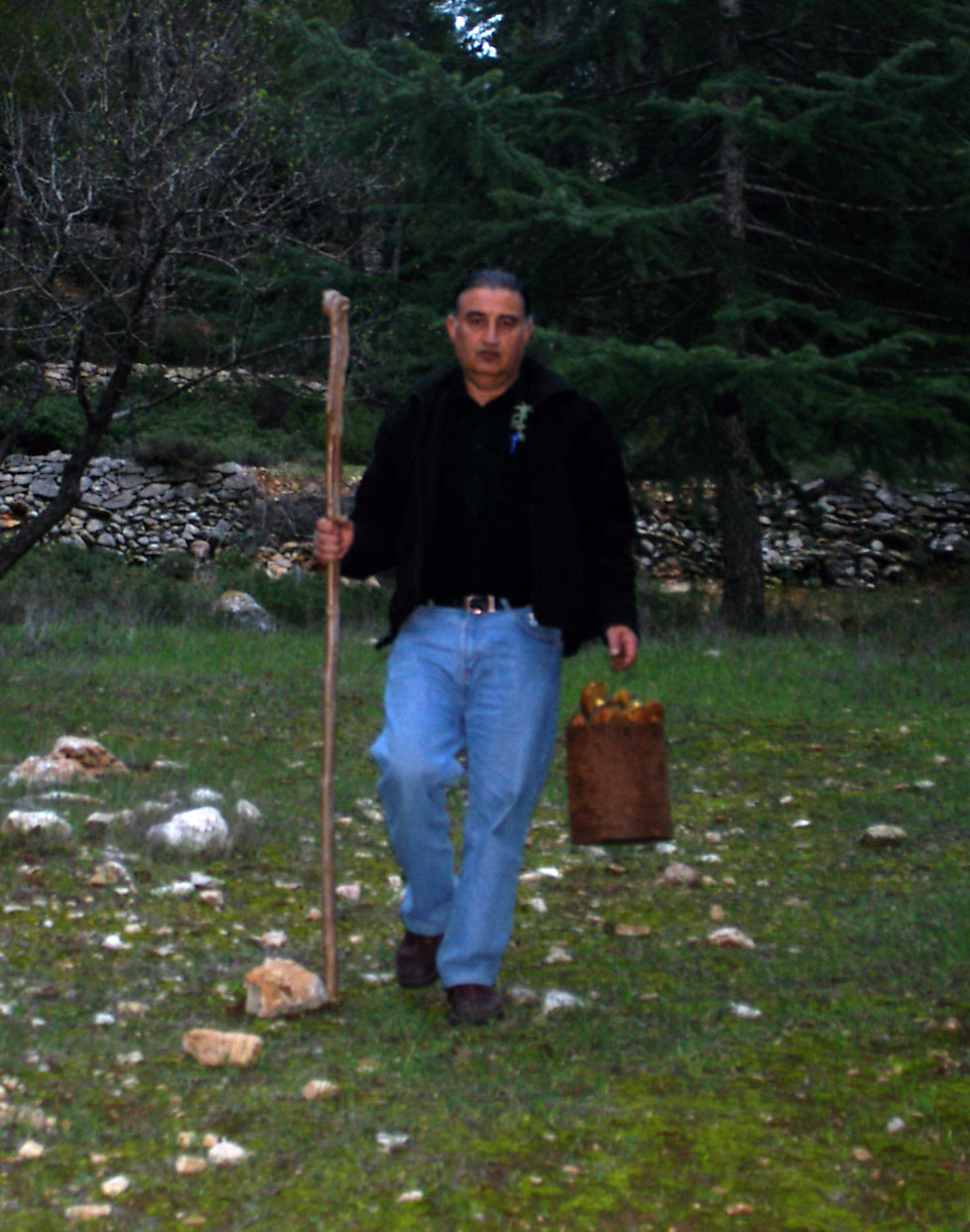
Basson collects wild mushrooms in the Jerusalem Forest

Basson specializes in Levantine, Arab, and Jewish cuisine. He is known for his contemporary interpretations of traditional cuisine and the use of biblical ingredients, including the Seven Species.

Basson liberally uses regional flavouring herbs, such as hyssop and za'atar. He often goes out to forage in the Jerusalem hills for wild plants to add to his soups, stews, and stuffed vegetables – including wild chicory, mallow, Jerusalem sage, purslane, lemon verbena, sumac, and wild cyclamen. Basson said he learned about edible roots and plants from the Arab women who patronized his parents' bakery in his youth, and from Arab farmers who sold wild greens by Damascus Gate.

Among Basson's specialties are chicken-stuffed figs cooked in a sweet-and-sour tamarind sauce, dolmas wrapped in mallow or wild cyclamen, Jerusalem artichoke soup, local game such as pheasant and quail, and fresh figs dipped in date syrup and tehina. His homemade focaccia is served with a selection of herbed spreads. His signature dish is maqluba, a slow-cooked stew of rice, vegetables, and chicken which is flipped upside-down from the pot to serve. Basson often involves diners in the "flipping ceremony" at tableside.

Basson was an early proponent of the Slow Food movement in Israel. In 2009 he was a co-sponsor of International Slow Food Day/Terra Madre Day in Israel, with separate events for adults and schoolchildren.

== Other activities ==
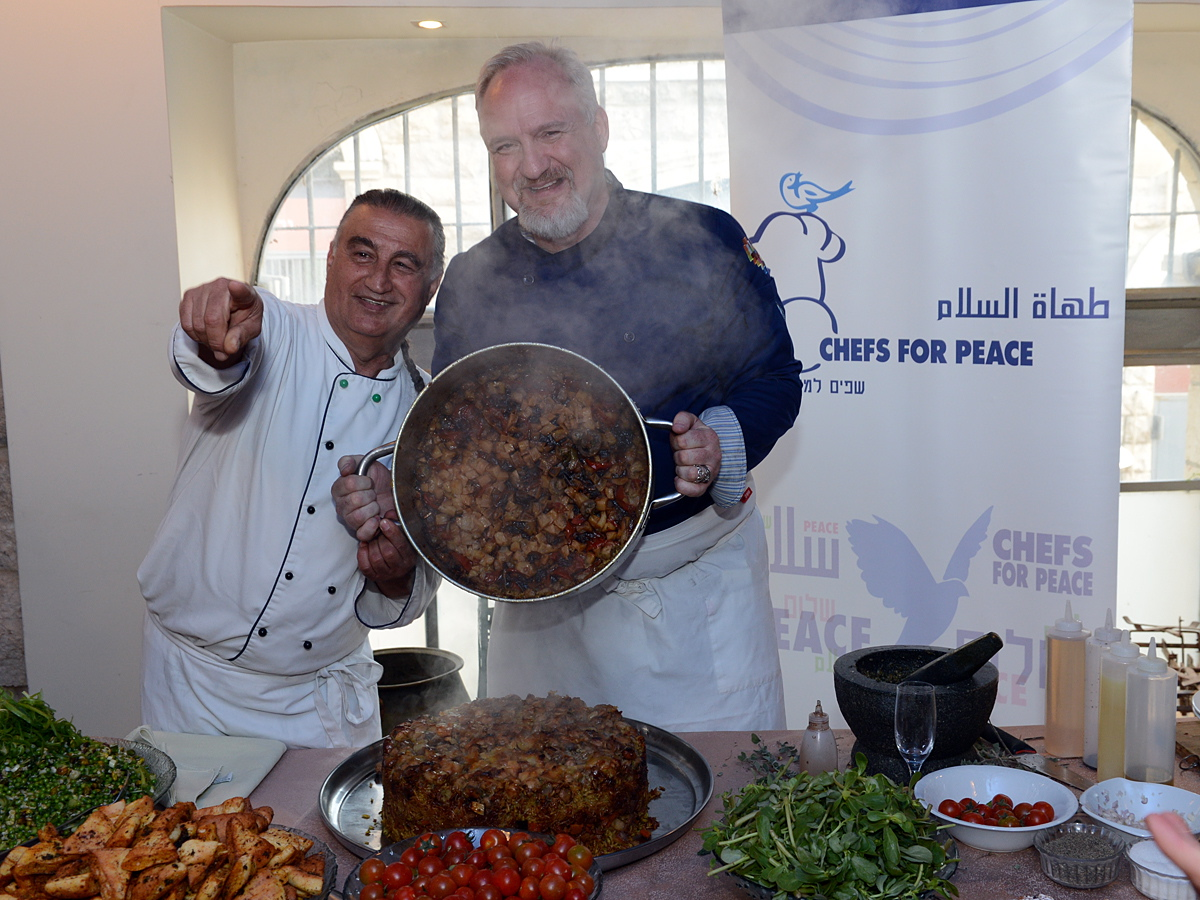
Basson (left) with US celebrity chef Art Smith at a 2013 Chefs for Peace event in The Eucalyptus

Basson teaches cooking classes and gives cooking demonstrations. He has given cooking demonstrations in Israeli embassies in various countries. In 1998, he was invited to present a cooking demonstration and prepare dinner for guests at the Kennedy Center in Washington, D.C., on the occasion of Israel's 50th Independence Day. He had planned to forage for mallow in fields around the district but was unable to locate any of the wild plant; in the end, several kilos of the plant had to be flown in from California.

Basson is a member of Chefs for Peace, a joint organization for Israeli and Palestinian chefs.

== Honors and awards ==
In 1999 Basson was encouraged by the Israeli cultural attaché to Italy to compete in the international Couscous Fest in Sicily. Basson won first prize for his innovative presentation called "Manna from the Sky", incorporating fried eggplant, stuffed fish, sauce and garnish. He has since won the competition a second time.

== Personal life ==
Basson and his wife, who is of Austro-Hungarian descent, have three children. Their son Ronny, also a chef, works at The Eucalyptus.
