= The Eucalyptus =

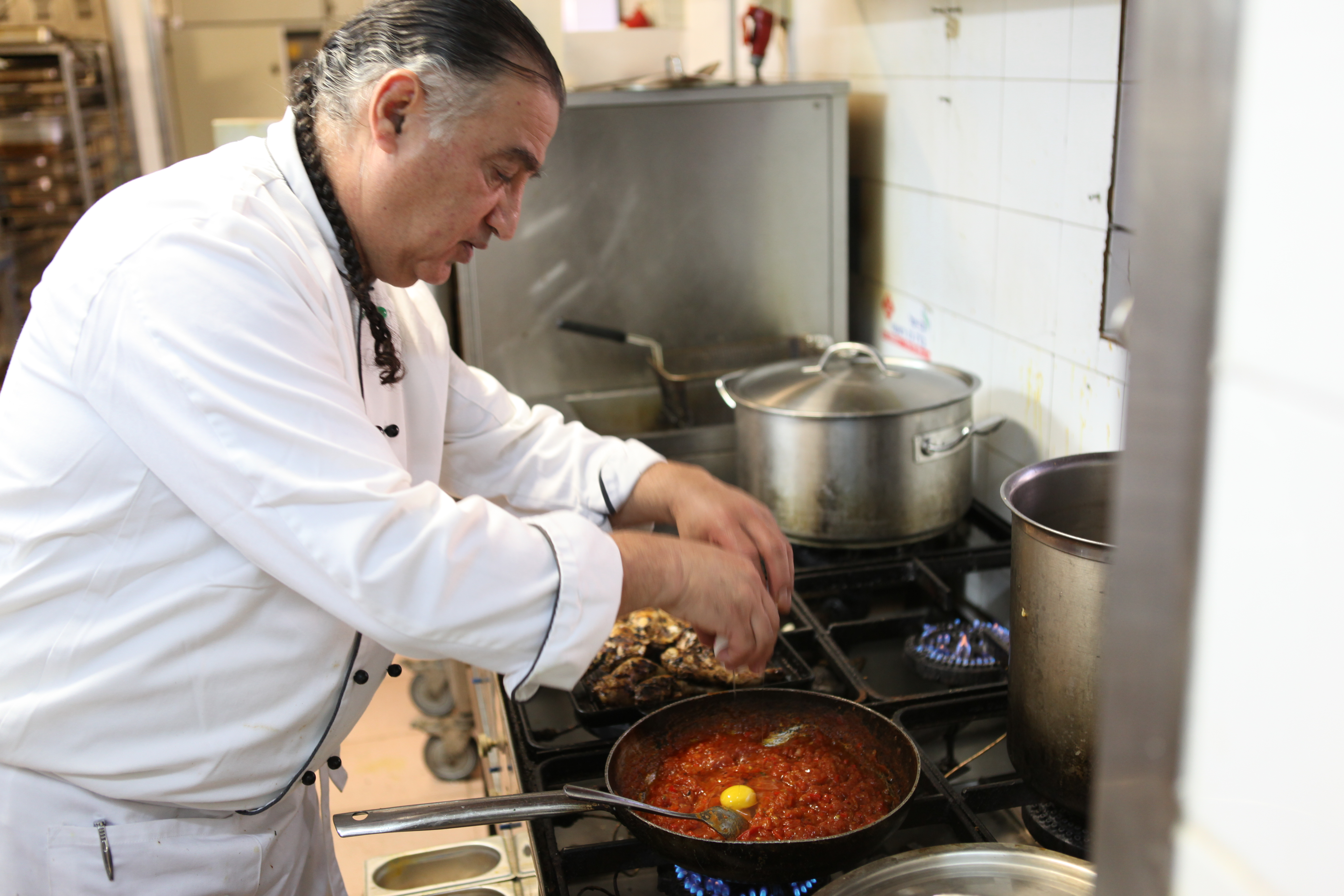
- Chef Moshe Basson cooking in his restaurant
- Interactive map of The Eucalyptus

Restaurant information
- Established: Mid-1980s
- Chef: Moshe Basson
- Location: Jerusalem, Israel
- Coordinates: 31°46′29″N 35°13′36″E
- Website: the-eucalyptus.com

The Eucalyptus (Hebrew: האקליפטוס) is a Jerusalem fine dining restaurant. It is noted for its use of biblical ingredients and the use of wild plants and roots foraged from the nearby hillsides, and for preparing traditional and innovative Levantine, Arab, and Jewish cuisine.

== History ==
The Eucalyptus was founded by Moshe Basson, a native of Iraq who moved to Israel with his family as a refugee when he was an infant. Basson's parents owned a bakery in Jerusalem's Beit Safafa neighborhood, and cultivated a vegetable garden and raised chickens to supplement their government food rations. In the early 1960s Moshe planted a eucalyptus seedling in the garden. Twenty-five years later his brother Ya'acov built a restaurant around the tree, with the bole standing in the middle of the dining room and the branches extending above the roof. He brought in Moshe as the cook, and Moshe soon took over the place. Like the bakery Basson's father had owned, the restaurant initially catered to working people. The tables were covered with red-checked oilcloth that could be wiped clean rather than laundered. When Basson started flavoring his cooking with wild edible roots and plants that he gathered in the surrounding fields, the restaurant began attracting a foodie crowd.

Basson closed the restaurant when he heard that the city was planning to redevelop the site into a shopping center, and traveled abroad to sample the cuisines of Cyprus, Turkey, Thailand, and Africa. According to The Jerusalem Post, The Eucalyptus was "an underground Jerusalem institution [that] has long been a place of pilgrimage for visiting food writers and other enthusiasts of the gastronomic experience", and when it closed, "there was mourning in the culinary community".

Upon his return, Basson reopened The Eucalyptus in a new location at 7 Hyrcanus Street in downtown Jerusalem, which was part of a growing Israeli food scene. Four years later, he moved the eatery to an address in Safra Square. He made the restaurant kosher in 1997 after his father's death. He was forced to close the restaurant again during the Second Intifada in 2002 due to a drop-off in tourism, but reopened in 2008 back on Hyrcanus Street. As of 2015, the restaurant is located in Hutzot Hayotzer opposite the Walls of Jerusalem.

After training in Peru with chef Gastón Acurio, Basson's son began to work with him at The Eucalyptus.

== Cuisine ==
The Eucalyptus promotes the Israeli food trend emphasizing biblical ingredients, including the Seven Species. "Wheat, barley, grapes, figs, pomegranates, olive oil, and date honey" are all regularly used in dishes. Basson has extensively researched biblical food preparation and eating traditions as well. In addition, Basson personally forages for wild ingredients growing on the nearby Jerusalem hills, including wild chicory, mallow, sage, purslane, lemon verbena, and other edible plants. Instead of stuffed grape leaves, for example, the restaurant offers stuffed Jerusalem sage, mulberry leaves, cyclamen leaves, and mallow.

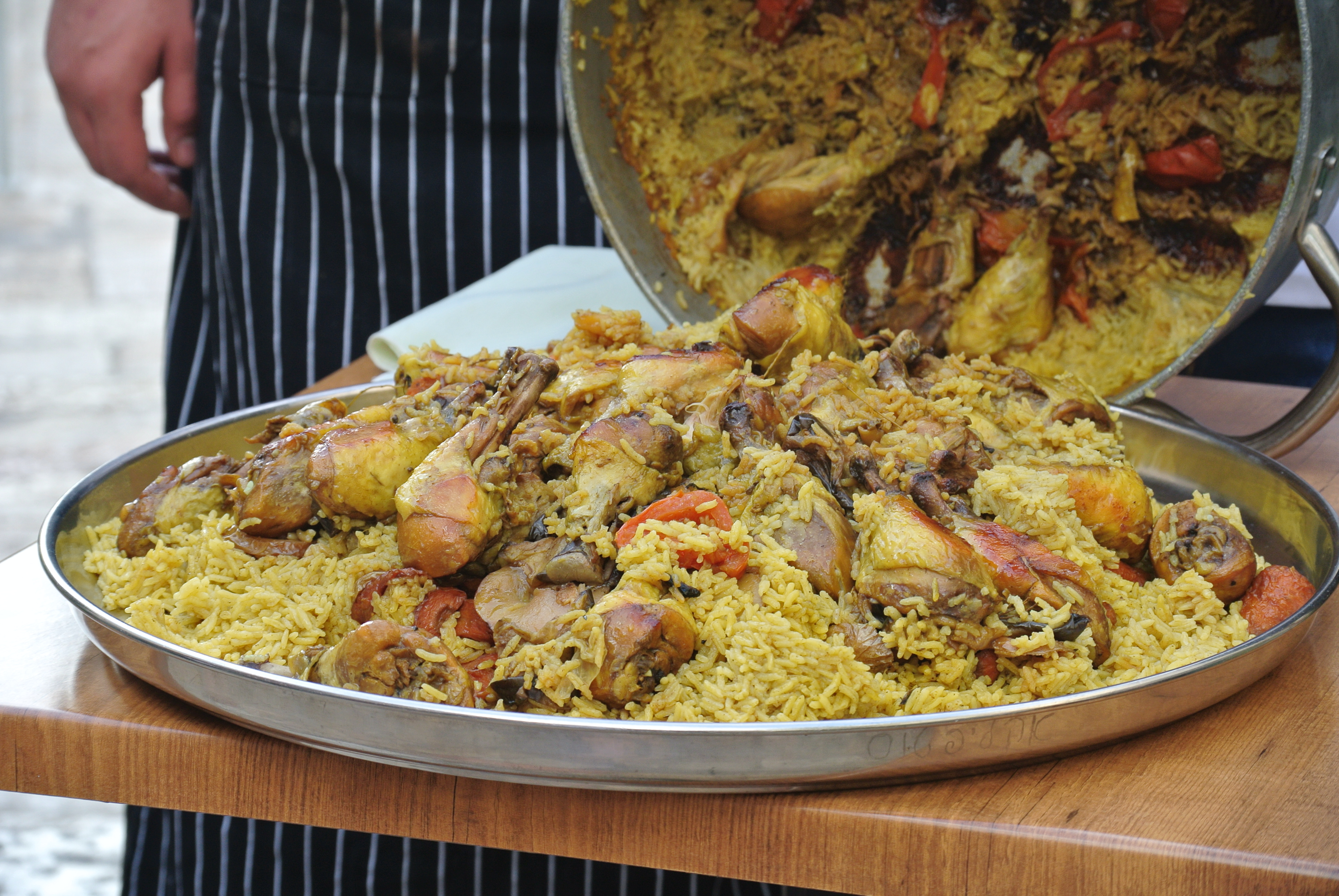
Basson serves maqluba

The menu is primarily meat-based, although some vegetarian and vegan dishes are available. Tasting menus are available for different courses, such as a soup course of Jerusalem artichoke, lentil, and tomato and mint soups and a meze course of pickled green almonds, marinated black olives, and hummus and eggplant salad. Basson makes a ceremony with diner participation out of his signature dish, maqluba, a regional dish prepared by browning chicken in the bottom of a heavy pot, layering browned vegetables and rice into the pot, slow-cooking the dish without stirring it, and finally flipping it out upside down to produce a cake-shaped mound with layers of rice and vegetables topped by the chicken. Other house specialties are figs stuffed with chicken and served in a sweet and sour tamarind sauce, and neck of lamb baked overnight in a clay pot covered with pita bread.

The restaurant has hosted several multi-course dinners featuring animals and birds whose kashrut status is not widely known. These include an 18-course meal in 2010 that featured pheasant and guineafowl pastries, water buffalo, swordfish, deer, and fried locust, and a 16-course "Feast of Exotic Curiosities" sponsored by the Biblical Museum of Natural History, including Asian water buffalo, kingklip fish, and Muscovy duck. When a plague of locusts swarmed into southern Israel in 2013, Basson served the kosher species of locust to customers at private dining events.

== Cafe Esperanza ==
In 2013 Basson opened a 100-seat kosher dairy cafe over the restaurant. Named after Basson's mother and daughter, Cafe Esperanza's menu draws on Italian and Levantine influences. Customers can select their salad ingredients from planters lining the balcony.
