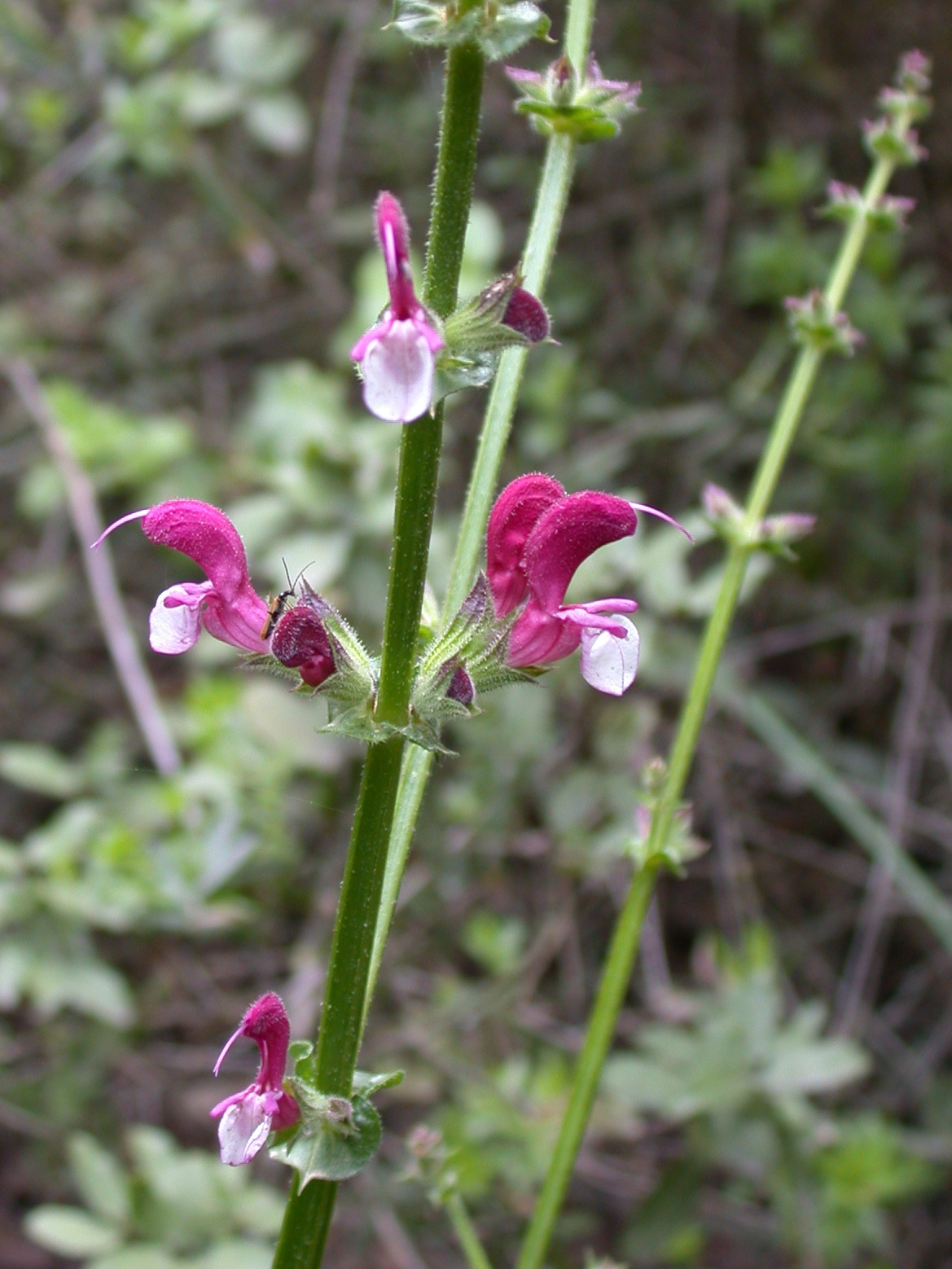

Scientific classification
- Kingdom: Plantae
- Clade: Tracheophytes
- Clade: Angiosperms
- Clade: Eudicots
- Clade: Asterids
- Order: Lamiales
- Family: Lamiaceae
- Genus: Salvia
- Species: S. hierosolymitana

Binomial name
- Salvia hierosolymitana Boiss.

Synonyms
- Salvia hierosolymitana var. chlorocalycina (Bornm.) Feinbrun

= Salvia hierosolymitana =

Species of plant in the mint family

Salvia hierosolymitana is a species of flowering plant in the family Lamiaceae. It is a herbaceous perennial commonly called Jerusalem salvia or Jerusalem sage that is native to the eastern Mediterranean, with populations in Cyprus, Israel, Jordan, Lebanon, Syria, and the West Bank. It typically grows in open fields, rocky soils, and among low-growing native shrubs. It was first described in 1853 by botanist Pierre Edmond Boissier, with the epithet "hierosolymitana" referring to "royal, sacred Jerusalem".

It forms a mound of basal leaves that spreads to 2 ft (0.6 m), and slightly less in height. The ovate mid-green leaves are evergreen, lightly covered with hairs, and with a scalloped margin, growing 8–10 in (20–25 cm) long with prominent veining underneath. The 1 in or smaller flowers are a wine-red color, growing in widely spaced whorls, with 2–6 flowers per whorl. The lower lip is white, with wine-red spotting. The calyces are pea-green with red veins and bracts edged in red. The square stem of the 1 ft long inflorescences are also edged in red. Unlike many salvias, there is no odor when the leaves are crushed, and there is no known medicinal use of this plant.

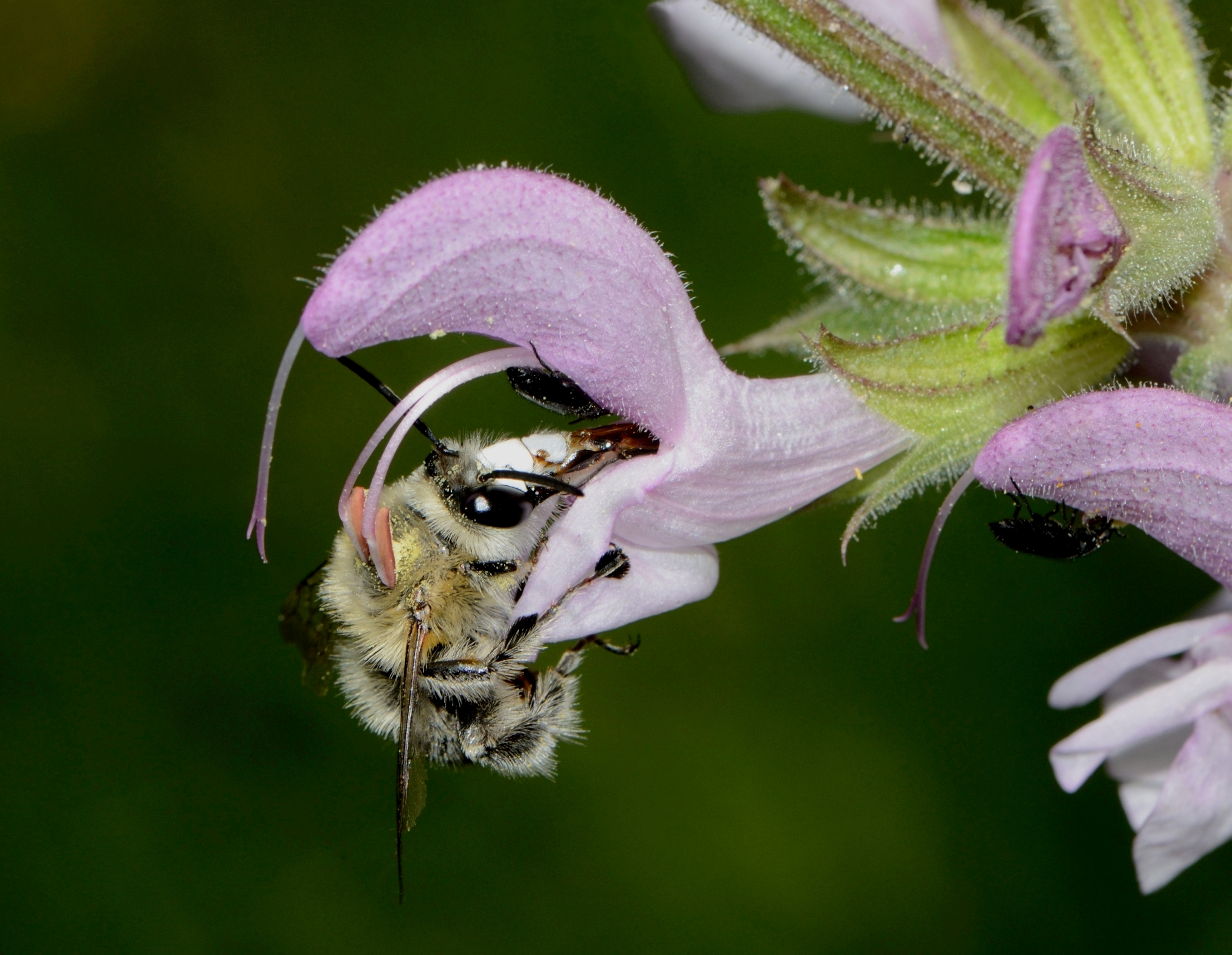
Male digger bee (Anthophora dufourii) pollinating Salvia hierosolymitana, Mount Carmel, Israel

== Uses ==
=== Culinary ===
In Jordanian and Palestinian cuisine, the leaves are stuffed with meat and rice then cooked with lamb riblets.

=== Traditional medicine ===
In Jordan and Palestine, the plant is used for folk herbal medicine for treating various ailments, the seeds are used to prepare a remedy for skin cancer.
