= Dolma =

Stuffed dishes in Middle Eastern cuisine

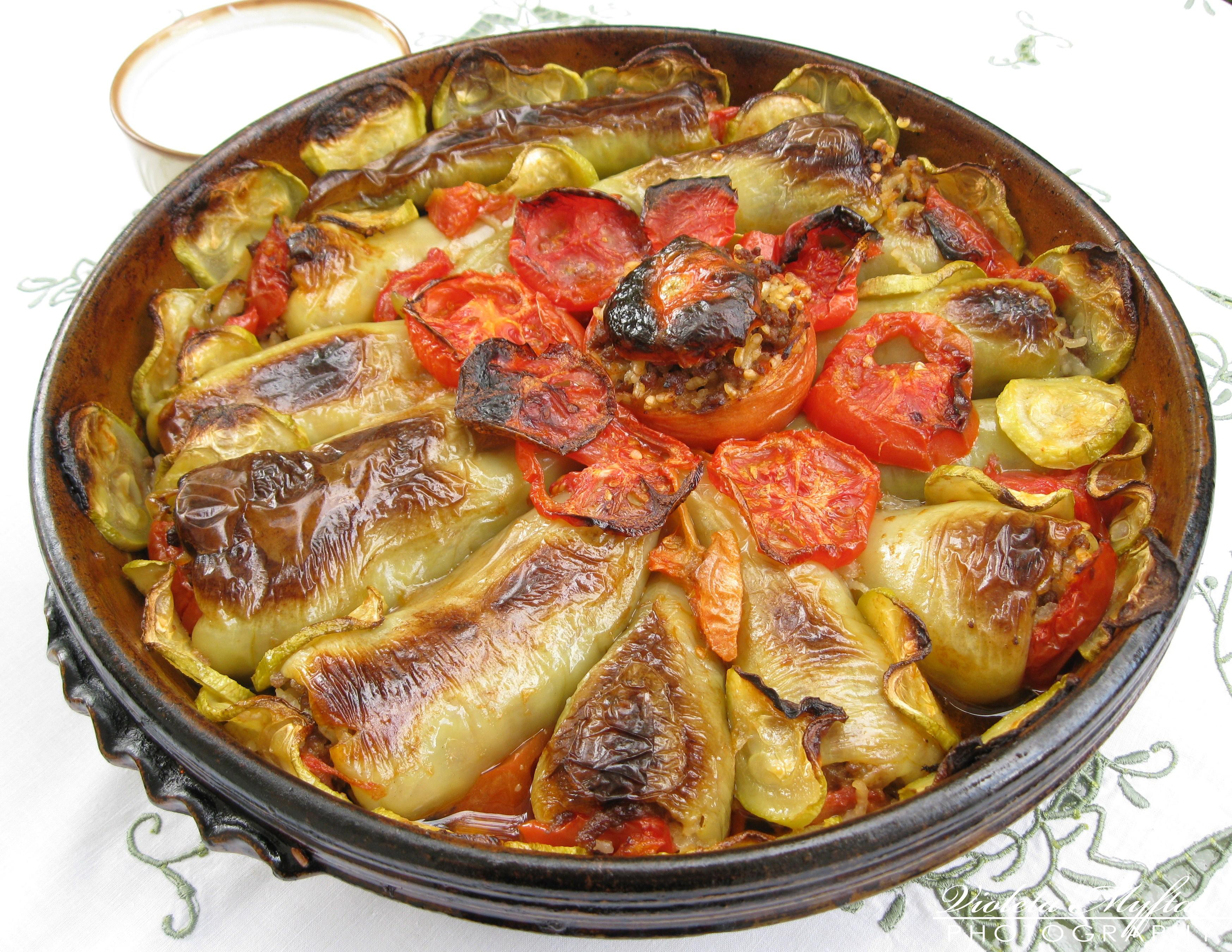
- Whole stuffed pepper and tomato dolma
- Course: Appetizer or main dish
- Region or state: Eastern Mediterranean, Balkans, Anatolia, Levant, Middle East, South Caucasus, North Africa, Central Asia, Europe
- Associated cuisine: Ottoman cuisine
- Serving temperature: Hot, cold, or room temperature
- Main ingredients: Minced meat, rice, herbs, spices
- Variations: Vegetables, leaves, seafood, fruits, meats, offal

Dolma making and sharing tradition, a marker of cultural identity
- UNESCO Intangible Cultural Heritage
- Country: Azerbaijan
- Reference: 01188
- Region: Europe and North America

Inscription history
- Inscription: 2017 (12th session)
- List: Representative

Dolma (US: /ˈdoʊlmə/, Turkish: [doɫˈma]) (literally: "stuffed" in Turkish) is a family of stuffed dishes largely associated with Ottoman cuisine. It mainly includes vegetables and leaves, and occasionally seafood, offal, fruits, and meats, that are hollowed out or wrapped, then filled with a mixture of rice, minced meat, herbs, and spices. The leaf-wrapped type can be specifically known as sarma, but colloquially dolma is used for both.

Dolma has spread during the Ottoman Empire, becoming a staple food across the modern cuisines of post-Ottoman regions and nations.

In 2017, the dolma-making tradition of Azerbaijan was inscribed on the UNESCO Intangible Cultural Heritage Lists. Armenia officially recognizes the preparation and consumption of tolma on its own intangible cultural heritage list.

== Etymology and terminology ==
The word dolma is of Turkish origin and means "something stuffed" or "filled". It derives from the verb dolmak ("to get filled or stuffed"), which itself ultimately derives from the Old Turkic tolmak. Gerard Clauson identifies the verbal root tol- ("to be filled, or full") as widely attested in early Turkic texts and as surviving across the modern Turkic languages with similar meanings.

One of the earliest attestations of the word dolma appears in Thesaurus Linguarum Orientalium, Turcicæ, Arabicæ, Persicæ (1680) by Franciscus a Mesgnien Meninski, where the Ottoman Turkish word طولمه (dolma) is recorded with the Latin definition ripieno ("stuffed" or "filled"). The earliest written mention of dolma in English dates to the late 19th century, appearing in James William Redhouse’s A Turkish and English Lexicon (1890), which defines it as "an act of filling" and "a dish of meat, fruit, or vegetable, filled with rice, forcemeat, etc."

In addition to modern Turkish, dolma is the standard spelling in Azerbaijani and the romanization of the Western Armenian spelling դոլմա, which in Eastern Armenian is տոլմա (tolma). It is also called derevapatat in Western Armenian, which literally means rolled leaves. Name forms related to dolma in other languages include Greek: ντολμάς (ntolmás), Arabic: ضُلْمَة (ḍulma), Persian dolmeh, Georgian: ტოლმა (ṭolma), Tatar: тулма (tulma), Turkmen dolâma, and Swedish dolme.

In Turkey, a distinction is made between dolma ("stuffed thing"), referring to hollowed vegetables filled with a stuffing, and sarma ("rolled/wrapped thing"), in which the filling is wrapped in edible leaves such as vine or cabbage leaves. In other languages from former Ottoman territories and beyond, these distinctions often overlap, where dolma is used more broadly, including for wrapped leaves that would be classified as sarma in Turkish. In some post-Ottoman countries, dolma is referred to by a native term meaning "stuffed", such as γεμιστά (gemista) in Greek, Arabic: محشي (maḥshī) in Arabic, umpluți in Romanian, töltött in Hungarian, punjena in Serbo-Croatian, mbushur in Albanian, polneti in Macedonian, pulneni in Bulgarian, memulah in Hebrew, and rellenada in Judeo-Spanish. In Arabic-speaking countries, native names are often blended with Turkish terms, such as maḥshī yabraq or maḥshī brag in Syrian and Kuwaiti Arabic, a combination of the Turkish word yaprak ("leaf") and the Arabic maḥshī ("stuffed").

In Armenia, a wild grapevine can be found, called toli in Armenian, the name of which is derived from the Urartian word uduli, meaning "grape" or "vine". Like in the other languages, the etymology of the Armenian dolma or tolma is borrowed from Ottoman Turkish and, according to Armenian scholars, it is additionally influenced by the old root toli.

Meatless varieties of dolma are known in Turkish as yalancı dolma ("fake" or "counterfeit dolma"), typically filled with seasoned rice. The term reflects an older culinary convention when vegetarian dishes were regarded as substitutes rather than "genuine" dishes in medieval Islamic societies, as Islam does not prescribe abstention from meat on any occasion. Arabs referred to such dishes as muzawwaj ("counterfeit"). Related forms of the term are used in several other languages, including Arabic يالانجي (yalanji), Greek ντολμαδάκια γιαλαντζί (ntolmadákia gialantzí), Armenian յալանչի դոլմա (yalanchi tolma), and Georgian იალანჩი ტოლმა (ialanchi tolma).

== History ==
=== Origin ===
Although its exact origin is disputed, dolma is mainly associated with an array of stuffed vegetables that originated in Turkey during the Ottoman Empire. The concept is believed to have been invented in the Ottoman palace kitchens during the 15th century, where Ottoman chefs perfected the stuffing of vegetables. Dolma has changed little since Ottoman times, during which recipes for both meat-and-rice fillings, meatless and olive oil-based varieties first appeared.

According to Gil Marks, many credit the Ottoman Turks for the innovation of the dish, who have developed diverse versions and spread the concept. Marks notes that they may have been inspired by manti, a type of dumpling found in many Central Asian cuisines. The Oxford Companion to Food argues that the distribution and the name of the dish indicates that dolma belongs to the court cuisine of the Ottoman Empire, where stuffed vegetables were first treated as a regular culinary genre in Istanbul. The book points out that the Ottoman origin of the dish is obscured to an extent by the fact that it may be referred to by a native name is some countries.

Claudia Roden has suggested that the dish may have been adopted from the Greeks, though she also observes that "stuffed vegetables were obviously developed as a 'court cuisine', invented and prepared for a rich and powerful leisured class to excite their curiosity and titillate their palates, as well as to satisfy their desire for ostentation."

William Pokhlebkin, a culinary historian specialist, contends that the dish's inception traces back to Armenian culinary heritage. The Oxford Companion to Food also notes that, according to some, dolma may have originated in Armenia from where it later spread to Turkey.

The earliest known reference to dolma as a dish appears in the 16th-century Persian book Mâddet ol-Hayât, which observes that cabbage dolmeh is "commonly prepared in the land of the Rûm (Turkey) but not well known in Iran".

==== Early stuffed dishes ====
According to Charles Perry, it was relatively recently that stuffed vegetables became a characteristic food of the Eastern Mediterranean, when the Ottoman Turks made them a regular culinary category 500 years ago. He observes that medieval Arabic cookbooks contained many recipes for stuffed dishes, but rarely stuffed vegetables. Claudia Roden argues that stuffed vegetables do not appear in the early Arabic and Persian cookbooks, but seem to have been known during the Ottoman Empire, where they were possibly developed in this period. The Oxford Companion to Food also notes that vegetables were stuffed in pre-Ottoman times, but only sporadically.

The earliest recorded use of stuffing as a cooking technique appears in the Roman cookbook Apicius from late antiquity. The recipes involve stuffing a variety of animals, including chickens, pigs, boars, sheep, hares, and dormice, as well as fish, such as calamari, cuttlefish, and sardines, and even pumpkins. The fillings generally consisted of forcemeat. The cookbook also provides the earliest recipe for stuffed vegetables, which involves cucumbers stuffed with forcemeat, then cooked in broth or wine sauce.

The practice of stuffing was also known in Central Asia, where fillings (usually meat) were enclosed in thin dough to form dumplings such as manti. Several kinds of stuffed and wrapped intestine dishes are mentioned in the 11th-century dictionary of Turkic languages Dīwān Lughāt al-Turk, with the fillings containing meat, spices, and sometimes liver. One variety called sogut is stuffed with rice in addition to meat and spices, providing the first written information about stuffed dishes containing rice. An Uyghur imperial doctor named Hu Sihui, who served for the Chinese Emperor during the Yuan dynasty, compiled a recipe for stuffed eggplants called qiézi mántou in his 13th-century cookbook and medical text Yinshan Zhengyao. The dish consisted of eggplants stuffed with minced meats, sheep's fat, onions, and mandarin orange peel, which was then steamed and finished with garlic, cream or yogurt, and ground basil.

In the Middle East, stuffing as a technique existed by the Abbasid period, appearing in Kitab al-Tabikh, a 10th-century compilation of the Baghdad court cuisine by Ibn Sayyar al-Warraq. The stuffed dishes appeared in many forms, precisely sausages, meats, pastries (e.g. sānbusaj), and sweets (e.g. crepes). The fillings were based on meat and herbs, while the stuffed sweets were filled with nuts only. Food historian Clifford Wright argues that the Abbasids possibly learned stuffing from the Persians.

Stuffed vegetables first appeared in the region in the 13th-century Syrian cookbook Kitab al-Wuslah ila l-habib, although limited to eggplant and snake melon. They were filled with meat, and cooked in broth, fat, and aromatics.

In the western Arab world from the same century, namely North Africa and Moorish Spain (Al-Andalus), the cookbook Kitāb al-ṭabīẖ contained 50 recipes on stuffed and wrapped dishes, with eggplant being the primary vegetable used for stuffing. By the 13th century, the eastern and western Arab world had been politically separated for five centuries, and the cuisines evolved in their own directions. The characteristic savory stuffing in the east was usually meat or nuts, while in the west, eggs and cheese were common fillings. Other western Arabic stuffed dishes involved pies, pastries, meats, and fish.

Stuffed vine leaves are not mentioned in medieval cookbooks. According to Andrew Dalby, stuffed vine leaves seem to have been used in wrapped foods during the late Roman and early Byzantine times, considering them to be the predecessors of modern dolmades. Rena Salaman provides an example to this, arguing that the Pontic Greeks had a dish called keftethes during the Byzantine period, which were apparently vine leaves filled with small pieces of meat. In Ancient Greece, thrion was a fig leaf stuffed with sweetened cheese. Eugenia Ricotti argues that rice, a key ingredient in modern stuffed vine leaves, did not exist in Ancient Greece. Margareta Aslan similarly argues that rice was not widely used during the Roman and Byzantine times. Moreover, rice had not been an ingredient among the dolma of the Safavid Dynasty.

=== Ottoman period ===
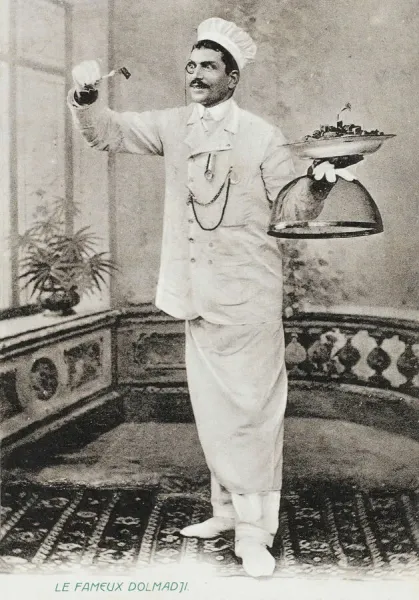
A famous dolma-maker in Istanbul, 1905

During the Ottoman Empire, vegetables became one of the hallmarks of the Ottoman cuisine, especially eggplants. They were so numerous and highly regarded that one observer commented in the 19th century that it was "on the preparation of vegetables that the Turkish cook expends all his art". Most Ottoman families had gardens where they grew their own vegetables and fruits, and in season, market prices were low.

Stuffed vegetables, collectively known as dolma, became one of the most loved and diverse categories of the empire's cuisine. They evolved from just onions and apples in the 15th century to a wide range of vegetables and leaves over the following centuries, with meatless and dairyless varieties becoming mainstream by the late 18th century. By the 17th century, Istanbul had 50 cookshops known as dolmacı that specialized in several stuffed vegetables.

Priscilla Mary Işın argues that the innovation of dolma recipes was driven by the imperial court. The establishment of the Ottoman palace kitchen, known as Matbah-ı Âmire, created a competitive environment where cooks constantly experimented with flavors and techniques to impress the Sultan and his council. The size of the Ottoman Empire further accelerated this creativity, where it connected different geographies and agricultural traditions. Işın points out that "vegetables from across these regions flowed into Istanbul's kitchens, where they were hollowed out, filled, and reimagined".

Several food historians, including Alan Davidson in The Oxford Companion to Food and Claudia Roden, have associated dolma with the Ottoman court cuisine. Precisely, Roden argues that the lengthy, skilled, and delicate preparation of these dishes indicates the presence of numerous specialized cooks in large palace kitchens, while the harmony between vegetables and fillings demonstrates the refined taste and deep culinary knowledge of their masters. She observes that, over time, stuffed vegetables spread to poorer households who simplified the fillings while preserving the time-consuming preparation, as a means of demonstrating their culinary skills and impressing guests.

Dolma also became a marker of status, where rich men and high-ranking state officials began employing specialist dolma cooks. Since stuffed zucchini was the most common variety, foreigners have suggested that the Dolmabahçe Palace got its name because it was built on a "garden where zucchini was grown". Dolma may have spread into the general population through the wealthy Istanbulites, who mimicked the dishes of the Ottoman imperial kitchens by creating their own recipes and elaborating on such dishes.

Religious practices also played a key role in shaping the popularity of dolma. The empire was home to large populations of Christians, who fasted for nearly 180 days a year for Lent and followed dietary rules that prohibited the consumption of animal products. During this period, stuffed leaves and vegetables became increasingly common as cooks found creative ways to make meals without meat, including meatless varieties of dolma.

Ottoman sources record various stuffed dishes between the 15th and 19th century:

- 15th century: onions, apples, tripes, quinces, spleens.
- 16th century: gourds, vine leaves, cabbages, carrots, unripe zucchinis, plum leaves, eggplants, pumpkins, lamb.
- 17th century: fish (mackerels, northern red snappers, bonitos, goatfishes, pacific blue-eyes, common pandoras, cuttlefish), watermelons, luffas, borage leaves.
- 18th century: leeks, spinach, Armenian cucumbers, okras, Jerusalem artichokes.
- 19th century: mussels, melons, ribs, squash, turnips, ducks, bitter tomatoes, red tomatoes, bell peppers, hazelnut leaves, quince leaves, bitter tomato leaves, morello cherry leaves.

=== Historical variations ===
Under centuries of Ottoman rule, dolma spread across territories in the Middle East, the Mediterranean, the Caucasus, and the Balkans, where communities adapted it to local tastes and ingredients, while taking on new names.

Dolma spread as far as Sweden, after the Swedish king Charles XII lost the Battle of Poltava to Russia in 1709, and spent his exiled years in the Ottoman Empire. When he returned to Sweden in 1715 with a taste for stuffed dishes and a retinue of Turkish chefs who created stuffed cabbage rolls, giving birth to the Swedish kåldomar. Swedish chefs developed a sweeter version of dolma, often dressing it with a traditional Swedish syrup called ljus sirap and serving it with lingonberries.

Versions of dolma in Persian cuisine were seen as early as the 17th century, Several dolma recipes were recorded in 19th-century Iran by Naser al-Din Shah Qajar's chef, including stuffed vine leaves, cabbage leaves, cucumbers, eggplants, apples, and quinces, with varied fillings prepared with ground meat, sauteed mint leaves, rice and saffron. Iraqi Jewish families have a version of dolma with sweet and sour flavors that were not found in other versions. Dolma are part of cuisine of the Sephardic Jews as well. Jews in the Ottoman Empire used locally grown grape leaves and adopted the Turkish name of the dish.

Dolma also spread to India. As Armenian merchants settled in Kolkata in the 16th century, they introduced the concept of stuffed vegetables to local kitchens. Bengali cooks invented potoler dolma, where the native gourds potala stuffed with fish, prawns, potatoes, poppy seed paste, raisins, and cottage cheese, cooking it in a fragrant curry.

During winter months cabbage was a staple food for peasants in Persia and the Ottoman Empire, and it spread to the Balkans as well. Jews in Eastern Europe prepared variations of stuffed cabbage rolls with kosher meat—this dish is called holishkes. As meat was expensive, rice was sometimes mixed in with the meat. Jews in Europe would sometimes substitute barley, bread or kasha (barley porridge) for the rice. There are similar Slavic cabbage rolls: golubtsy in Russian, holubtsi in Ukrainian, gołąbki in Polish.

In the Persian Gulf, basmati rice is preferred, and the flavor of the stuffing may be enhanced using tomatoes, onions and cumin.

== Varieties and preparation ==
There are many varieties of dolma with olive oil and clarified butter. The olive oil based dolmas are usually stuffed with rice and served cold with a garlic-yogurt sauce, but variations with meat based fillings are served warm, often with tahini or avgolemono sauce.

A common filling for any stuffed vegetable is a mixture of minced meat, rice, chopped onion and parsley, as well as chopped tomatoes, seasoned with salt and pepper. Raisins, chopped walnuts, and pine nuts are sometimes added to the mixture.

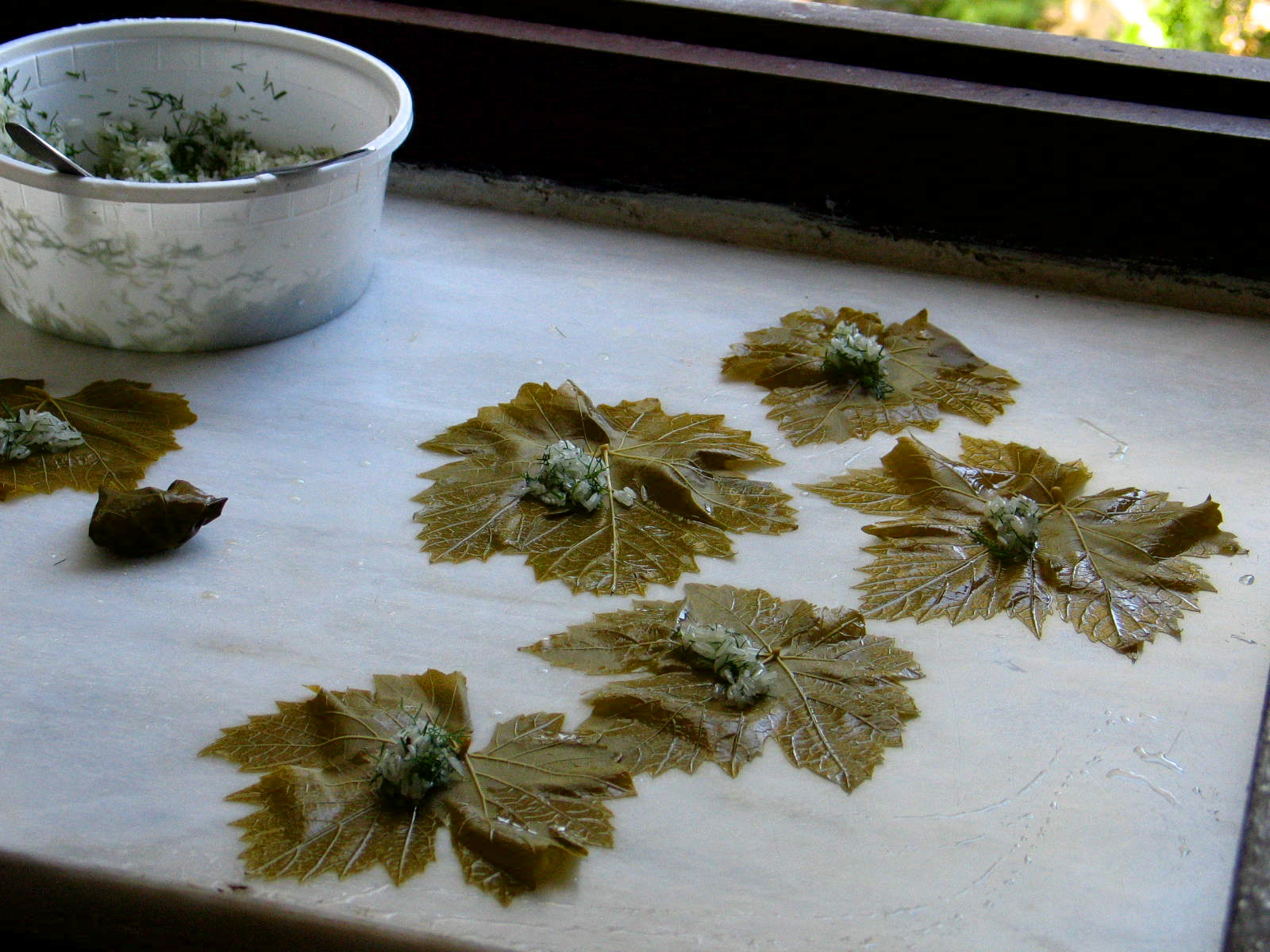
Stuffed vine leaves being prepared

=== Stuffed vine leaves ===
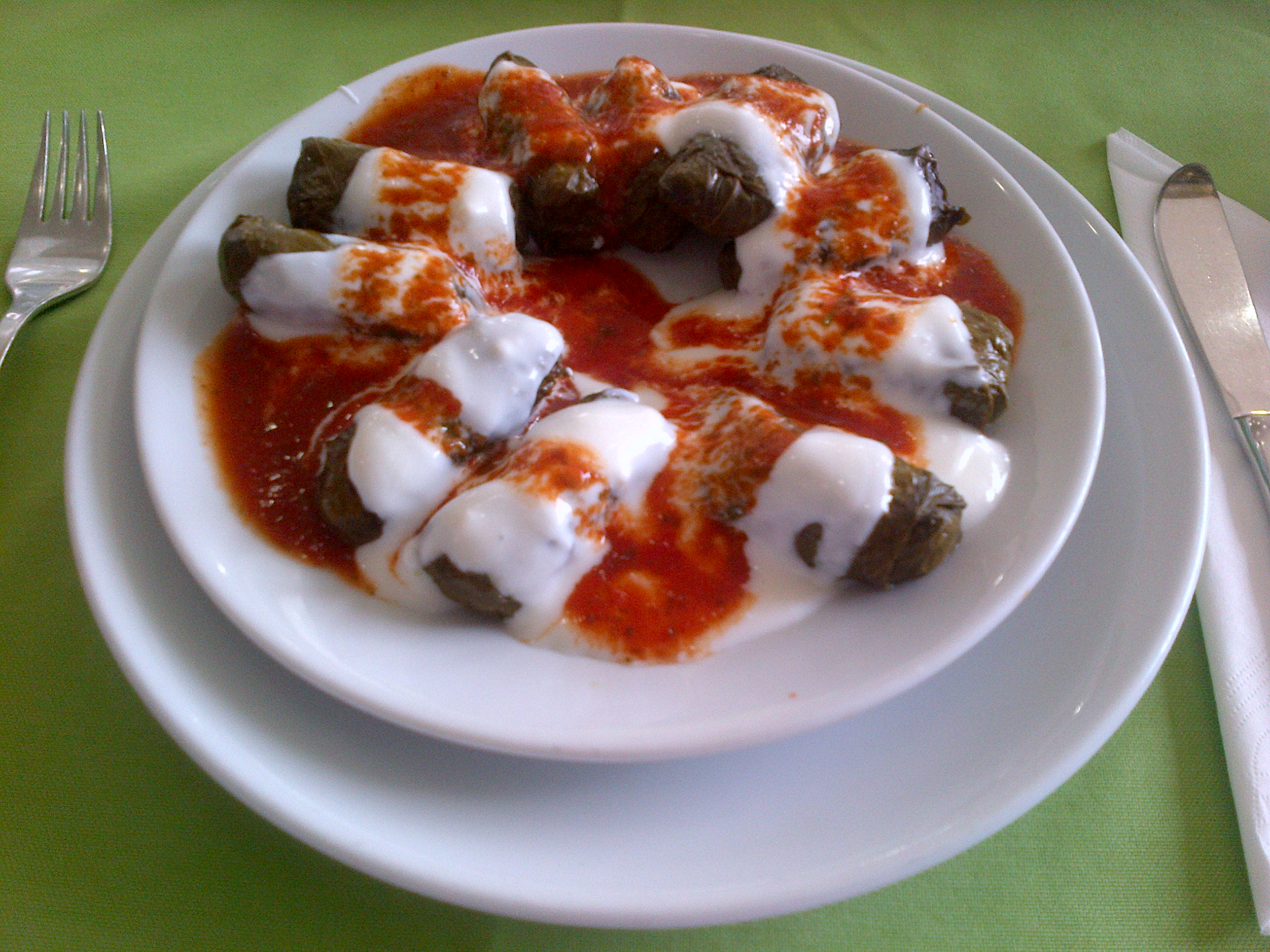
Stuffed vine leaves served with yogurt

The origins of stuffed vine leaves, or sarma, are unknown. They can be made with meat or grain fillings, and served with garlic yogurt, tarbiya or sweet and sour sauces made with pomegranate syrup and sour cherries. They are known as dolmeh in Iran, îprax or sarme by Kurds, dolmades in Greece, koupepia in Cyprus, tolma sardu or terevor tolma in Armenia, yarpaq dolması in Azerbaijan, and yebra in Syria. Egyptians call it mahshi waraq enab (محشي ورق عنب), this version of dolma, or mahshi as it is called in Egypt, is typically eaten during the summer. Stuffed vine leaves without any meat, called yalanchi dolma in Turkish and Western Armenian, are served at room temperature.

=== Cabbage rolls ===
In several countries, cabbage rolls are stuffed with beans and tart fruits. It is wrapped with cabbage leaves, and stuffed with red beans, garbanzo beans, lentils, cracked wheat, tomato paste, onion and many spices and flavorings. Cabbage rolls are called Pasuts tolma (պասուց տոլմա) (Lenten dolma) in Armenian where they are of seven different grains – chickpea, bean, lentil, cracked wheat, pea, rice and maize. Armenian cooks sometimes use rose hip syrup to flavor stuffed cabbage rolls. Cabbage rolls are also known as lahana dolmasi in Turkey and kələm dolması in Azerbaijan. During winter in Egypt cabbage is traditionally used to make mahshi; these cabbage rolls are called mahshi kromb (محشي كرمب).

=== Vegetables ===
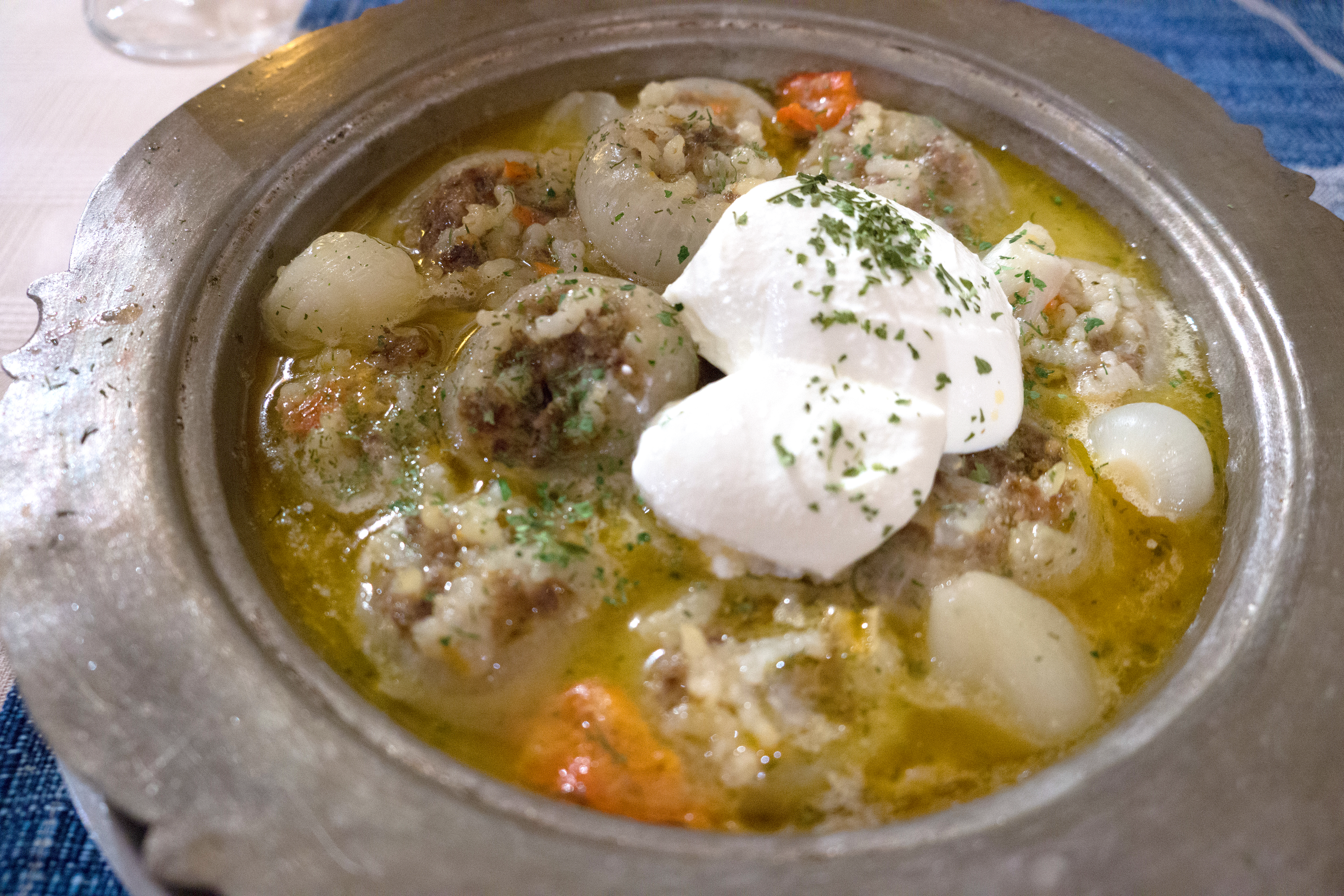
Stuffed onions with yogurt

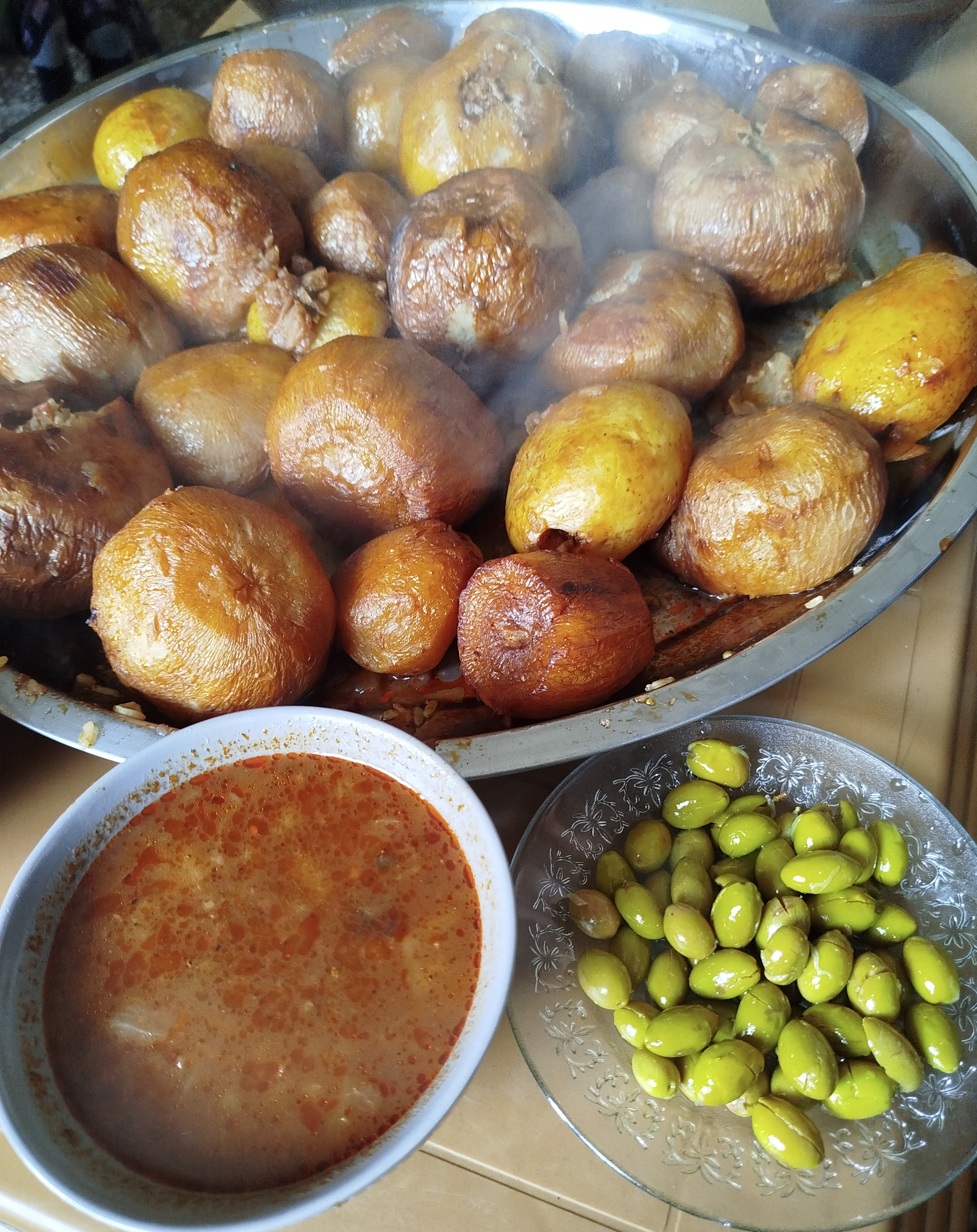
Lift mahshi, stuffed turnip in the Palestinian style

Soğan dolması (soğan means "onion" in Turkish), dolmeyê pivazê in Kurdish), or stuffed onions, its’onats sokh (Armenian: լցոնած սոխ; meaning “stuffed onion”), or stuffed onions, are a traditional dish in Turkey, Armenia and Bosnia. The ingredients include onions, minced beef, rice, oil, tomato purée, paprika, vinegar or sour cream, strained yogurt, black pepper, salt and spices. After the onion's skin is removed, the larger, external, layers (leaves) of onion bulbs are used as containers, so-called "shirts" for the meat stuffing. The remaining part of the onion is also used, mixed with the meat and fried on oil for a couple of minutes, to obtain the base of the stuffing. To extract the separate "shirts", the entire bulbs are cut on the top and then boiled until soft enough to be pried off, layer by layer. In order to prevent a further softening and crumbling, the bulbs should be blanched. The "shirts" are removed from the bulbs by slow and gentle finger pressure. Filled "shirts" are boiled slowly at low heat in broth. The level of liquid should be sufficient to cover the dolmas entirely. Onion dolma are usually served with dense natural yogurt.

Stuffed peppers (Armenian: լցոնած բիբար, Kurdish: dolmeyê îsotan, Greek: γεμιστές πιπεριές, Turkish: biber dolması) are common in many cuisines, while mostly popular in Armenia, Greece and Turkey. Bell peppers are hollowed and filled with rice, herbs, onions, currants and optionally raisins. The Armenian version adds tarragon, mint, walnuts and/or pine nuts to the stuffing. In the cuisine of the Crimean Tatars, dolma refers to peppers stuffed with minced lamb or beef, rice, onion, salt, pepper. Carrots, greens, tomato paste, and spices can be added to the filling. When grape leaves are stuffed with the same filling, however, they are called sarma.

Stuffed turnips are popular in Jordan and the West Bank (notably in Hebron and as-Salt). The turnips are stuffed with spiced rice and minced meat and are lightly fried before being cooked in a tamarind sauce.

Mülebbes dolma is a historic recipe from the Ottoman era. Şalgam dolma are stuffed Russian turnips.

Enginar dolması is stuffed whole artichoke hearts. They may be stuffed with seasoned rice or ground meat cooked in fresh tomato sauce with aleppo pepper. Celery root may be substituted for the artichoke.

Eggplant dolma is a dish popular in a few countries. In Armenia, It is called its’onats smbuk or smbukov dolma (Armenian: լցոնած սմբուկ or սմբուկով դոլմա) and is traditionally made with hollowed eggplant that is filled with rice, meat, herbs (tarragon, mint, parsley, coriander) onions, currants, walnuts or pinenuts and optionally raisins. While another version prepares the filling with onions, garlic, tomatoes, cinnamon, allspice, cumin, turmeric, black pepper, apricots and pomegranade seeds. There also is an Armenian version making this dish using the dried skin and outer layer of an eggplant. In Turkey, this dish is called Halep dolması, named after Aleppo. It is a dish of eggplants stuffed with a meat and rice filling that is flavored with spices and either sour plum flavoring syrup or lemon juice. In the Arab world, this dish is known as makdous (Arabic: المكدوس). It is a dish of oil-cured aubergines. These are miniature, tangy eggplants stuffed with walnuts, red pepper, garlic, olive oil, and salt. Sometimes chilli powder is added.

A regional specialty from Mardin is a mixed dolma platter. The sumac and Urfa pepper seasoned rice filling is first wrapped with onion layers, vine leaves, and cabbage. The remainder of the rice is used to fill eggplant, zucchini, and stuffing peppers. The wrapped onion dolma are added on the bottom of a deep cooking pot and the stuffed vegetables, cabbage rolls, and stuffed vine leaves are layered on top of the onion dolmas. The entire pot of dolmas are cooked in sumac flavored water.

Different forms of stuffed carrots are popular in some cuisines in West Asia, such as Armenian and Palestinian cuisine, usually they stuffed with rice and ground meat, and are cooked in tamarind sauce.

=== Seafood ===
There are also seafood variants of dolma. Stuffed mussels (Armenian: Լցոնած միդիա, or Միդիա տոլմա; Turkish: Midye dolma) may be filled with rice, onion, black pepper, allspice, lemon juice, pine nuts and salt.

The filling for stuffed squid (Note: Greek: Γεμιστό καλαμάρι/Καλαμάρι γεμιστό (yemisto kalamari/kalimari yemisto) Italian: Calamari ripieni Portuguese: Lula recheada Spanish: Calamares rellenos Tunisian: كلامار محشي (kalamar mihshi) Turkish: Kalamar dolması) is made from halloumi cheese, onion, breadcrumbs, garlic and parsley. The whole tentacle is stuffed with the mixture and fried in a butter, olive oil and tomato sauce. For another variation a whole small squid may be stuffed with a bulgur and fresh herb mixture and baked in the oven.

Stuffed mackerel (Turkish: Uskumru dolma, Armenian: լցոնած սկումբրիա), or stuffed trout (Armenian: լցոնած իշխան) are staples of Armenian and Turkish cuisine. While the trout (typically sevan trout) version is more specific to Armenia. The version that was traditionally prepared by Armenian cooks is particularly well-regarded. After the fish is prepared by carefully separating the skin from the meat, the meat is sauteed with onions, currants, dried apricots, almonds, hazelnuts, pine nuts, walnuts, cinnamon, cloves, allspice, ginger, fresh herbs and lemon juice. The entire mixture is stuffed into the whole, intact skin, or grape leaves. The stuffed mackerel is then either baked or preferably grilled long enough to brown the skin.

Stuffed sardines (Greek: σαρδέλες γεμιστές or σαρδέλες παντρεμένες) are often filled with kasseri cheese, tomato, onion, basil and parsley. In Greece and Turkey, stuffed sardines may be served as a mezze platter at traditional eateries called taverna, or meyhane.

=== Offal ===
Dalak dolması is spleen stuffed with rice, meat and herbs. It may be served as a meze, paired with rakı. The dish originates in Armenian cuisine, and is a traditional Armenian Orthodox New Year dish, served with anoushabour and chi kufta. Diyarbekir-style dalak dolması is made with lamb and lamb's tail fat; it was registered as a geographical indication by the Turkish Patent and Trademark Office in October 2021.

Mumbar dolması is intestine stuffed with a moist mixture of ground meat, rice, pepper, cumin and salt. The stuffed intestine is then boiled in water until it is cooked thoroughly, after which it may be sliced and fried in butter before serving.

=== Fruit-based dolmas ===
There are some fruit-based dolmas as well like stuffed quinces (Armenian: լցոնած սերկևիլ, Persian: دلمه به, Turkish: Ayva dolması). There are many variations of this dish. One has a rice and currant filling, flavored with coriander, cinnamon and sugar. Another variation uses meat and bulgur to stuff the quince that is then flavored with grape syrup. Armenian stuffed quinces specifically are made with quince, minced meat or cubed meat, onion, rice, pine nuts or walnuts, raisins, apricots, cinnamon, grape syrup, allspice, cloves, pepper, salt and butter. This type of stuffed quinces is called Etchmiadzin Dolma. Iranian stuffed quinces are made with quince, minced meat or cubed meat, almond, pistachio, barberry, butter, cardamom, coriander, tarragon, plum, onion, saffron, salt, pepper, turmeric and cinnamon. Grape syrup is also an ingredient in the meat-based variants of stuffed apples. and stuffed yellow plums. Persian Jews may serve stuffed quince, called dolma bay, as a Sabbath meal or during Sukkot.

Stuffed apples (Armenian: լցոնած խնձոր, Persian: دلمه سیب, Turkish: Elma dolması) are mostly popular in Armenia, Iran and Turkey. Turkish stuffed apples are made from cubed lamb, ground lamb, rice, black pepper and sumac-flavored grape syrup. Dried apricots and blanched almonds are added to the pot near the end of the cooking process. Armenian stuffed apples are made with apples stuffed with minced meat, parsley, mint, tarragon, black pepper, salt, raisins, apricots, walnuts, allspice, cinnamon, sumac, cumin, sumac-flavored grape syrup, sautéed onions and garlic. This type of stuffed apples is called etchmiadzin dolma as well. Iranian stuffed apples are made with apples that are stuffed with onion, turmeric, cloves, butter, minced meat, rice, cinnamon, pepper, grape syrup, lemon juice, and brown sugar. A meatless variant of the filling for stuffed apples is made from a sauteed mixture of diced apples, diced pears, walnuts, hazelnut, currants, cinnamon, cloves, and star anise. The hollowed out apples are stuffed with the mixture and baked in the oven. This version may be garnished with powdered sugar. This version is most popular in Armenia and Turkey.

Stuffed melons were part of the Ottoman palace cuisine. The recipe survives in modern Turkish, Yemenite, Iranian and Armenian cooking.

=== Other variations ===
Stuffed sorrel (Armenian: ավելուկով տոլմա or սալորի տերևներով դոլմա, Turkish: Labada sarması or Evelik Dolması) is a generic name for meals made of sorrel leaves stuffed with meat (lamb) and rice, or more rarely rice only.

Stuffed mallow (Kurdish: Melûkîyê tije kirî or Dolma ya melûkîyê; Arabic: خبازة محشية; Hebrew: עלי חלמית ממולאים, romanized: Aley Ḥalmith Meemou'laim; Turkish: Ebegümeci sarması) is a generic name for dishes made of mallow leaves, stuffed with meat (lamb) and rice, or, more rarely, rice only. Other names are Mallow Sarma or Mallow Dolma. It is mostly popular in Kurdistan (Kurdish populated regions) Israel, Lebanon, Syria, Turkey, Palestine and the Balkans, where it may be served with yogurt.

== Religious celebrations and customs ==
It is customary for Jewish families to eat holishkes cabbage rolls on Simchat Torah.

Assyrians prepare meatless dolmas for Lent. When traditional ingredients are not available, the Armenian Christian community in West Bengal, India celebrates Christmas with potoler dorma, a local variation from Anglo-Indian cuisine. Stuffed vegetables called gemista or tsounidis are also common in Greek cuisine.

Muslim families often serve dolma as part of the iftar meal during Ramadan and during the Eid al-Fitr celebrations that mark the end of the holy month. Large pots of dolma are prepared during the Nowruz festival.

== Controversy ==
The origin of dolma is a subject of dispute in the region, particularly between Armenians and Azerbaijanis. In Armenia, it is typically rolled into a tube, while in Azerbaijan it is folded into a small parcel. In 2011, the president of Azerbaijan, Ilham Aliyev, stated at the annual conference of the country's Academy of Sciences that "if you ask an Armenian what dolma means in their language, they will not be able to answer. It is a meaningless word for them." In response, Armenia held its own dolma festival, using the term uduli as the festival's name.

The Armenian side notes that the preparation of dolma requires grape leaves, which they consider evidence of early agricultural development; there is also archaeological evidence of viticulture and wine consumption in ancient Armenia. Azerbaijani sources, in turn, point to a Turkic origin for the name of the dish.

== See also ==
- Dolma Festival in Armenia
- List of stuffed dishes
- Sheikh al-mahshi, zucchini stuffed with minced lamb meat and pine nuts in yogurt sauce

== Sources ==
- Alan Davidson, The Oxford Companion to Food. ISBN 0-19-211579-0.
- Gosetti Della Salda, Anna (1967). Le ricette regionali italiane (in Italian). Milano: Solares.
