= Dolma Festival in Armenia =

Annual festival in Armenia

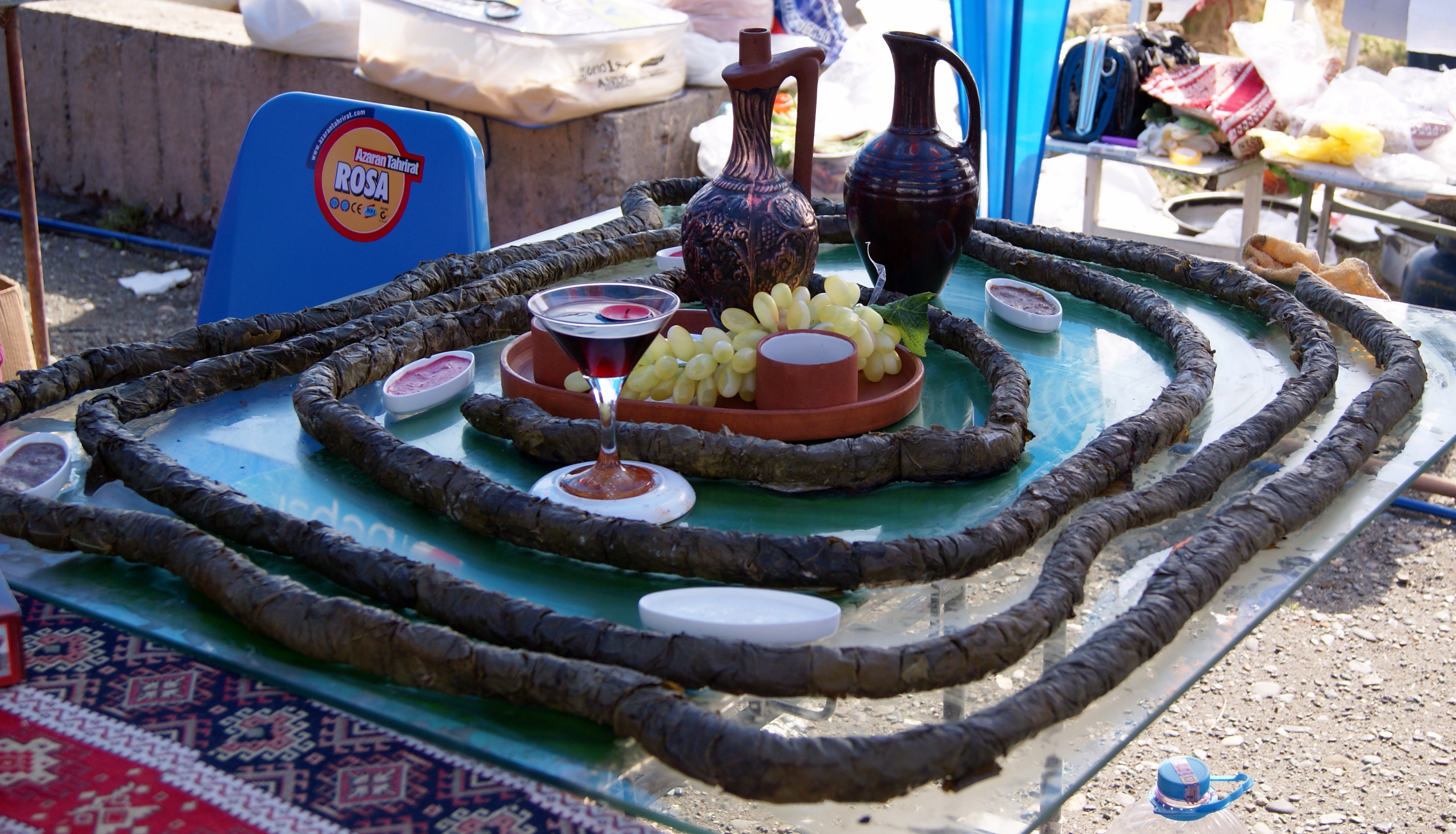
Dolma Festival, Musa Ler

The Dolma Festival in Armenia, also known as Uduli (a term meaning "grape" in Urartian), is an annual festival that is held annually near the city of Armavir, Armenia. It began in 2011 and focuses on appreciation of Armenian cuisine, especially dolma, a traditional Armenian dish made of ground beef, lamb and spices wrapped in grape leaves, cabbage leaves and vegetables.

During the festival, chefs from Armenia and other countries aim to cook different kinds of stuffed vegetable dishes known as dolma. During the competition, festival guests can watch Armenian dances, listen to songs, and taste the dolma. At the end of the festival, a jury chooses the best chef. The winner gets a special prize — a golden statue.

Armenian cuisine uses many spices and herbs, including salt, garlic, red pepper, dried mint (in Western Armenia), cumin, coriander, sumac, cinnamon, cloves and mahleb.

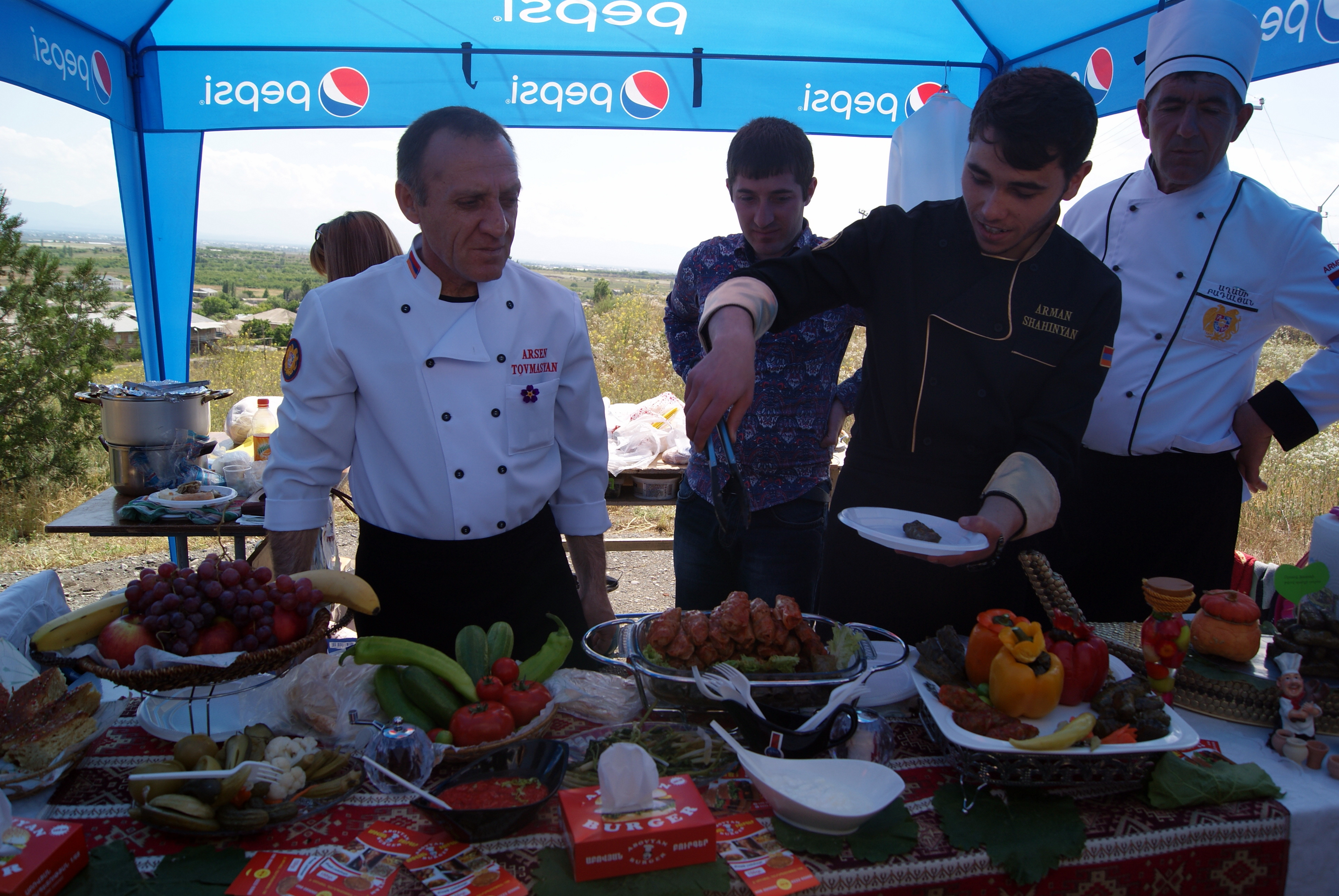

== Dolma ==
Dolma is one of the most popular dishes in Armenian culture. Dolma is prepared from minced lamb or beef mixed with rice, fresh herbs and spices, wrapped in grape or cabbage leaves. Armenians use seasonings such as coriander, dill, mint, pepper and cinnamon. The taste of the dolma varies in each region, including Artamet, Alashkert, and Echmiadzin.

== History ==
The festival was founded in 2011, and from then onward was held in the villages of Musaler and Hnaberd, next to the ruins of the old Armenian capital, Dvin.

== Gallery ==
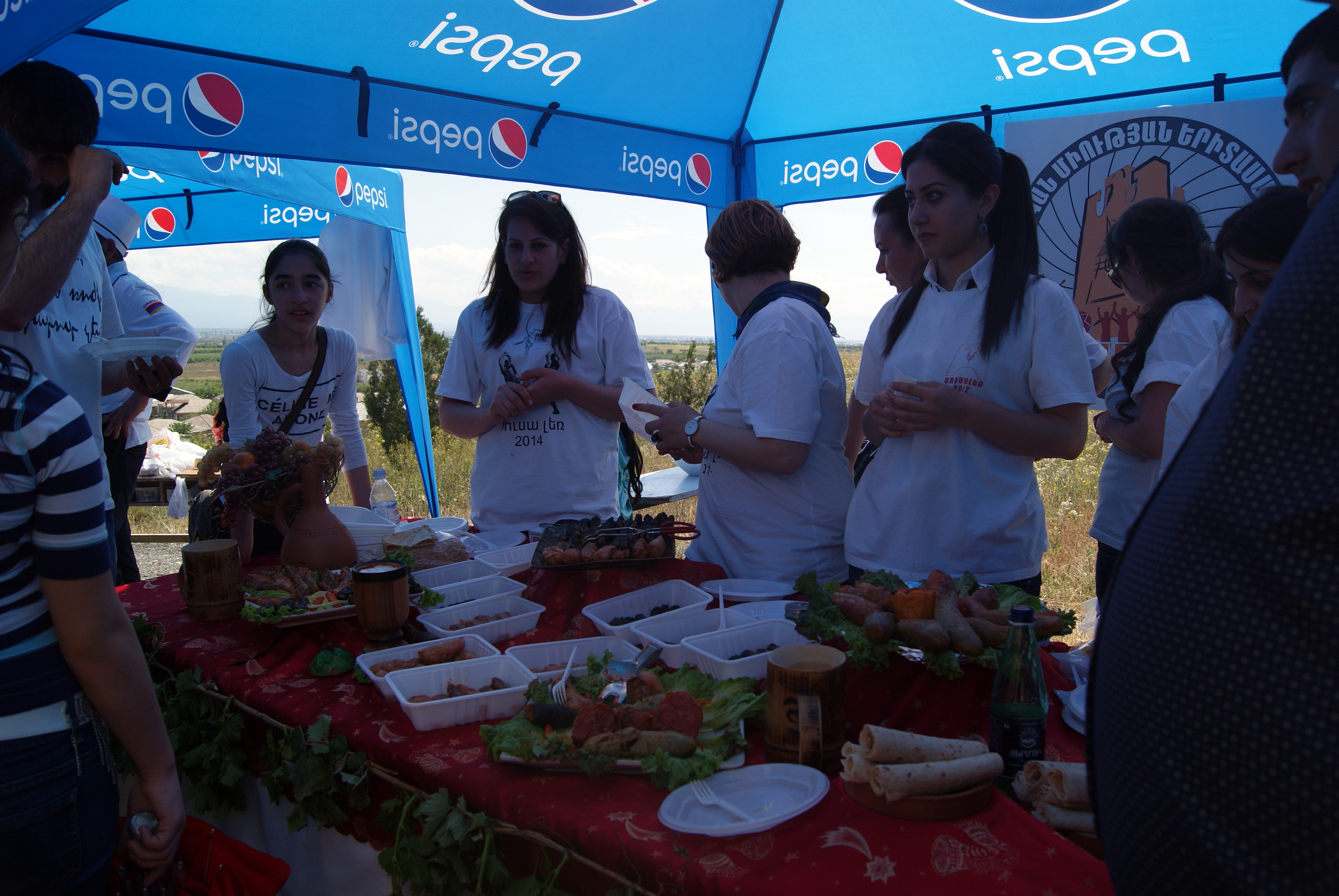
Dolma Festival at Musaler

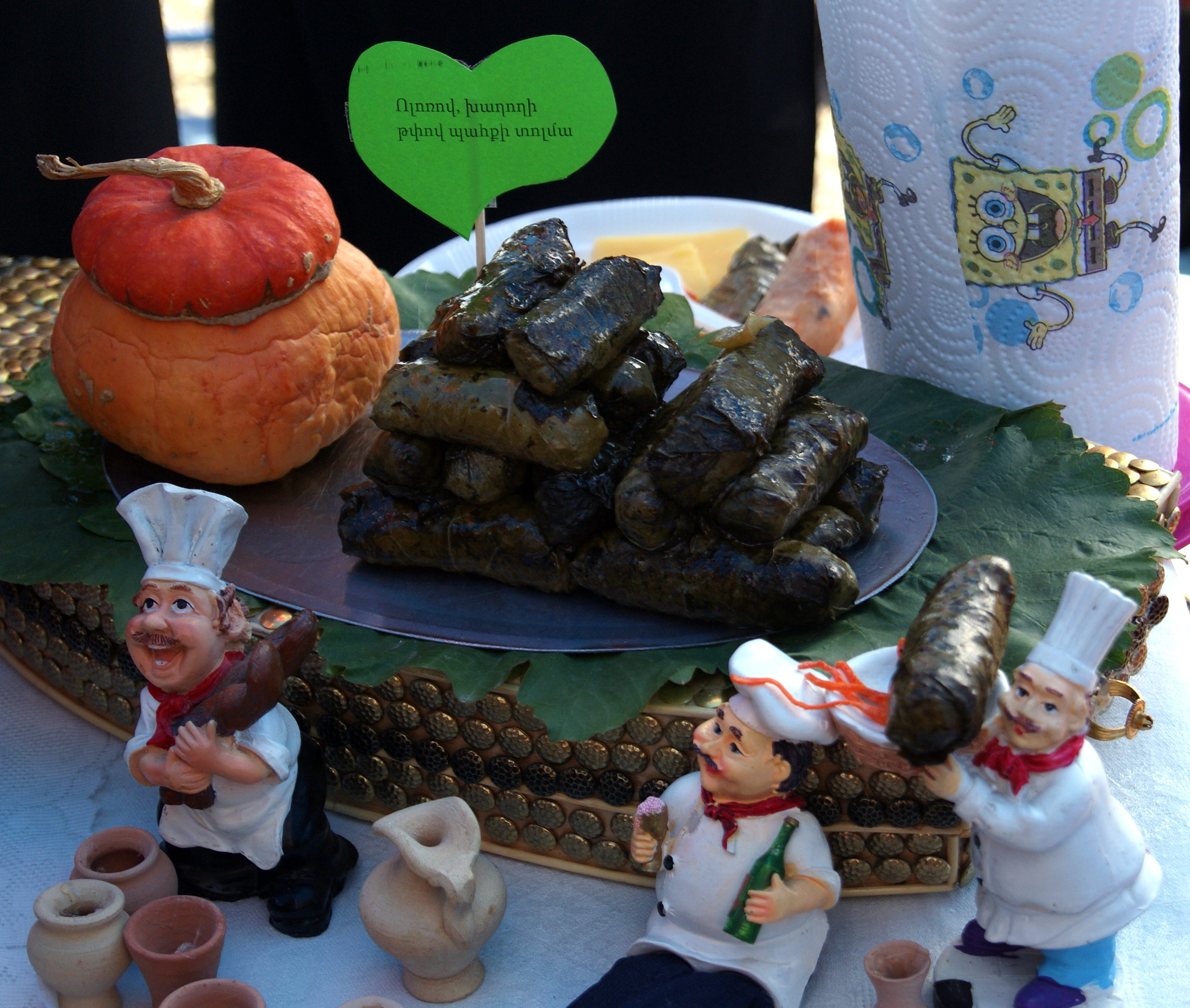
Dolma Festival at Musaler

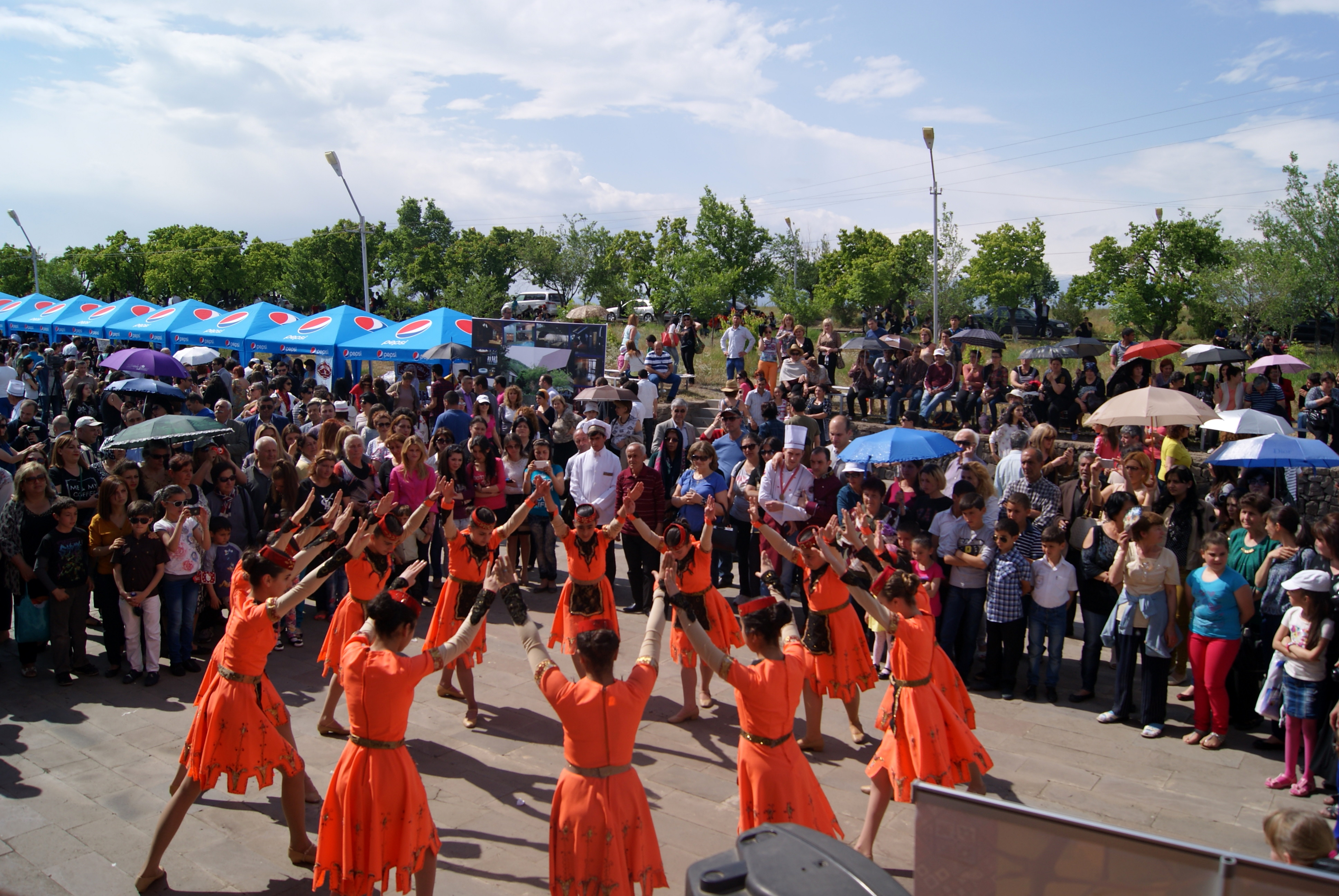
Dolma Festival at Musaler

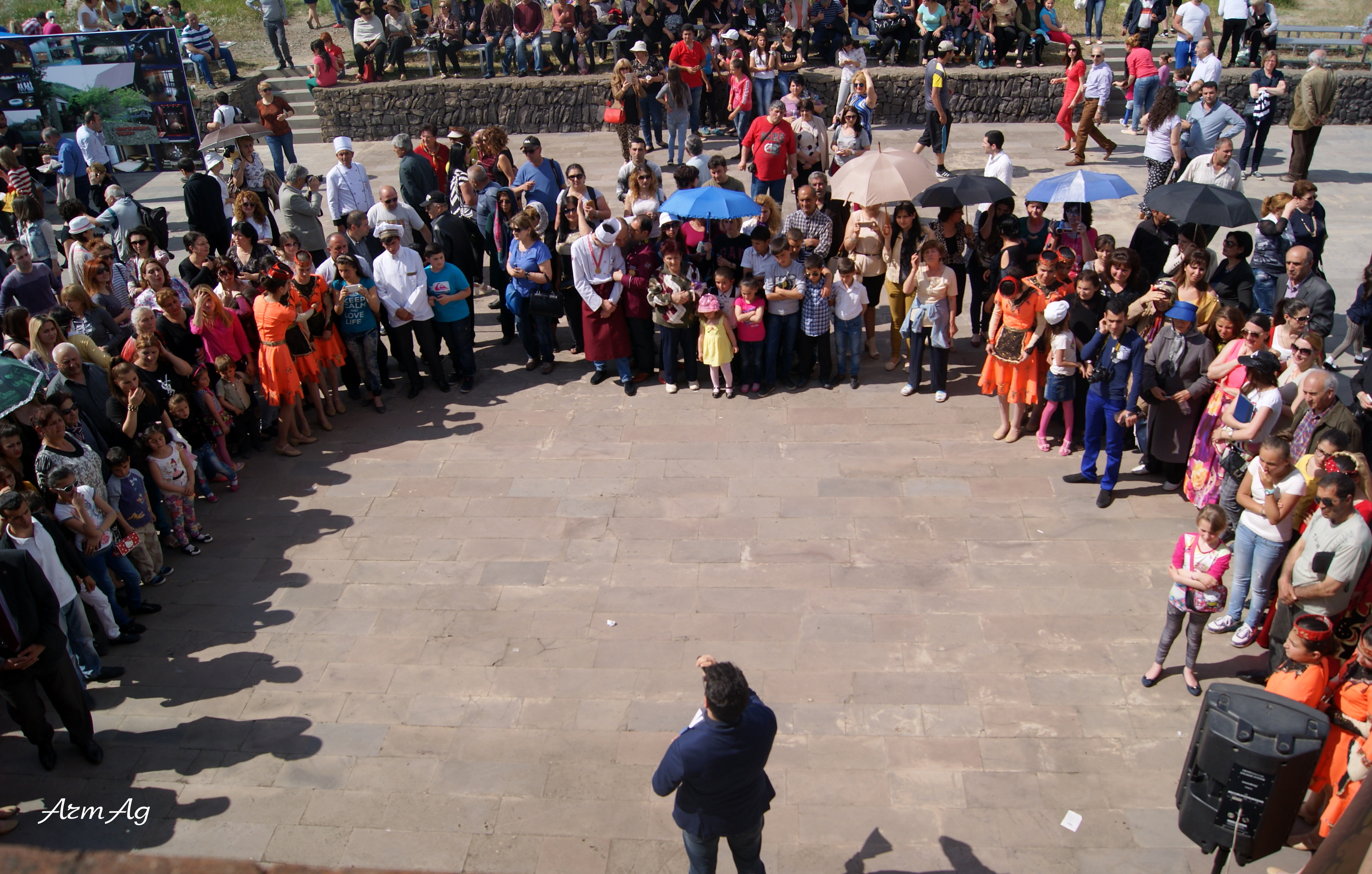
Dolma Festival at Musaler

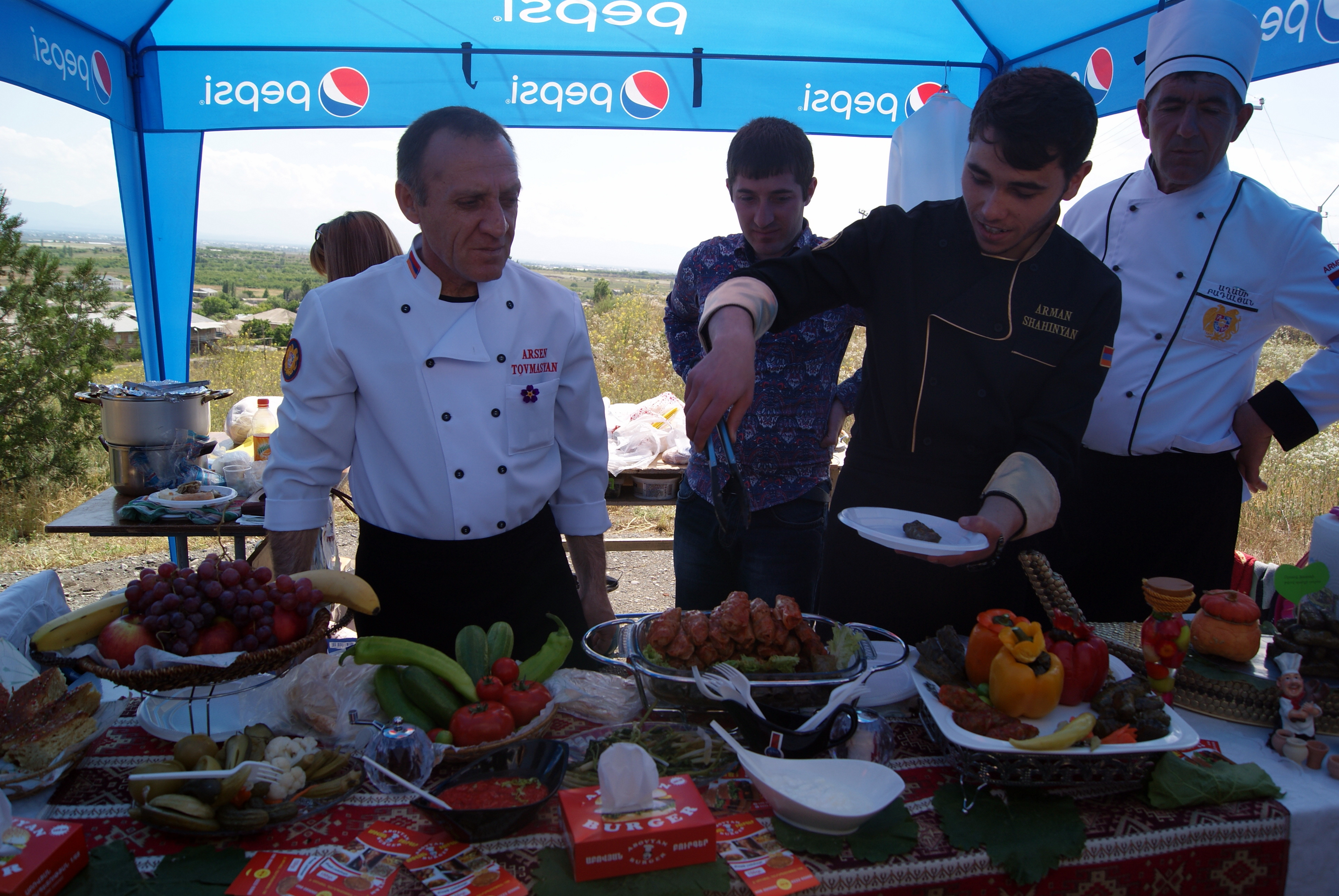
Dolma Festival at Musaler

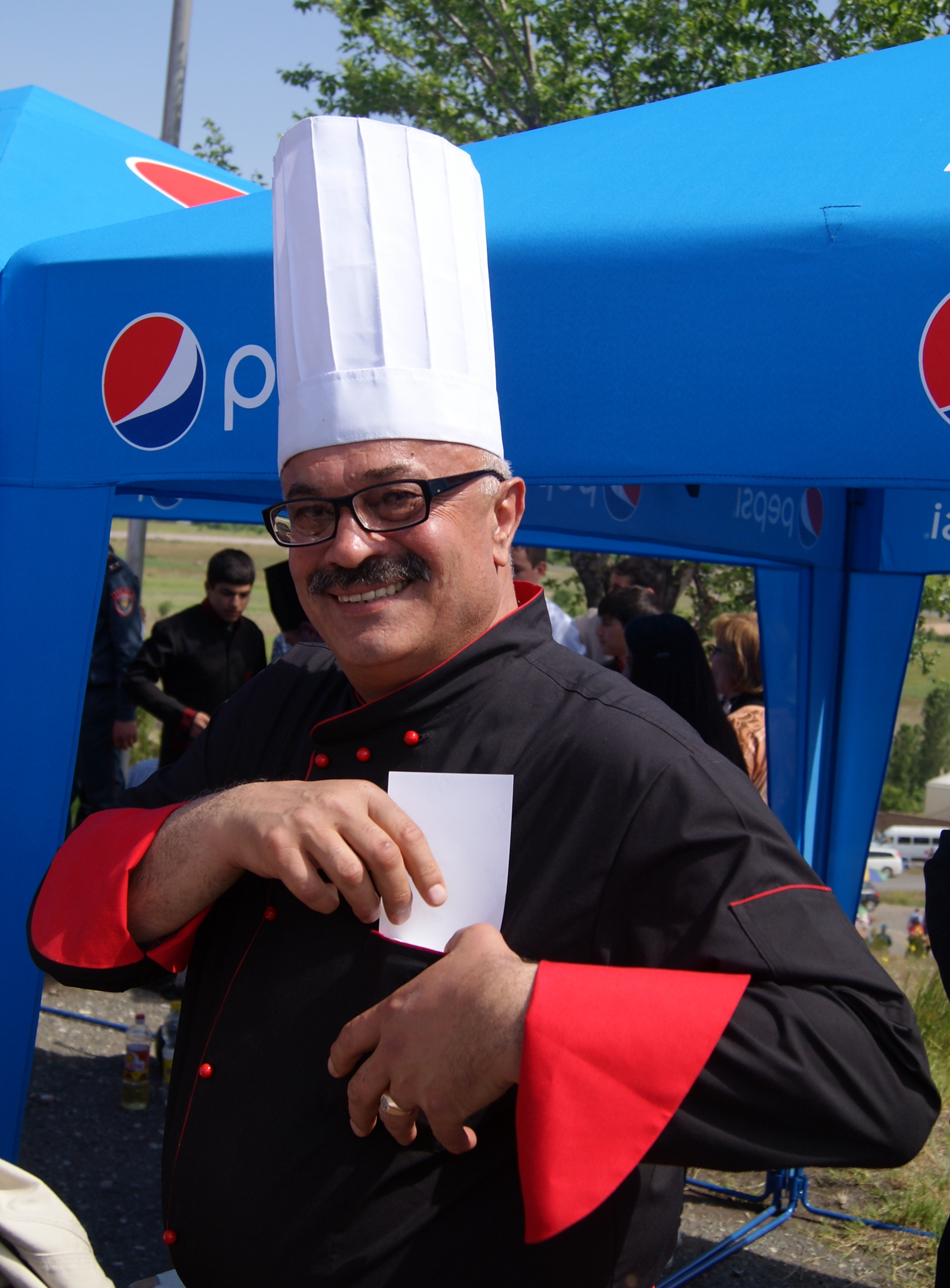
Dolma Festival at Musaler

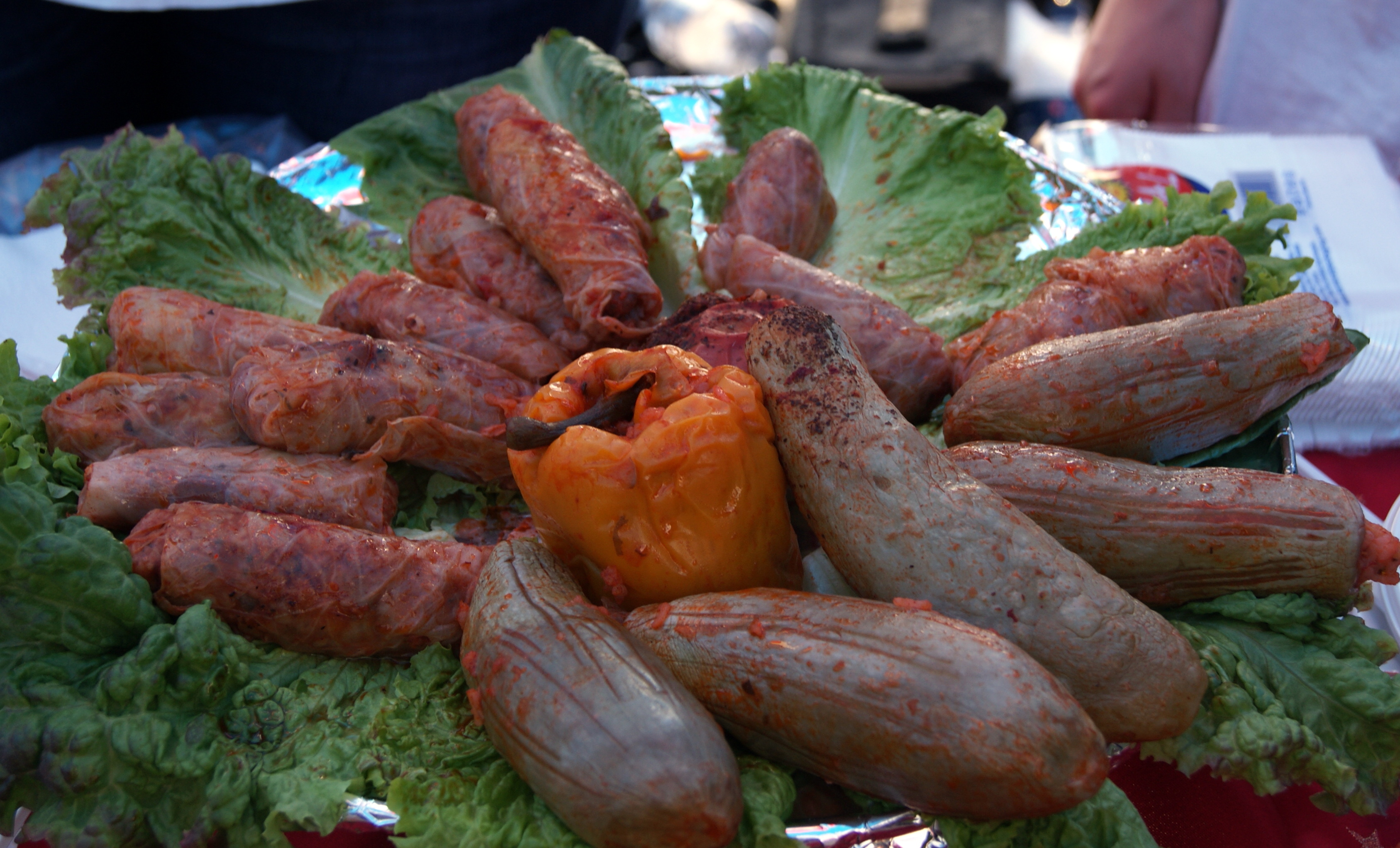
Dolma Festival at Musaler

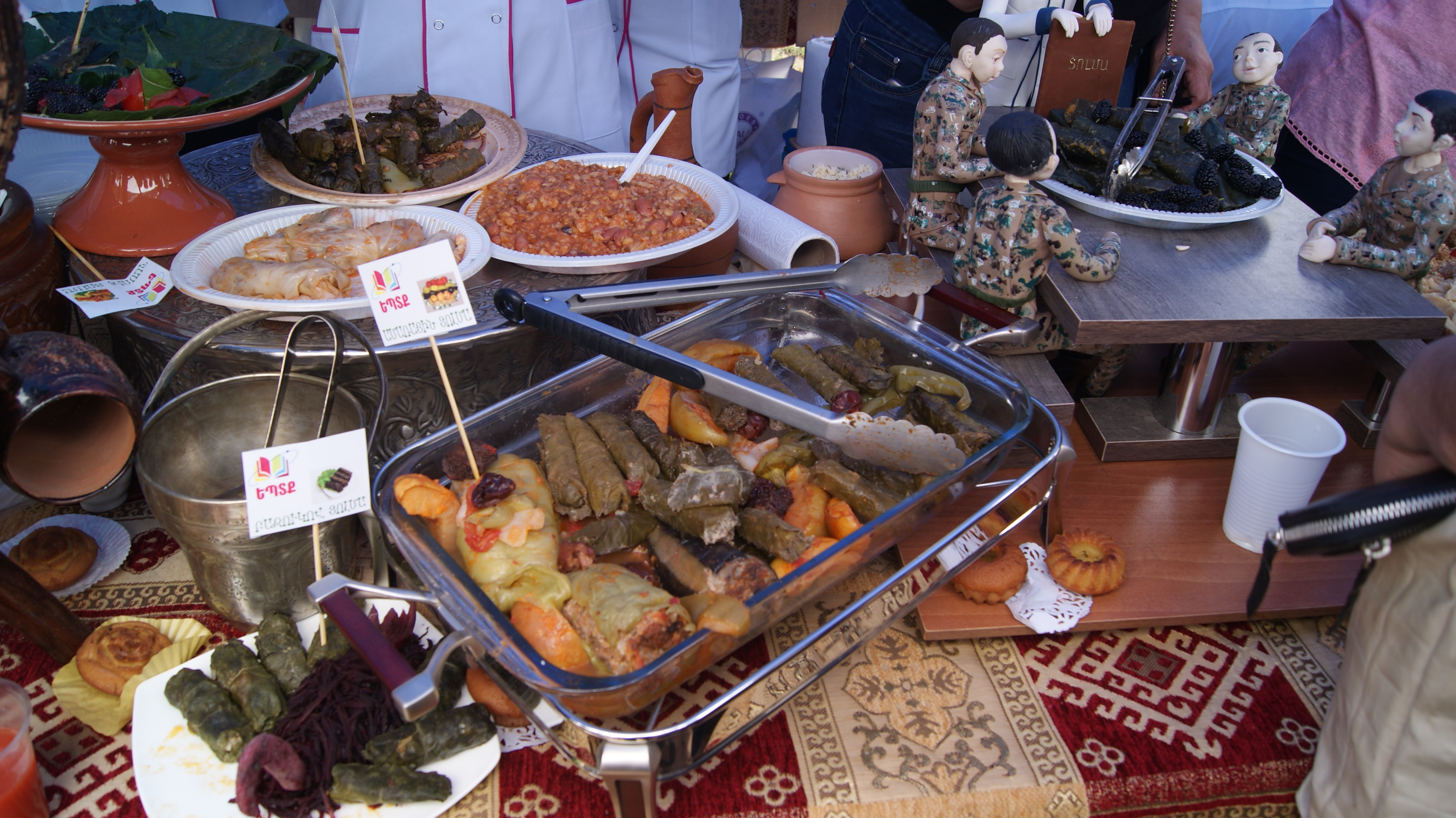
Dolma festival at Hnaberd

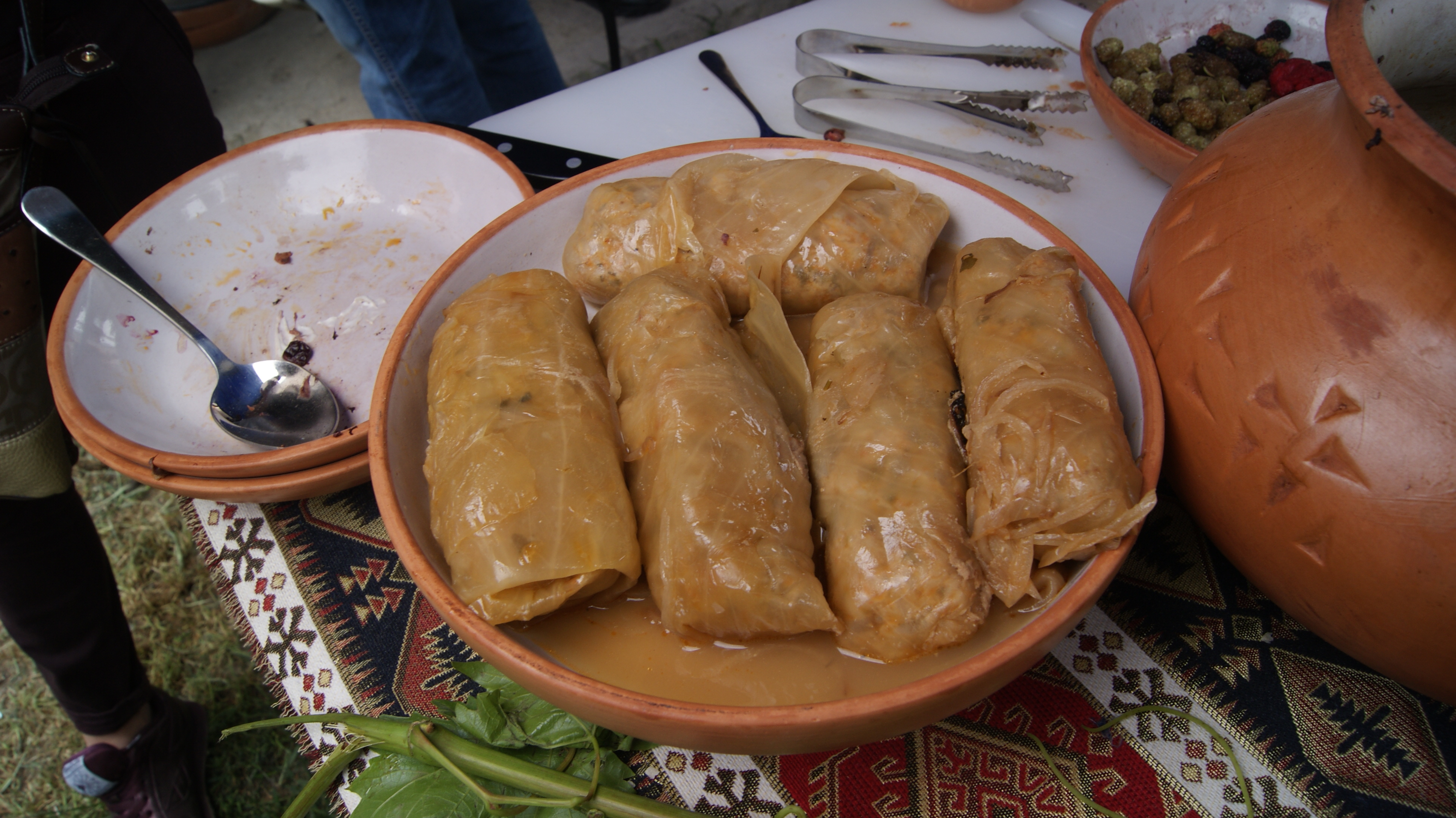
Dolma Festival, Hnaberd

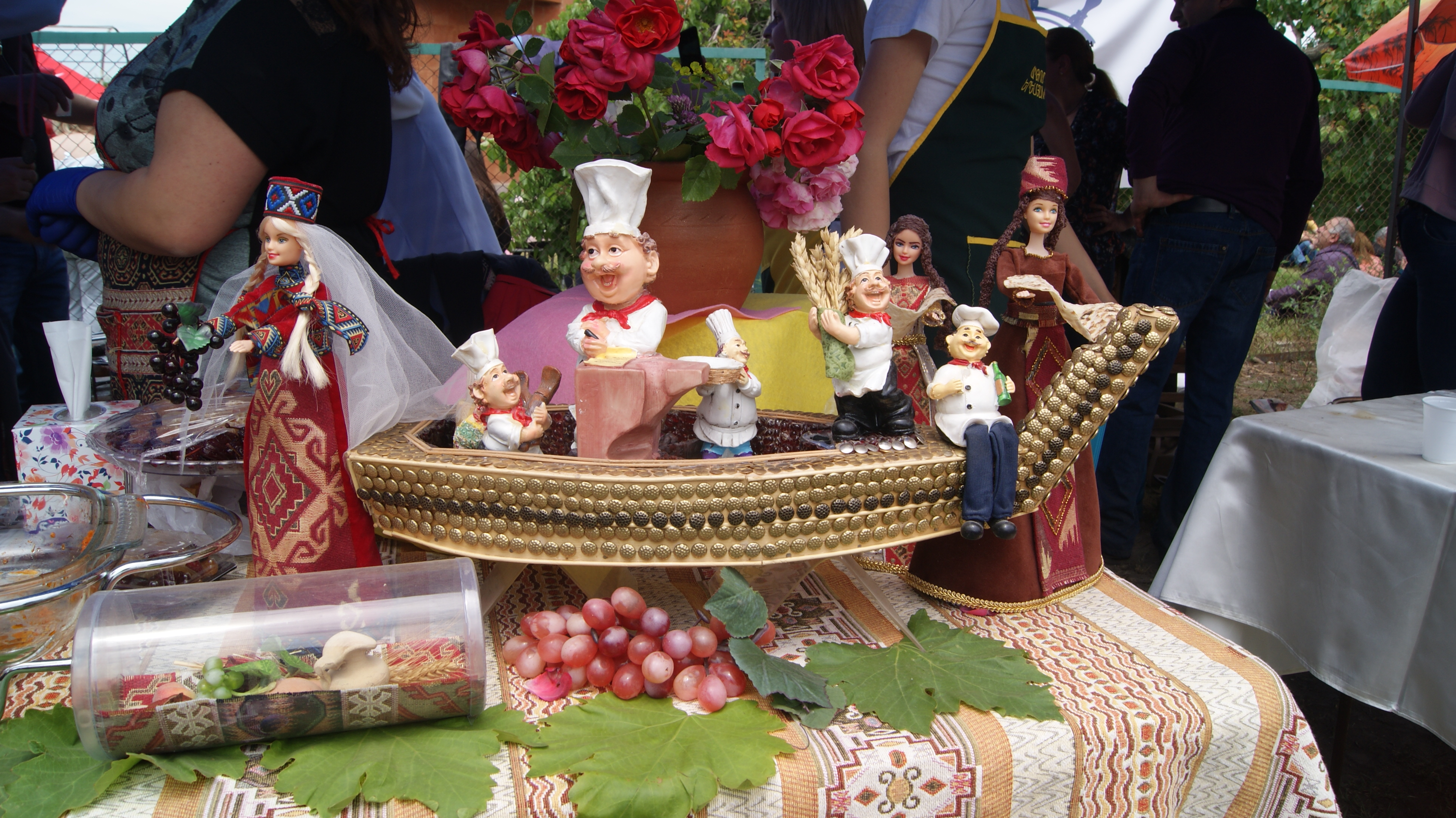
Dolma Festival, Hnaberd

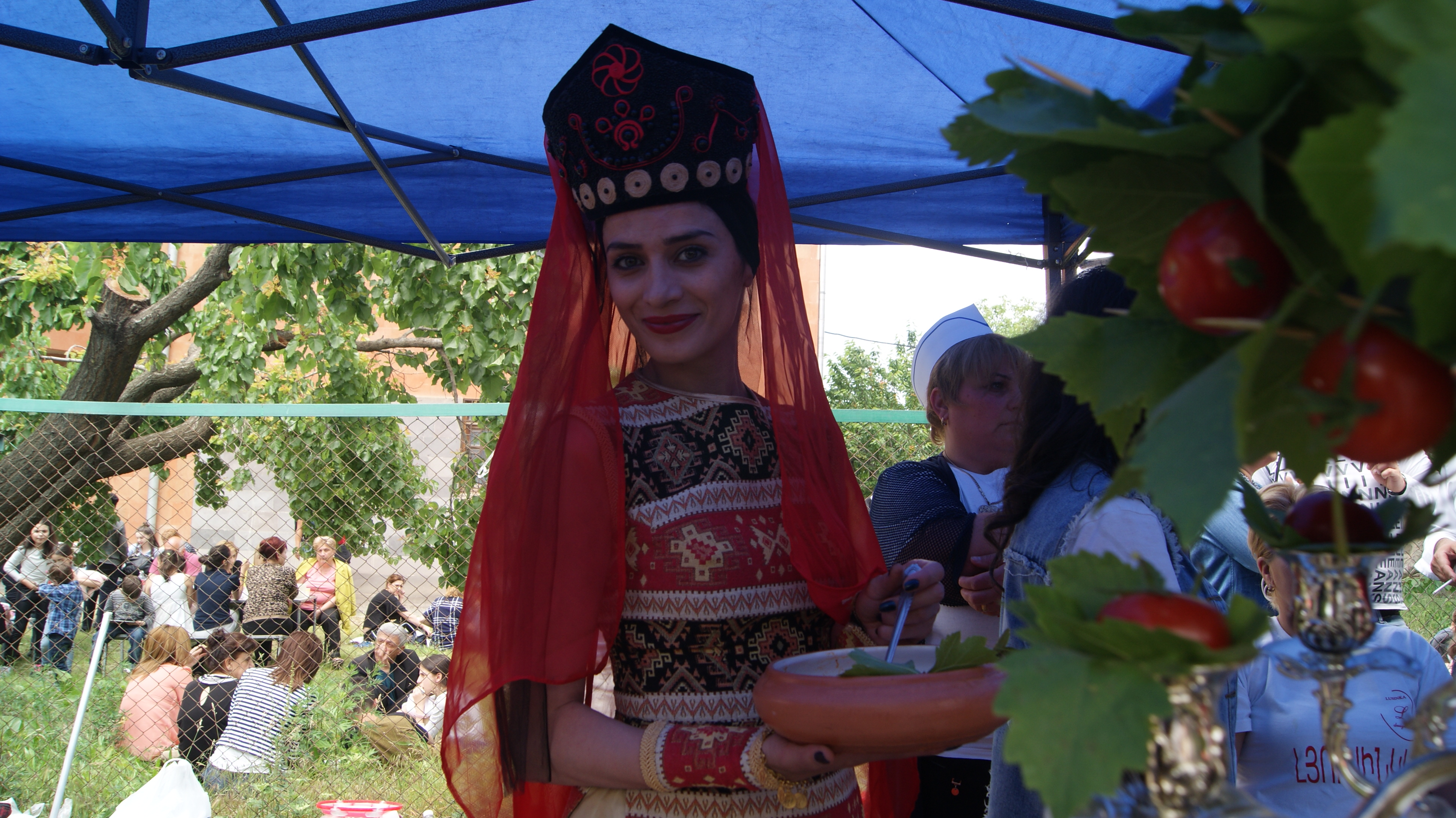
A lady at Dolma Festival, Hnaberd

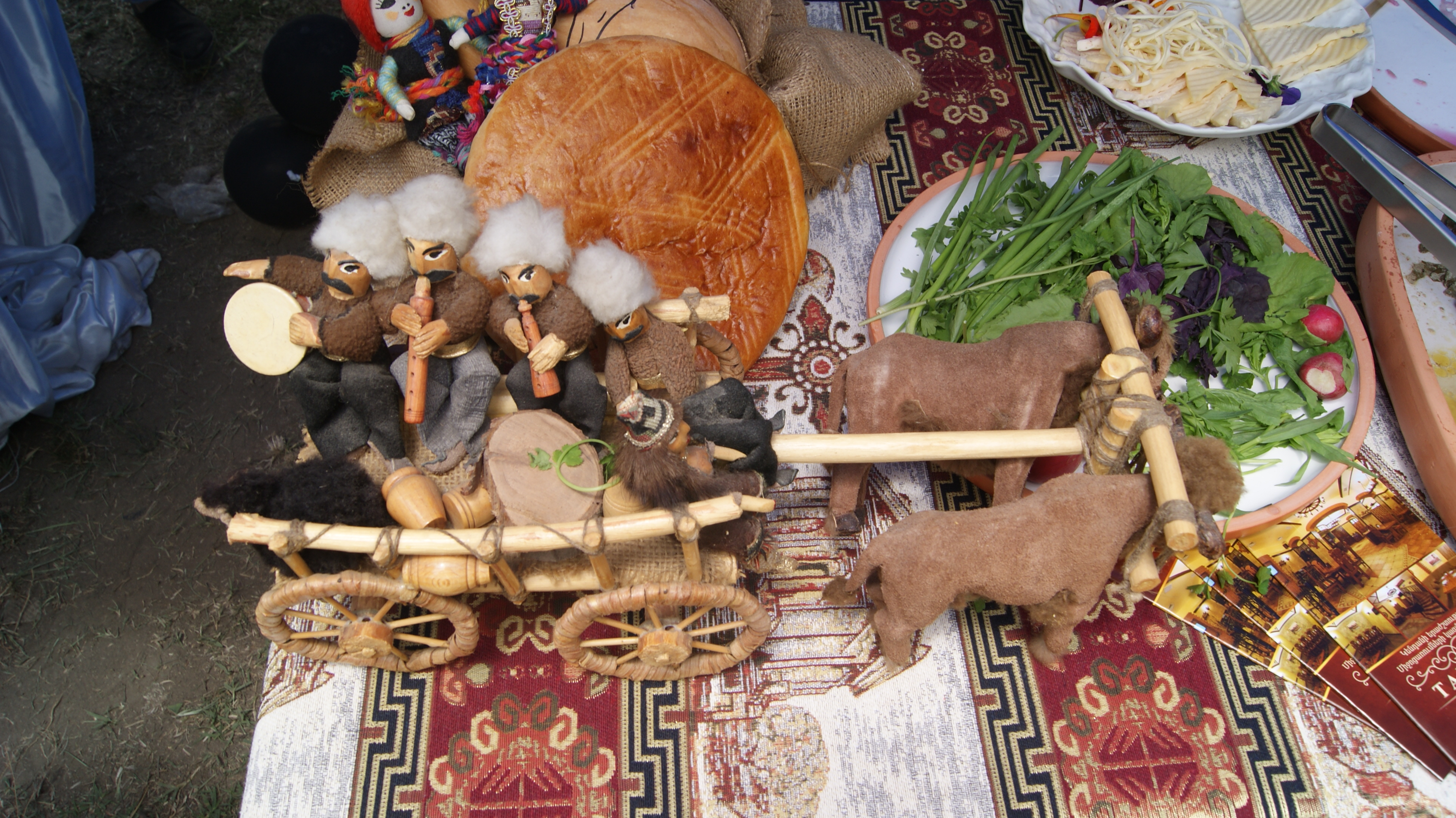
Dolma Festival, Hnaberd

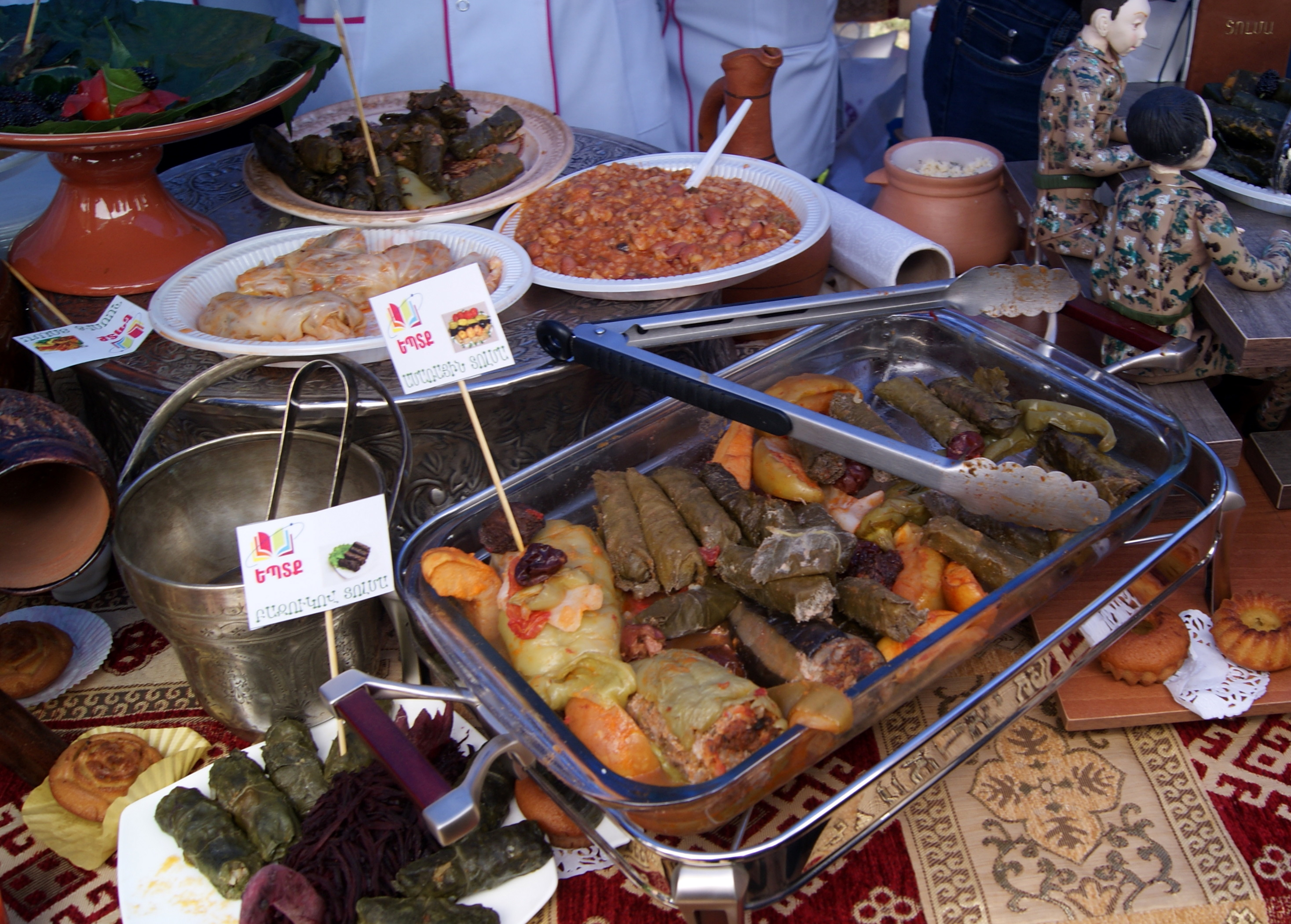
Dolma Festival, Hnaberd

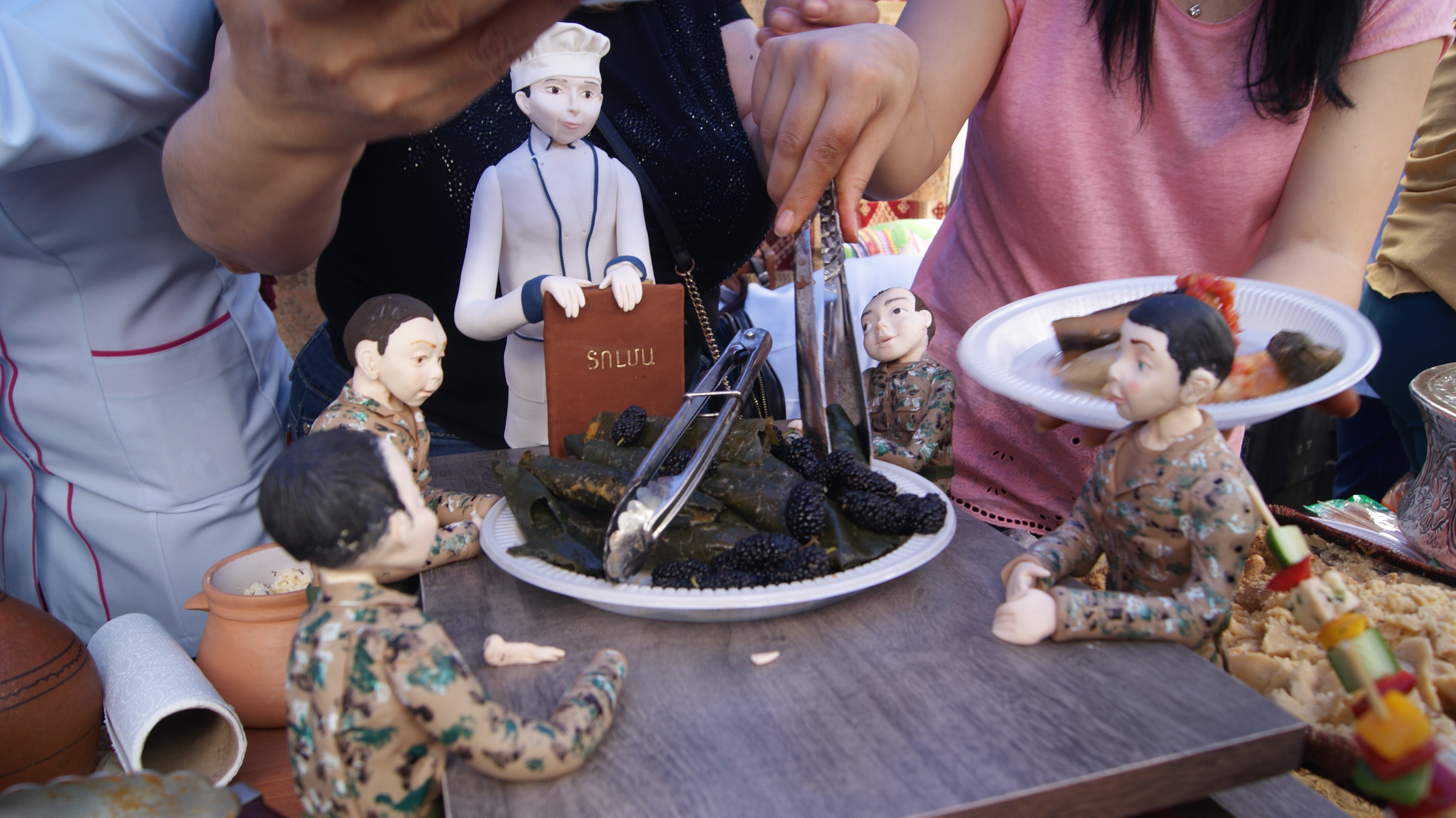
Food at Dolma Festival, Hnaberd

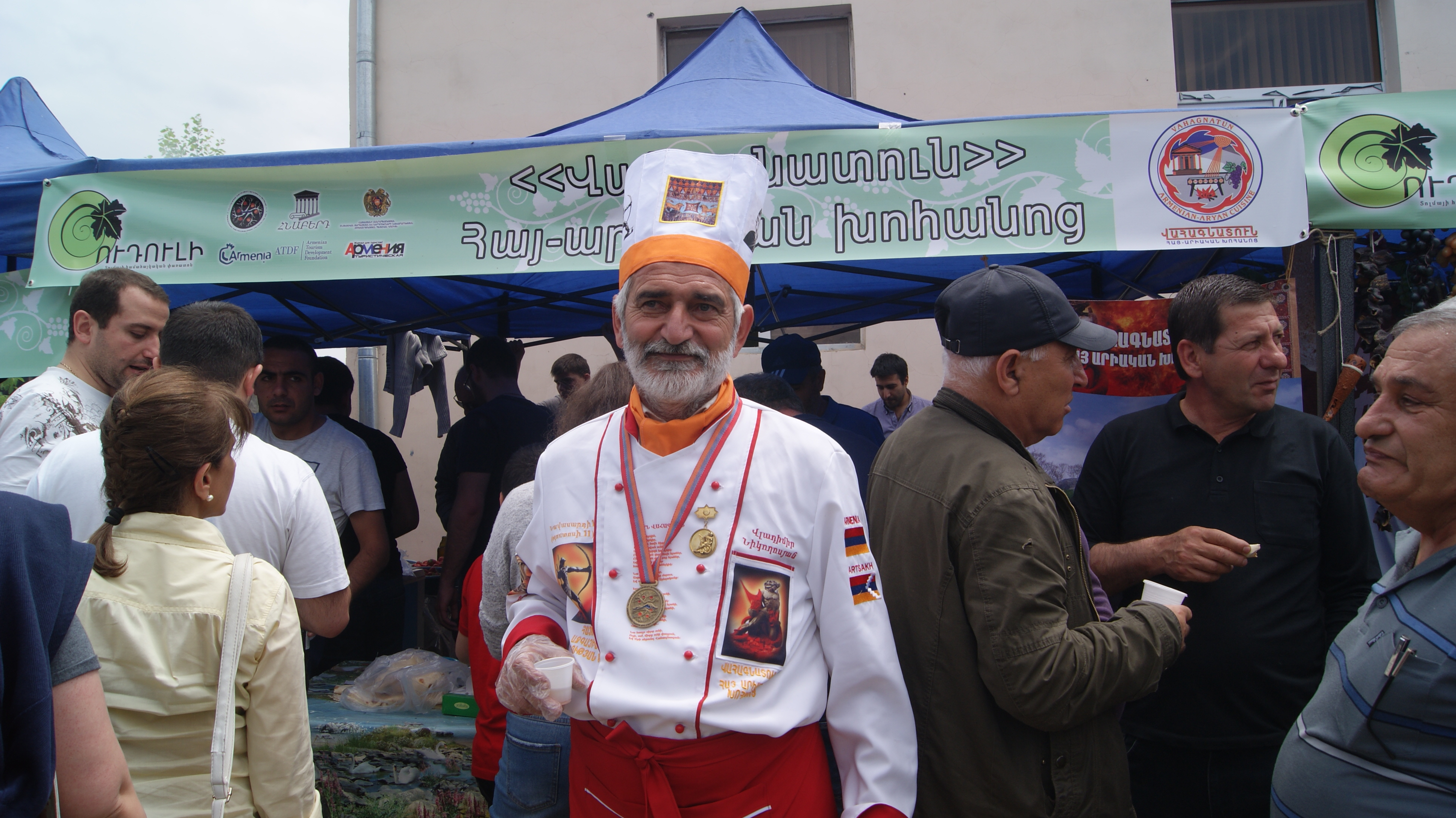
A Chef at Dolma Festival, Hnaberd

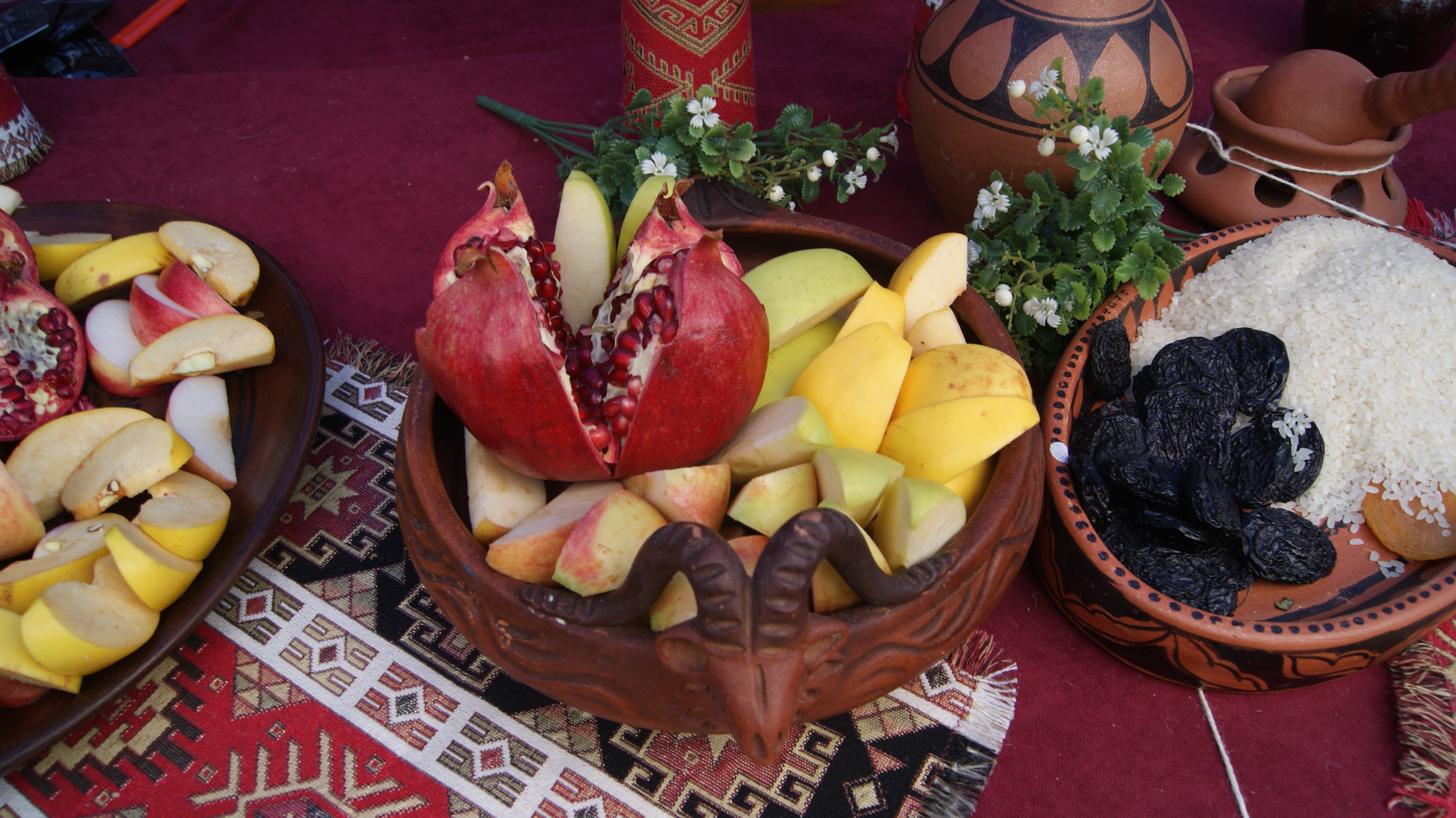
Fruit salad at Dolma Festival, Hnaberd

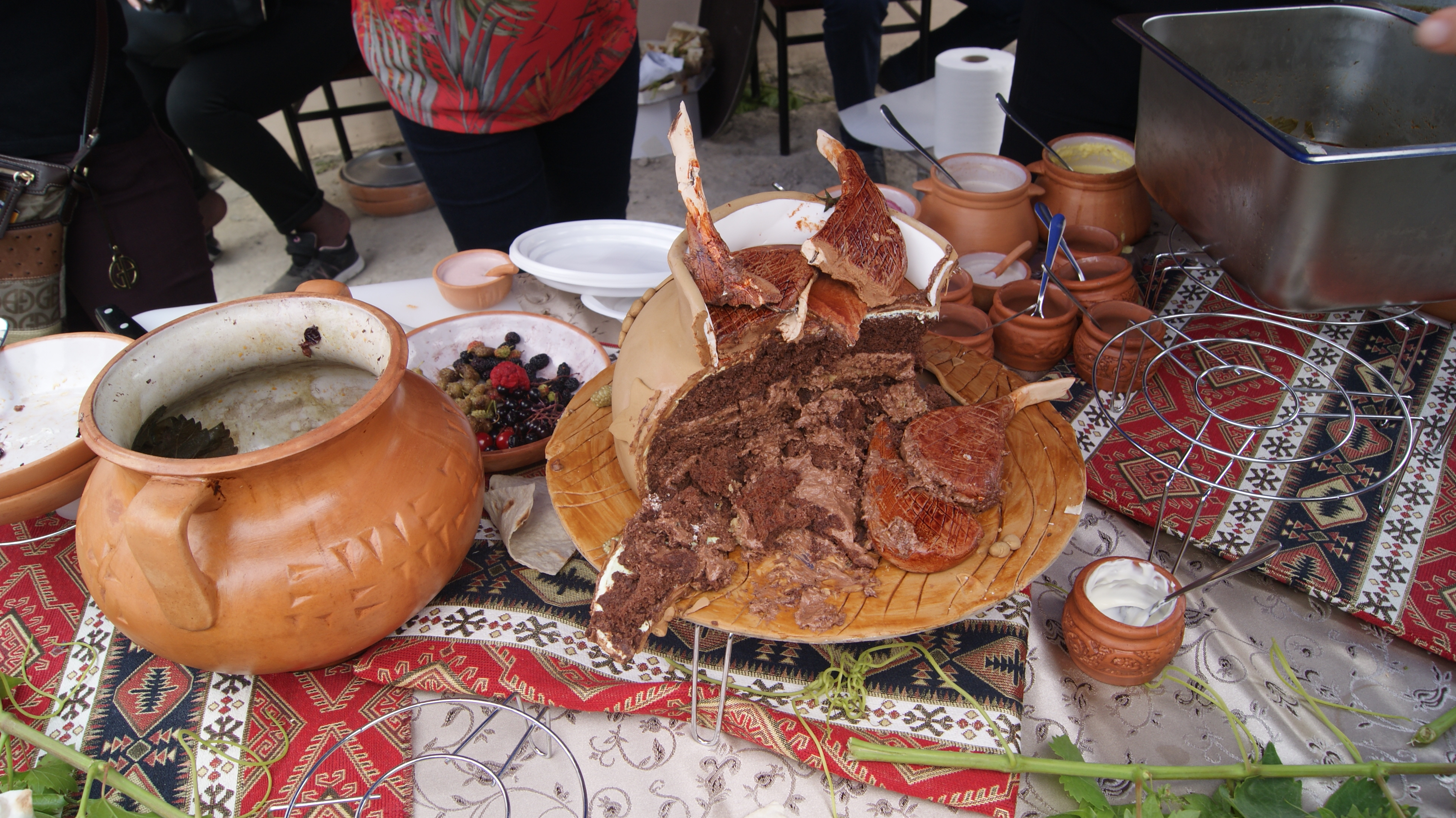
Food at Dolma Festival, Hnaberd
