= Artamet (disambiguation) =

Artamet may refer to:

- Edremit, Van, a district and city in Van Province, Turkey, known in Armenian as Artamet
- Artamet, a village in the Armavir Province of Armenia
