= Stuffed turnips =

Palestinian heritage dish

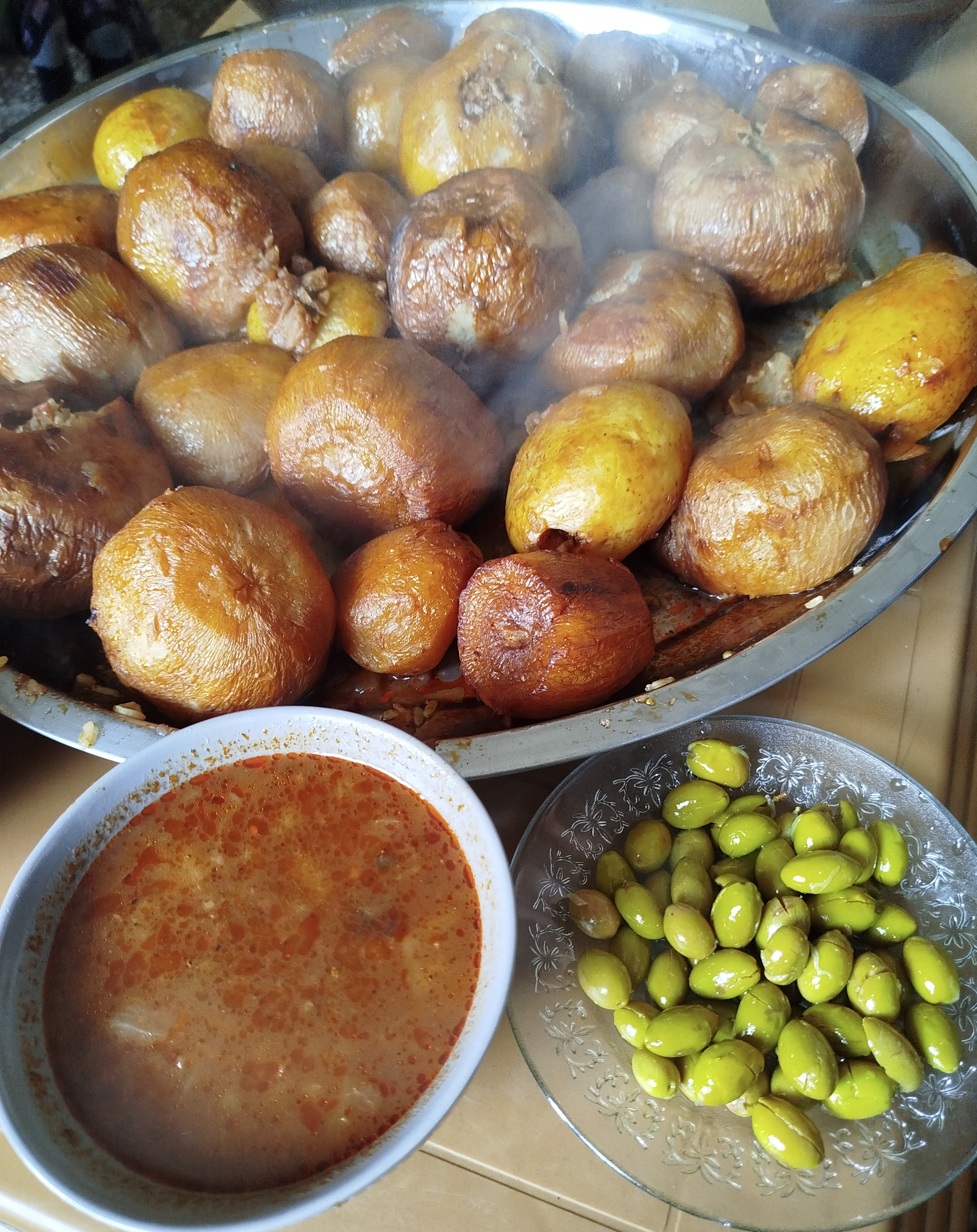
- A dish of stuffed turnips with minced meat and local sumac
- Region or state: West Bank, Palestine
- Main ingredients: Turnip

Stuffed turnips (Arabic: محشي لفت) is a traditional dish in Palestinian and Jordanian cuisine, often eaten in winter.

== Preparation ==
The dish comprises turnip pieces stuffed with minced meat, rice, and local sumac served with a tomato sauce. It can also be prepared with tahini (sesame paste) and tamarind. Spices and seasonings are added, and the stuffed turnip pieces are fried in oil before cooking.

== See also ==
- Arab cuisine
- Palestinian cuisine
- List of stuffed dishes

== Gallery ==
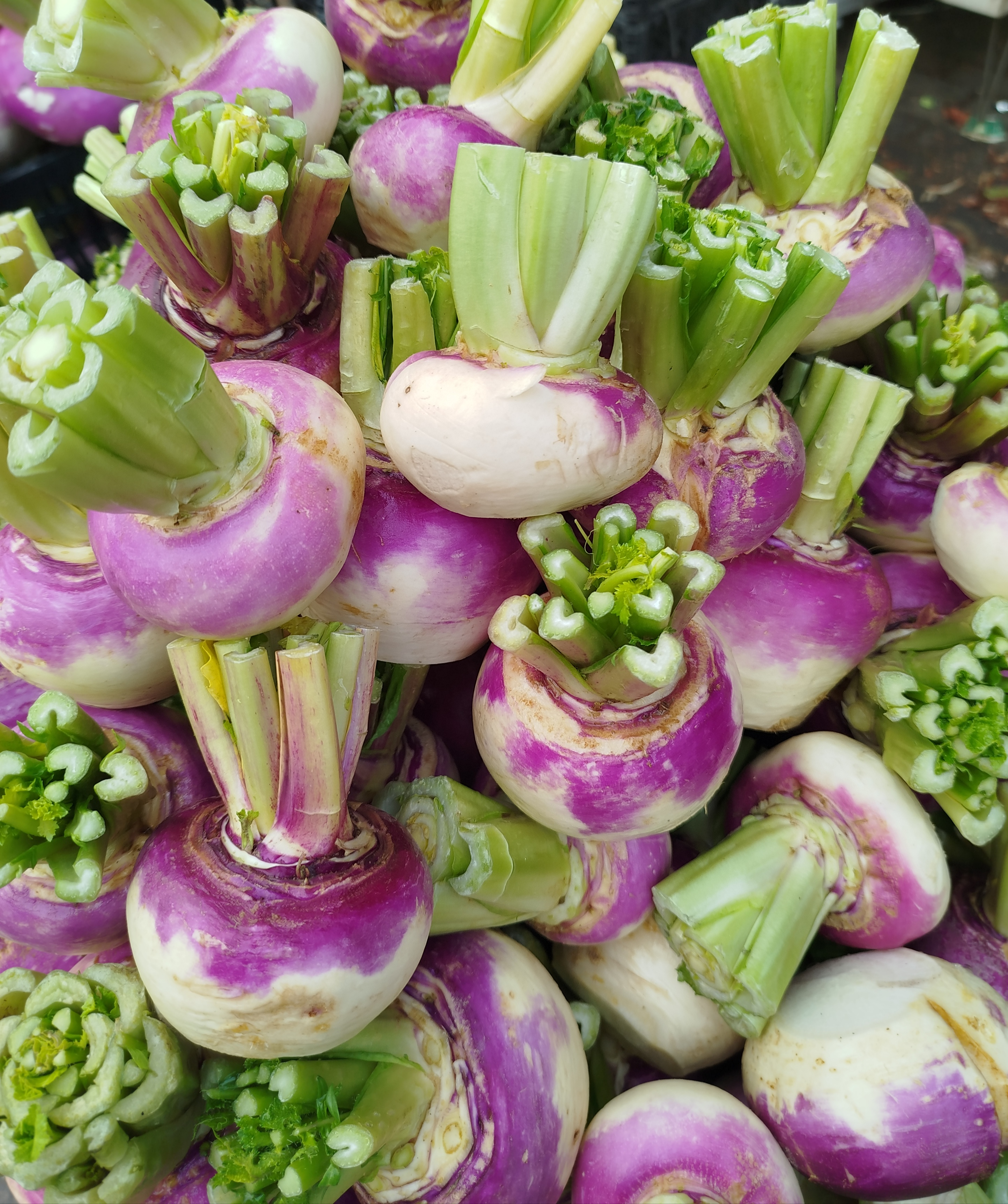
Purple turnips

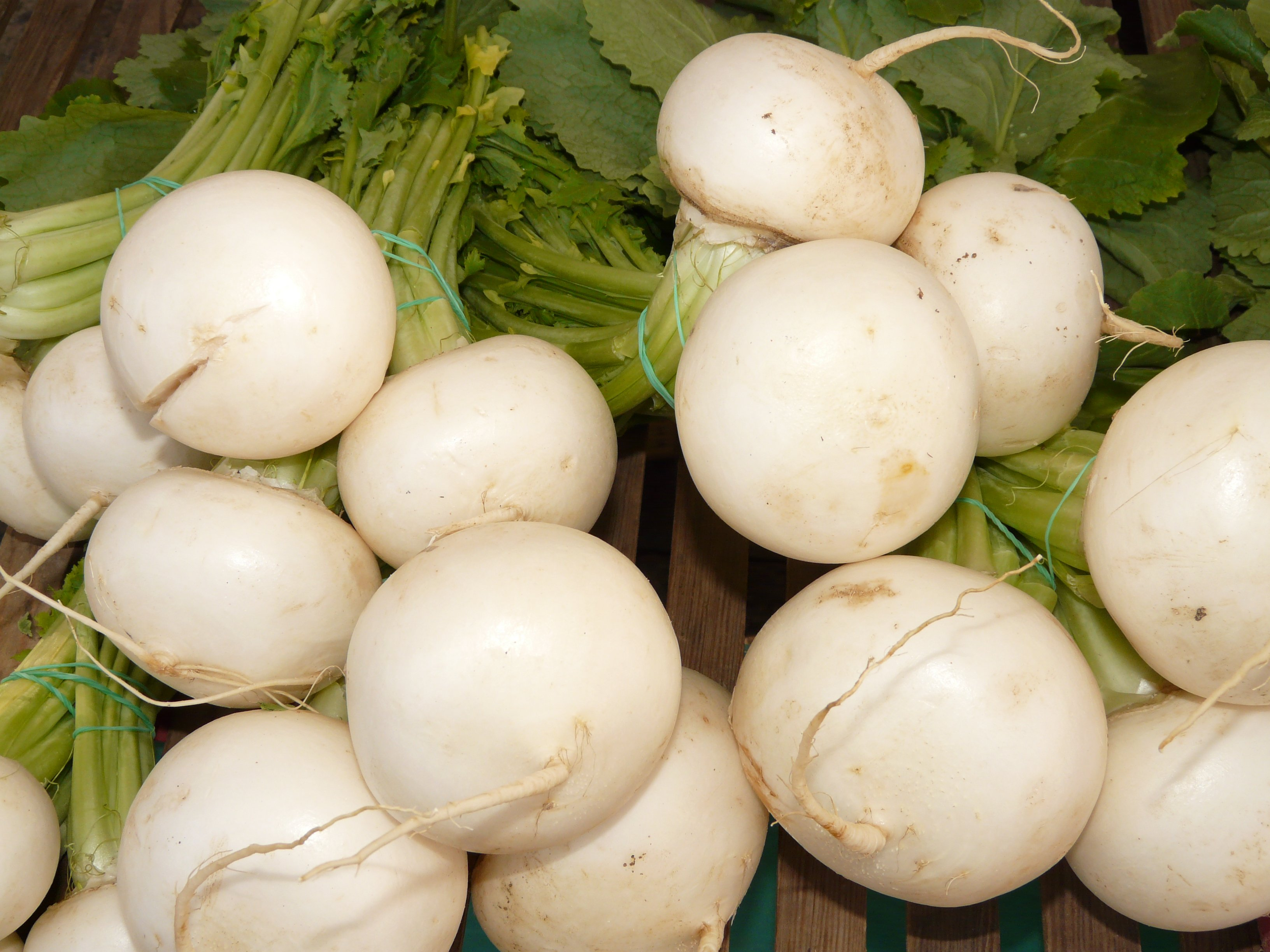
White turnips

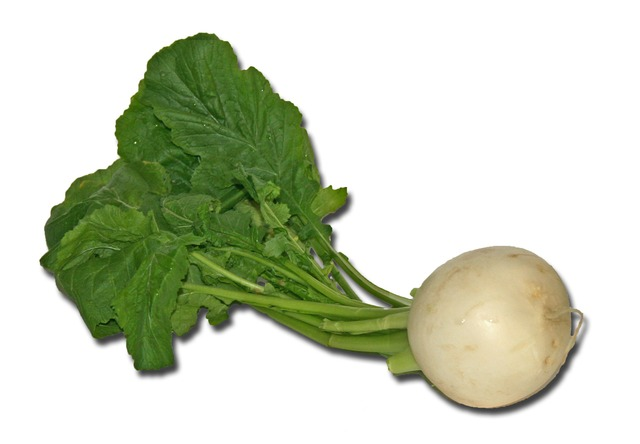
Turnip plant

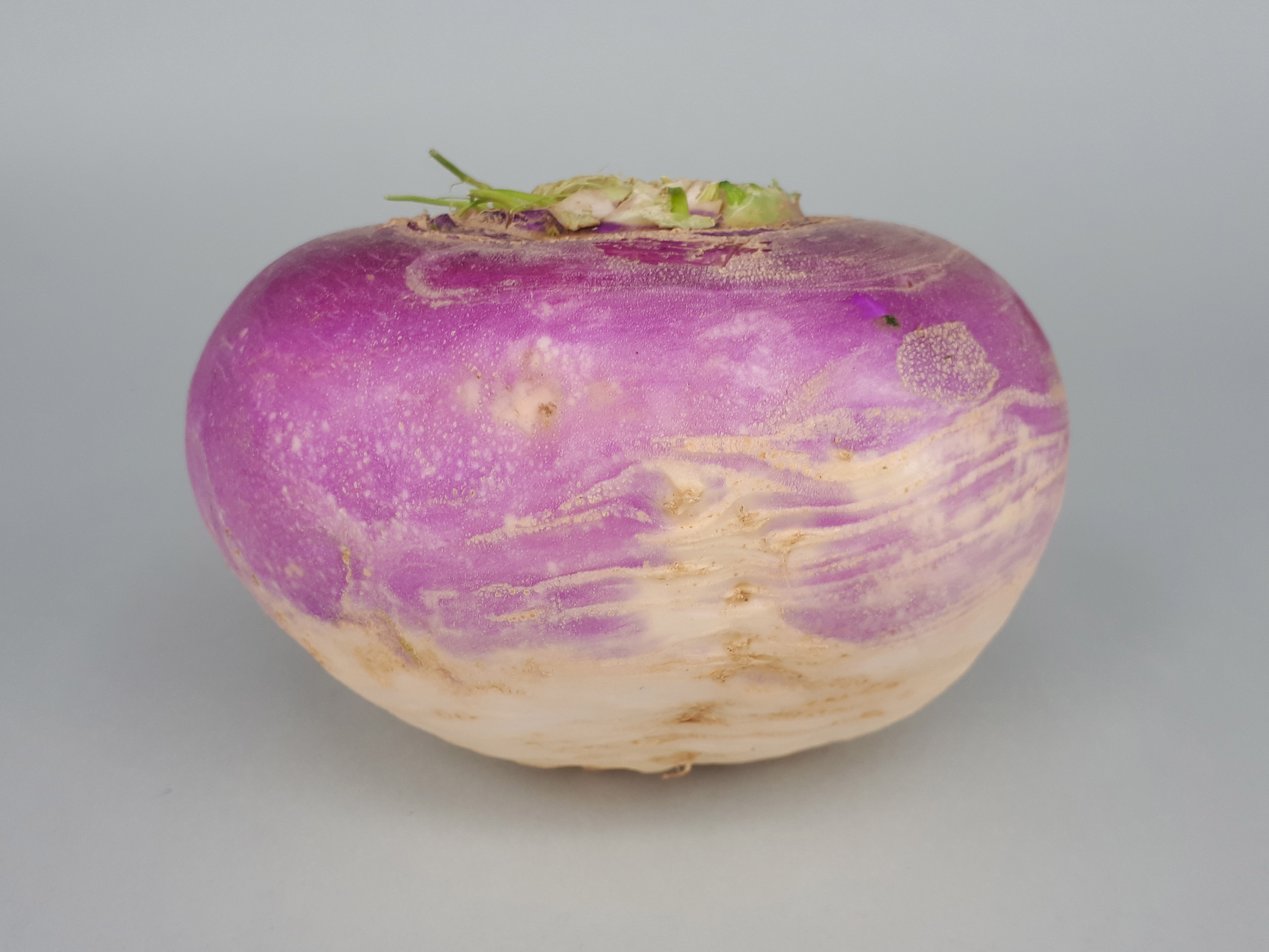
Turnip
