= Artamet =

Village in Armavir, Armenia

Artamet Արտամետ
- Location within Armenia
- Coordinates: 40°07′N 43°51′E
- Country: Armenia
- Marz (Province): Armavir
- Founded: 1982

Area
  - Total: 0.33 km^{2} (0.13 sq mi)

Population (2011)
  - Total: 172
- Time zone: UTC+4 ( )

Artamet (Armenian: Արտամետ) is a village in the Armavir Province of Armenia; it is located around 65 km east of Yerevan and 12 km from the border with Turkey. Artamet was founded in 1982. In 1991, 650 families from Nagorno Karabakh were settled in Artamet; all but 2 of those families have since left.

Artamet has a population of 172 at the 2011 census, down from 212 at the 2001 census.
