= Turducken =

American poultry dish

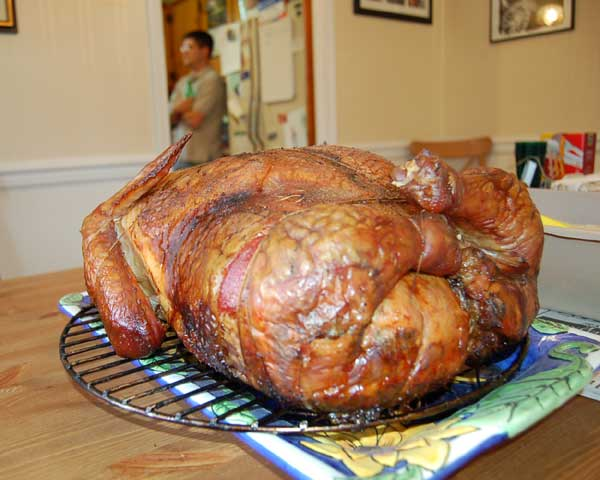
A 14 kg (30 lb) roasted turducken

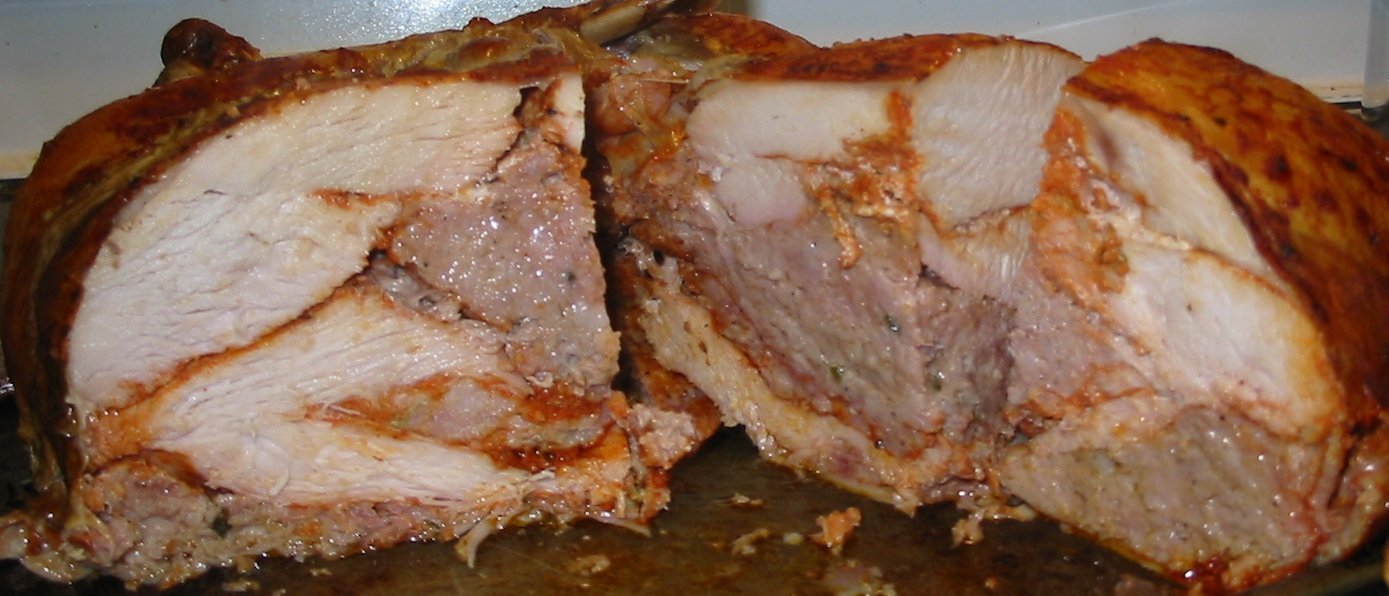
Sausage-stuffed turducken cut into quarters to show the internal layers

Turducken is a dish associated with Louisiana, consisting of a deboned chicken stuffed into a deboned duck, further stuffed into a deboned turkey. Gooducken is a British variant, replacing turkey with goose.

The term turducken is a portmanteau of turkey, duck, and chicken. The dish is a form of engastration, which is a recipe method in which one animal is stuffed inside the gastric passage of another—twofold in this instance.

The thoracic cavity of the chicken/game hen and the rest of the gaps are stuffed, sometimes with a highly seasoned breadcrumb mixture or sausage meat, although some versions have a different stuffing for each bird. The result is a fairly solid layered poultry dish, suitable for cooking by braising, roasting, grilling, or barbecuing.

While matryoshka-like stuffed dishes have existed across cultures for centuries, the turducken first appeared in print in 1982, and is generally credited to the Cajun chef Paul Prudhomme. The turducken was popularized in America by the football commentator John Madden, who promoted the dish during NFL Thanksgiving Day games and, later, Monday Night Football broadcasts.

== Origin ==
Credit for the creation of the turducken is uncertain; other matryoshka-like stuffed dishes have existed for centuries, in a variety of cultures. One early version is found in the 1913 Spanish cookbook La Cocina Española Antigua by Emilia Pardo Bazán. On page 208, recipe 320 describes a dish called guisado particular, which is made by first stuffing an olive, then a small bird with the olive, then that stuffed bird is stuffed into another larger bird, and so on sixteen times more, then cooked in an open flame for 24 hours.

As a named dish, it is generally agreed to have been introduced by Cajun chef Paul Prudhomme. The earliest print reference to the dish is a 1982 Newsweek article that describes it as a new Prudhomme dish. A 1983 New York Daily News article called the turducken "an example of his inventiveness." In the 1960s, Prudhomme had worked as a chef at a series of resorts in Colorado and Wyoming. In 1984, Prudhomme told the Star Tribune that he had come up with the turducken in 1963 while preparing turkey for a Sunday brunch at one such resort. He said he had started selling turduckens in New Orleans around 1982, raising the price repeatedly to lower demand because of the day-long cooking process required. Prudhomme trademarked "Turducken" in 1986. In 2003, the food writer Jeffrey Steingarten investigated the dish's origin and concluded Prudhomme's was "the first, and therefore the authentic, recipe."

Another claimant is Hebert's Specialty Meats in Maurice, Louisiana, whose owners, Widley Hebert Jr. and Sammy Hebert, say they created it in 1985 "when a local man brought his own birds to their shop and asked the brothers to create the medley". But Prudhomme's turducken had already been featured in the media for several years before Hebert's opened in 1984.

In the United Kingdom, a turducken is a type of ballotine called a "three-bird roast" or a "royal roast". The Pure Meat Company offered a five-bird roast (a goose, a turkey, a chicken, a pheasant, and a pigeon, stuffed with sausage), described as a modern revival of the traditional Yorkshire Christmas pie, in 1989; and a three-bird roast (a duck stuffed with chicken stuffed with a pigeon, with sage and apple stuffing) in 1990.

The popularization of the turducken in the United States can be attributed to John Madden's regular promotion of the dish when calling NFL games on or around Thanksgiving. Madden ate his first on-air turducken on December 1, 1996, during a game between the New Orleans Saints and St. Louis Rams at the Louisiana Superdome. Madden was known to saw through a turducken with his bare hand, live in the booth, to demonstrate the turducken's contents.

Gooducken is a goose stuffed with a duck, which is in turn stuffed with a chicken.

== Historical predecessors ==
The three-bird roast was popular in Tudor times in England. In Georgian times a dish with multiple birds was a Christmas pie which contained deboned layers of turkey, goose, chicken, partridge and pigeon covered in a crust which was not eaten.

In his 1807 Almanach des Gourmands, gastronomist Grimod de La Reynière presents his rôti sans pareil ("roast without equal")—a bustard stuffed with a turkey, a goose, a pheasant, a chicken, a duck, a guinea fowl, a teal, a woodcock, a partridge, a plover, a lapwing, a quail, a thrush, a lark, an ortolan bunting and a garden warbler which itself was stuffed with a caper and an Anchovy—although he states that, since similar roasts were produced by ancient Romans, the rôti sans pareil was not entirely novel. The final bird is very small but large enough to just hold an olive; it also suggests that, unlike modern multi-bird roasts, there was no stuffing or other packing placed in between the birds.

An early form of the recipe was "Pandora's cushion", a goose stuffed with a chicken stuffed with a quail.

Another version of the dish is credited to French diplomat and gourmand Charles Maurice de Talleyrand-Périgord. The 1891 newspaper article French Legends Of The Table offers Quail à la Talleyrand:

The following for instance, is Talleyrand's fanciful and somewhat roundabout way of roasting a quail. On a day of "inspiration gourmande" at his hotel in the Rue Saint-Florentin, Paris, he composed the following recipe: Take a plump quail, seasoned with truffles, and made tender by having been put into champagne. You put it carefully inside a young Bresse chicken; then sew up the opening, and put dabs of butter all over the chicken. Again, you put the chicken inside a fine Berri turkey, and roast the turkey very carefully before a bright fire. What will be the result? All the juice of the turkey is absorbed by the fowl, and all the juice of the fowl in its turn by the quail. After two hours roasting the fowl, which in reality is composed of three fowls, is ready, and you place the steaming trinity upon a dish of fine porcelain or chiseled silver. Then you pull the chicken out of the turkey, and the quail out of the chicken. The quail? Is it correct to talk of the quail, when this delicious, perfumed dish is indeed too good for any name? You take the quail as you would some sacred relic, and serve it hot, steaming, with its aroma of truffles, after having roasted it to a golden yellow by basting it diligently with the best Gournay butter.

In Hunan cuisine, the famed chef Liu Sanhe from Changsha invented a dish called sanceng taoji (simplified Chinese: 三层套鸡; traditional Chinese: 三層套雞), meaning "three-layer set chicken", consisting of a sparrow inside a pigeon inside a hen, along with medicinal herbs such as Gastrodia elata and wolfberries. He originally devised the dish to alleviate Lu Diping's ill concubine's headaches. The book Passion India: The Story of the Spanish Princess of Kapurthula (p. 295) features a section that recounts a similar dish in India in the late 1800s:

Invited by Maharajah Ganga Singh to the most extraordinary of dinners, in the palace at Bikaner, when Anita asks her host for the recipe of such a succulent dish, he answers her seriously, "Prepare a whole camel, skinned and cleaned, put a goat inside it, and inside the goat a turkey and inside the turkey a chicken. Stuff the chicken with a grouse and inside that put a quail and finally inside that a sparrow. Then season it all well, place the camel in a hole in the ground and roast it.

== See also ==
- Cockentrice – A dish consisting of a pig sewn to a chicken
- Cherpumple – A dessert inspired by Turducken
- List of duck dishes
- List of meat dishes
- Matryoshka – Russia doll
- Whole stuffed camel
