= Cockentrice =

Pig and chicken dish

Cockentrice is a dish consisting of a suckling pig's upper body sewn onto the bottom half of a capon. Alternately, the front end (head and torso) of the poultry is sewn to the rump of the piglet to not waste the other half. Other animal combinations were also made, although not so named. The cockentrice was basted with a mixture of egg yolk and saffron during the roasting or covered with gold foil; it was also filled with a similar mixture to have a gilded inside. The dish originates from the Middle Ages and at least one source attributes the Tudor dynasty of the Kingdom of England as its originator.

== Nomenclature ==
Cockentrice or cockentryce is only one version of the dish's name. The original name was cokagrys or cotagres, a portmanteau of "cock" and grys, a suckling pig. Other spellings from the period include koketris, cocagres and cokyntryche. The name also references the mythical cockatrice, a dragon with a cock's head.

== See also ==
- Engastration
- Turducken
- Kiviak
- List of meat dishes
