= Stuffing =

Edible mixture filling a food's cavity

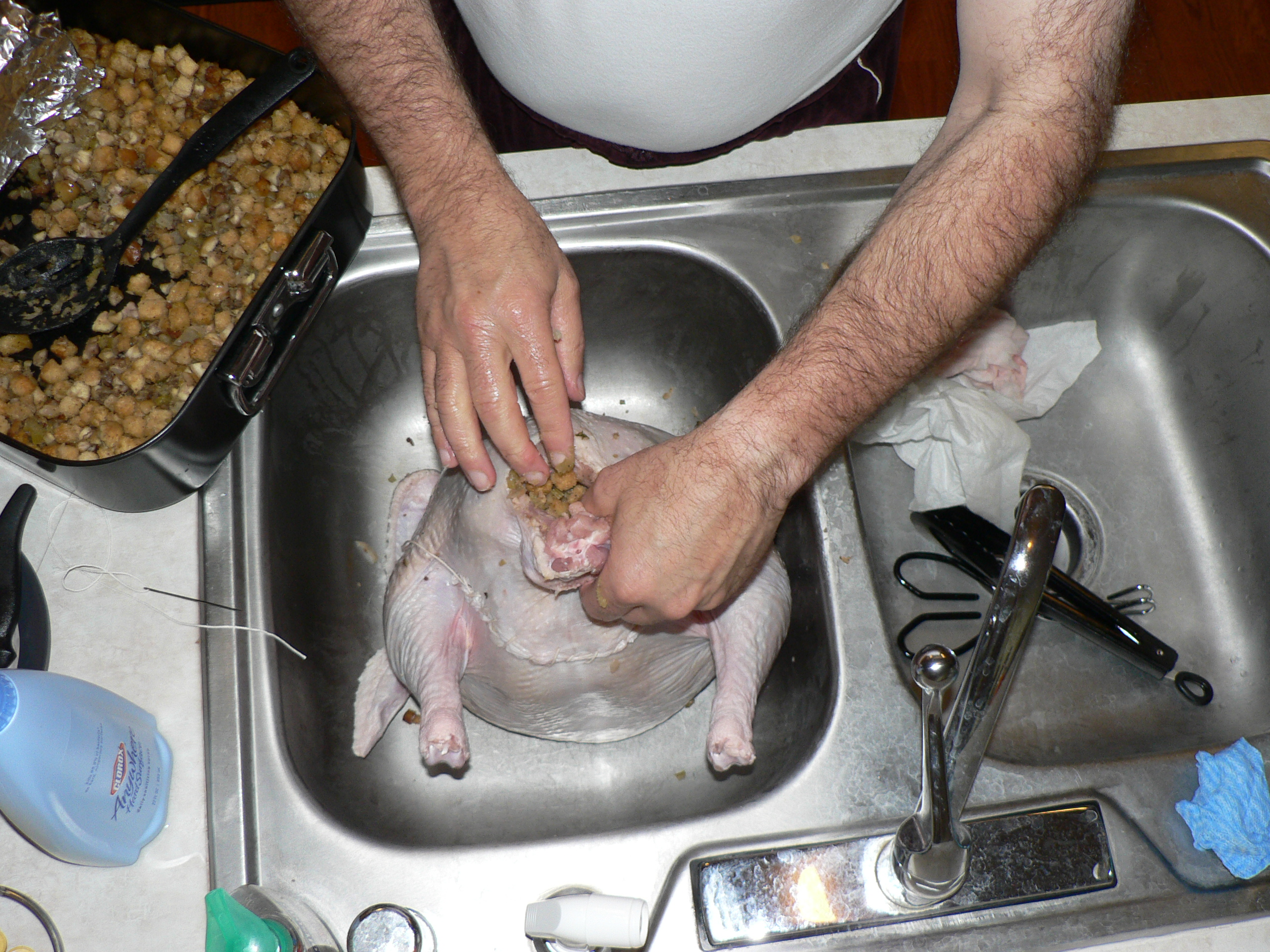
Stuffing a turkey

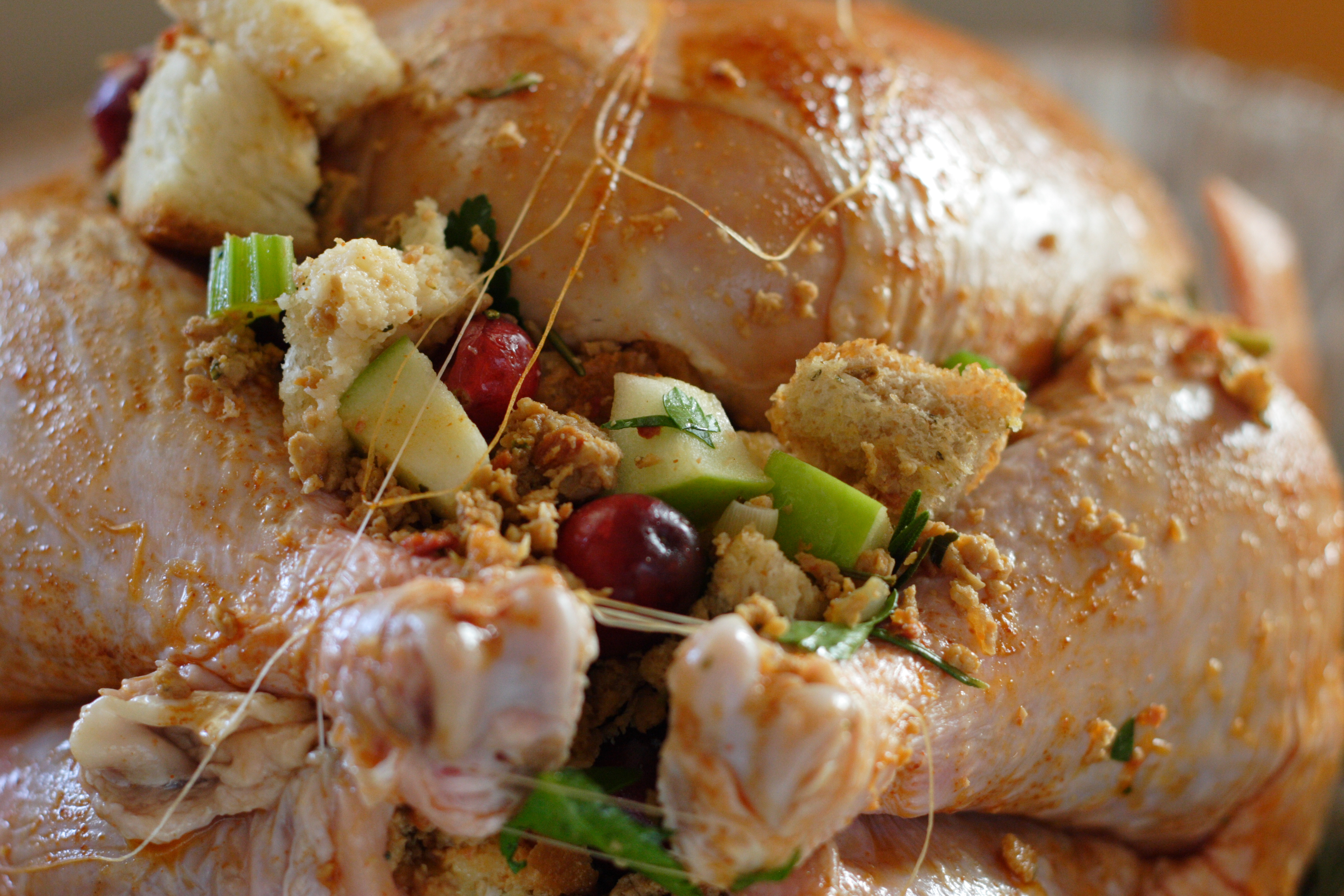
Stuffed turkey

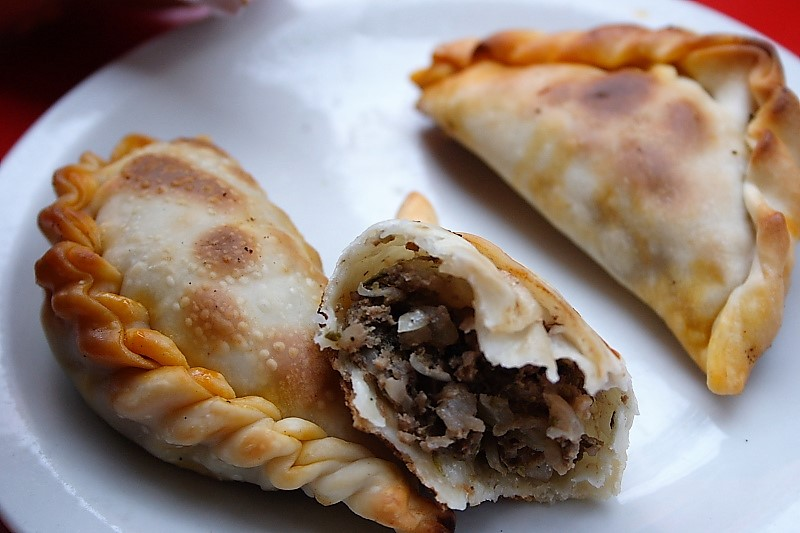
Chilean empanada with ground meat stuffing

Stuffing, filling, or dressing is an edible mixture, often composed of herbs and a starch such as bread, used to fill a cavity in the preparation of another food item. Many foods may be stuffed, including poultry, seafood, and vegetables. As a cooking technique, stuffing helps retain moisture, while the mixture itself augments and absorbs flavors.

Poultry stuffing often consists of breadcrumbs, onion, celery, spices, and herbs such as sage, combined with the giblets. Additions in the United Kingdom include dried fruits and nuts (such as apricots and flaked almonds), and chestnuts.

== History ==
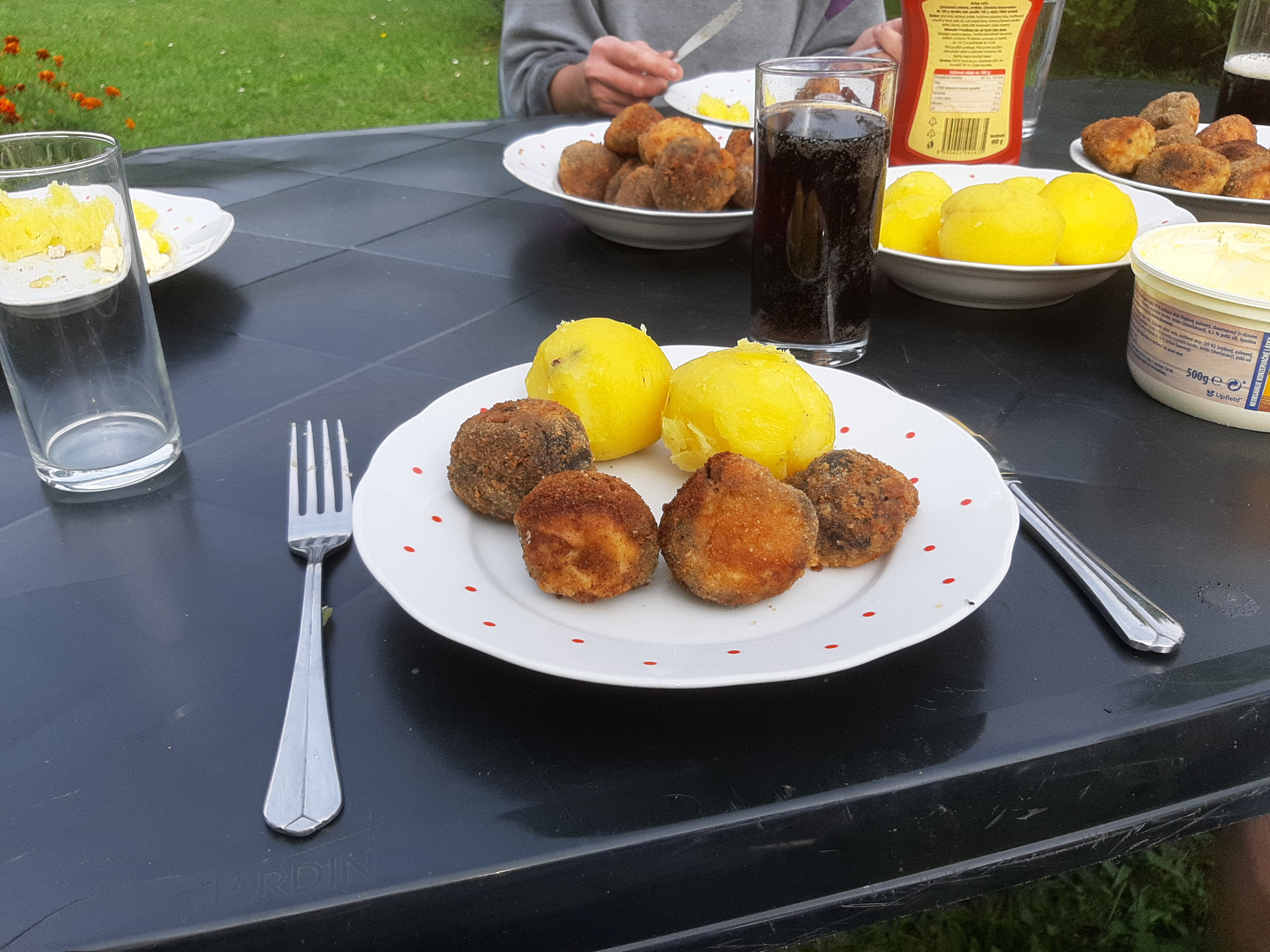
Stuffed parasol mushroom

It is not known when stuffings were first used. The earliest documentary evidence is a Roman cookbook, Apicius' De Re Coquinaria, which contains recipes for stuffed chicken, dormouse, hare, and pig. Most of the stuffings described consist of vegetables, herbs and spices, nuts, and spelt (a cereal), and frequently contain chopped liver, brains, and other organ meat.

Names for stuffing include "farce" (~1390), "stuffing" (1538), "forcemeat" (1688), and more recently in the United States, "dressing" (1850).

== Cavities ==
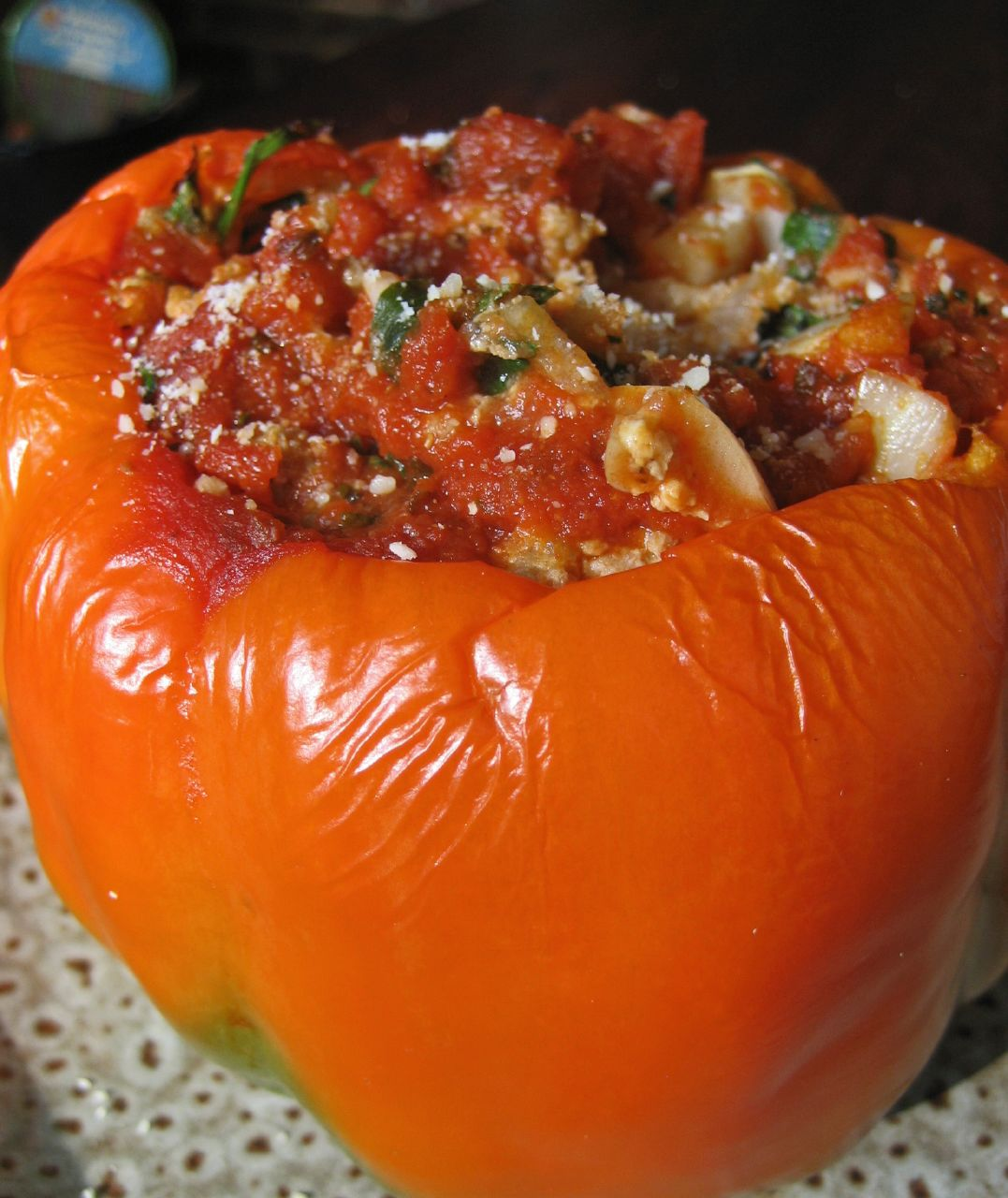
Stuffed orange pepper

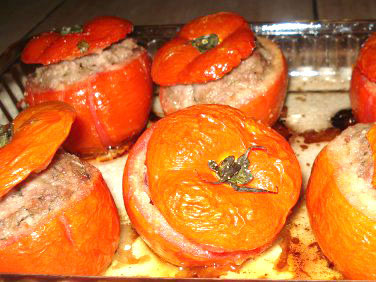
Stuffed tomatoes

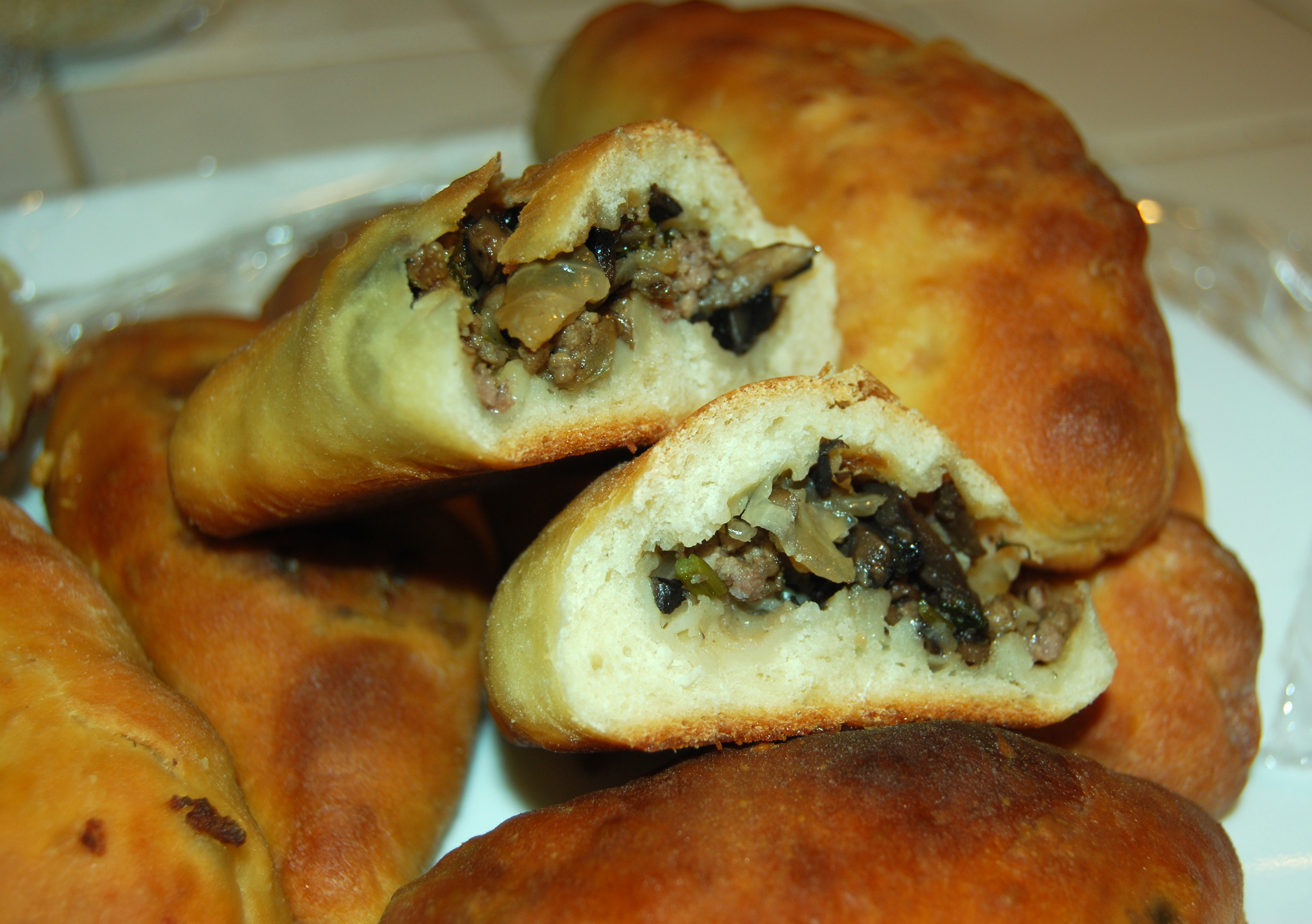
Pirozhki stuffed with meat, mushroom, rice and onions

In addition to stuffing the body cavities of animals, including birds, fish, and mammals, various cuts of meat may be stuffed after they have been deboned or a pouch has been cut into them. Recipes include stuffed chicken legs, stuffed pork chops, stuffed breast of veal, and traditional holiday dishes such as stuffed turkey or goose.

Many types of vegetables are also suitable for stuffing, after their seeds or flesh has been removed. Tomatoes, capsicums (sweet or hot peppers), and vegetable marrows such as zucchini may be prepared in this way. Cabbage and similar vegetables can also be stuffed or wrapped around a filling. They are usually blanched first, in order to make their leaves more pliable. Then the interior may be replaced by stuffing, or small amounts of stuffing may be inserted between the individual leaves.

Purportedly, ancient Roman, or else medieval, cooks developed engastration recipes, stuffing animals with other animals. An anonymous Andalusian cookbook from the 13th century includes a recipe for a ram stuffed with small birds. A similar recipe for a camel stuffed with sheep stuffed with bustards stuffed with carp stuffed with eggs is mentioned in T. C. Boyle's book Water Music. Multi-bird-stuffed dishes such as the turducken or gooducken are contemporary variations.

== Fillers ==
Almost anything can serve as a stuffing. Many American stuffings contain a starchy ingredient like bread or cereals, usually together with vegetables, ground meats, herbs and spices, and eggs. Middle Eastern vegetable stuffings may be based on seasoned rice, on minced meat, or a combination thereof. Other stuffings may contain only vegetables and herbs. Some types of stuffing contain sausage meat or forcemeat, while vegetarian stuffings sometimes contain tofu. Roast pork is often accompanied by sage and onion stuffing in England; roast poultry in a Christmas dinner may be stuffed with sweet chestnuts. Oysters are used in one traditional stuffing for Thanksgiving. These may also be combined with mashed potatoes for a heavy stuffing. Fruits and dried fruits can be added to stuffing, including apples, apricots, dried prunes, and raisins. In England, a stuffing is sometimes made of minced pork shoulder seasoned with various ingredients such as sage, onion, bread, chestnuts, dried apricots, and dried cranberries. The stuffing mixture may be cooked separately and served as a side dish. This may be called stuffing or dressing.

== Food safety ==
The United States Department of Agriculture (USDA) states that cooking animals with a body cavity filled with stuffing can present potential food safety hazards. Even when the meat reaches a safe temperature, the stuffing can still harbor bacteria, and if the meat is cooked until the stuffing reaches a safe temperature, the meat may be overcooked. For turkeys, for instance, the USDA recommends cooking stuffing separately from the bird and not buying pre-stuffed birds.

== See also ==
- Breadcrumb
- Breading
- Kousa mahshi, squash or zucchini stuffed with rice and meat
- List of stuffed dishes
- List of bread dishes
- Panada
- Paxo
- Sarma and dolma
- Stove Top stuffing
- Stuffed pepper
