= Goose as food =

Food animal

Goose
- A Christmas goose
- Type: Poultry
- Course: Main dish, side dish
- Serving temperature: Hot or cold
- Variations: Roasted, steamed, braised, stewed, spit-roasted, simmered

In cooking and gastronomy, goose is the meat of several species of bird in the family Anatidae, which also includes ducks and swans. The family has a cosmopolitan distribution, and various wild species and domesticated breeds are used culinarily in multiple cuisines. There is evidence as early as 2500 BC of deliberate fattening of domesticated geese in Egypt.

The meat, liver and other organs, fat, blood, and eggs are used in various cuisines. Methods of cooking include roasting, spit-roasting, braising, steaming, grilling, simmering, and stewing. Dishes include roasts, joints, soups, stews, curries, sausages, forcemeats, and dumplings.

In many culinary traditions, a roast goose is a feast meal dating back centuries.

== History and uses ==
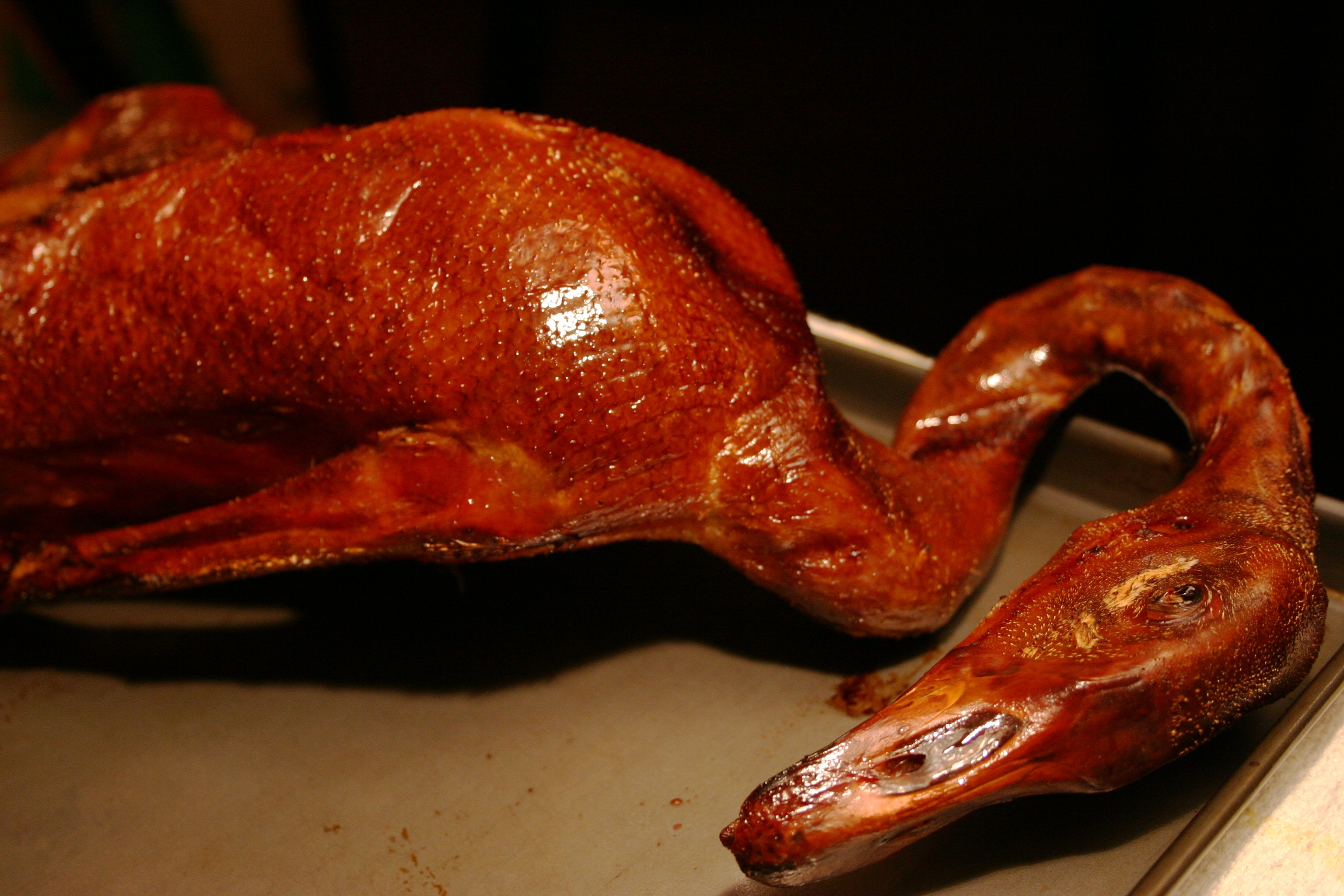
A roasted goose with head and neck

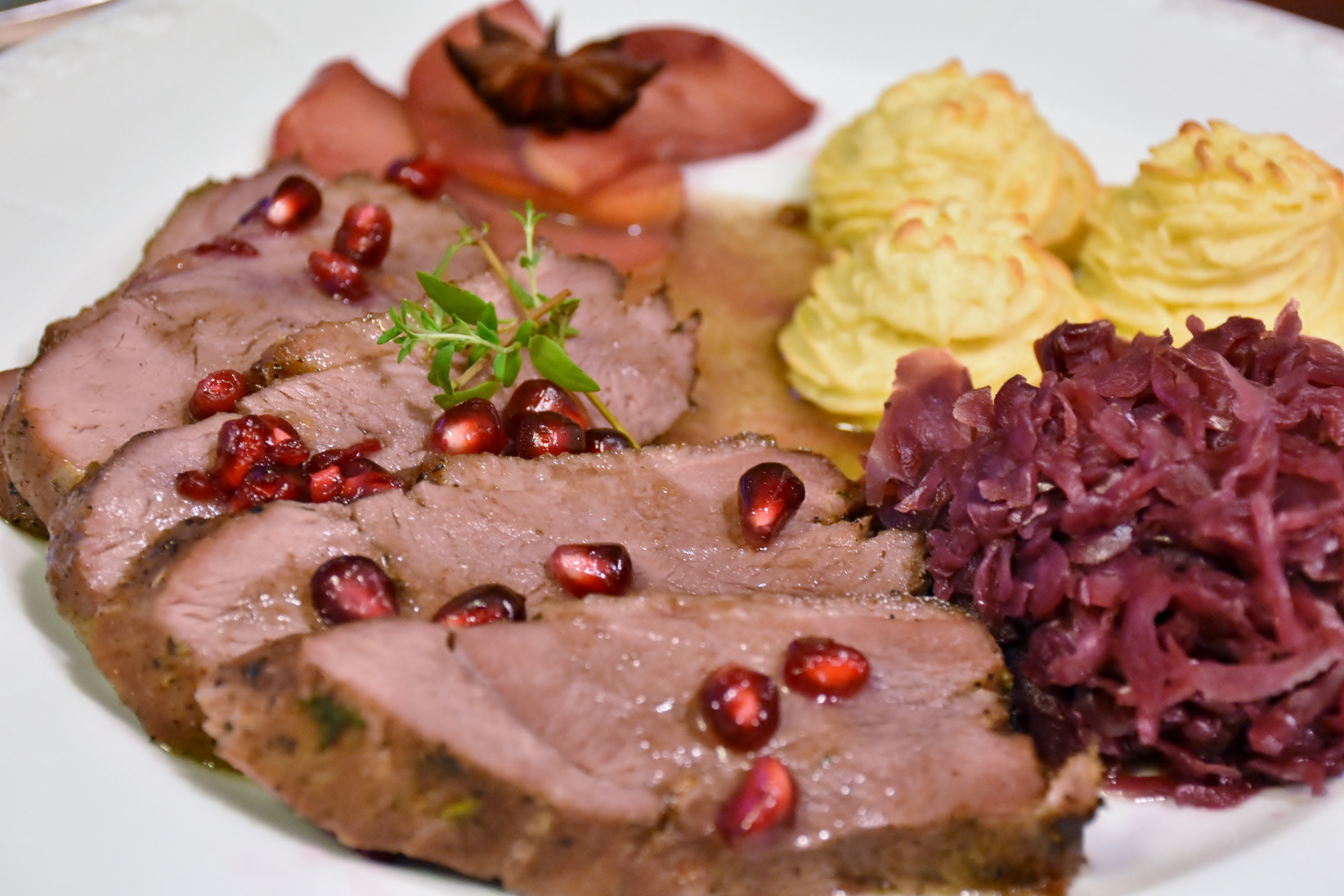
A dish of roast goose

The common domestic goose belongs by descent to Anser anser, the greylag goose, which is still also widely seen in the wild in Europe. It features in the cuisine of France, Britain, Germany and many other European countries. Geese also provide some famous oriental dishes: Alan Davidson in The Oxford Companion to Food instances the marinated and roasted goose of Shantou in Guangdong province in China.

Geese have been bred for the table for thousands of years, but by comparison with some other animals, domestication began late because geese take 30 days to hatch their young and more to rear them, which was too long for nomadic peoples. There are records of domesticated geese in ancient Egypt, and wall-paintings show them being force-fed to enlarge their livers. Pliny the Elder wrote in the second century AD that the goose was chiefly prized for its liver; he mentioned to the practice of force-feeing, and commented that soaking the liver in honey and milk made it even larger. Apicius gives a Roman-era recipe for anserem elixum calidum ex iure frigido apiciano (boiled goose served hot with cold apician sauce), in which a plain boiled goose is covered in a sauce made of pepper, lovage, coriander seed, mint, and rue.

The meat, liver and other organs, fat, skin and blood are used in various cuisines. The meat has a distinctive flavor. Goose eggs are also used culinarily, but unlike chicken eggs are only available seasonally; in the UK goose eggs have a autumn-to-early-winter availability.

Roast goose is the most common method of preparation. Roasted whole or cut-up goose dishes are found in Asian, European, and Middle Eastern cuisines. Spit-roasted goose was a traditional component of the indigenous cuisines of North America.

A byproduct of roasting is that roasting a goose will render a great deal of excellent-quality fat which can be used for roasting potatoes or other vegetables, as the shortening in pie crust (sweet or savory), as a spread for bread, and a multitude of other culinary uses. One can also simmer pieces of goose submerged in the fat to make confit. In some cuisines geese are raised primarily for lard. According to NPR, goose fat is "the crème de la crème of fats". in 2006 Nigella Lawson called it "the essential Christmas cooking ingredient".

In Chinese cuisine, goose is also steamed or braised with aromatics. In some cuisines stews or soups are made from goose meat. In German cuisine, goose neck is stuffed with goose liver and cooked to make a sausagelike dish; similar dishes are made in eastern Europe. Goose meat is also used to fill pies or dumplings or to make sausage.

Production of goose meat

Production of goose meat per animal

== Eastern Asia ==
Goose as food
- Traditional Chinese: 燒鵝
- Simplified Chinese: 烧鹅
- Hanyu Pinyin: shāo é
- Cantonese Yale: sīu ngó
- Literal meaning: roast goose
Transcriptions
Standard Mandarin
- Hanyu Pinyin: shāo é
- IPA: [ʂáʊ ɤ̌]
Yue: Cantonese
- Yale Romanization: sīu ngó
- IPA: [siw˥ ŋɔ˧˥]

=== China ===
Most Chinese preparations of goose involve cooking it thoroughly. In southern China, roast goose is a variety of siu mei, or roasted meat dishes, within Cantonese cuisine. It is made by roasting geese with seasoning often in a charcoal furnace at high temperature. Roasted geese of high quality have crisp skin with juicy and tender meat. Slices of roast goose may be served with plum sauce.

In the cuisine of Teochew people in Singapore, braised goose is a traditional dish; typical braising ingredients include soy sauce, rice wine, garlic, and spices such as cinnamon, ginger, and star anise.

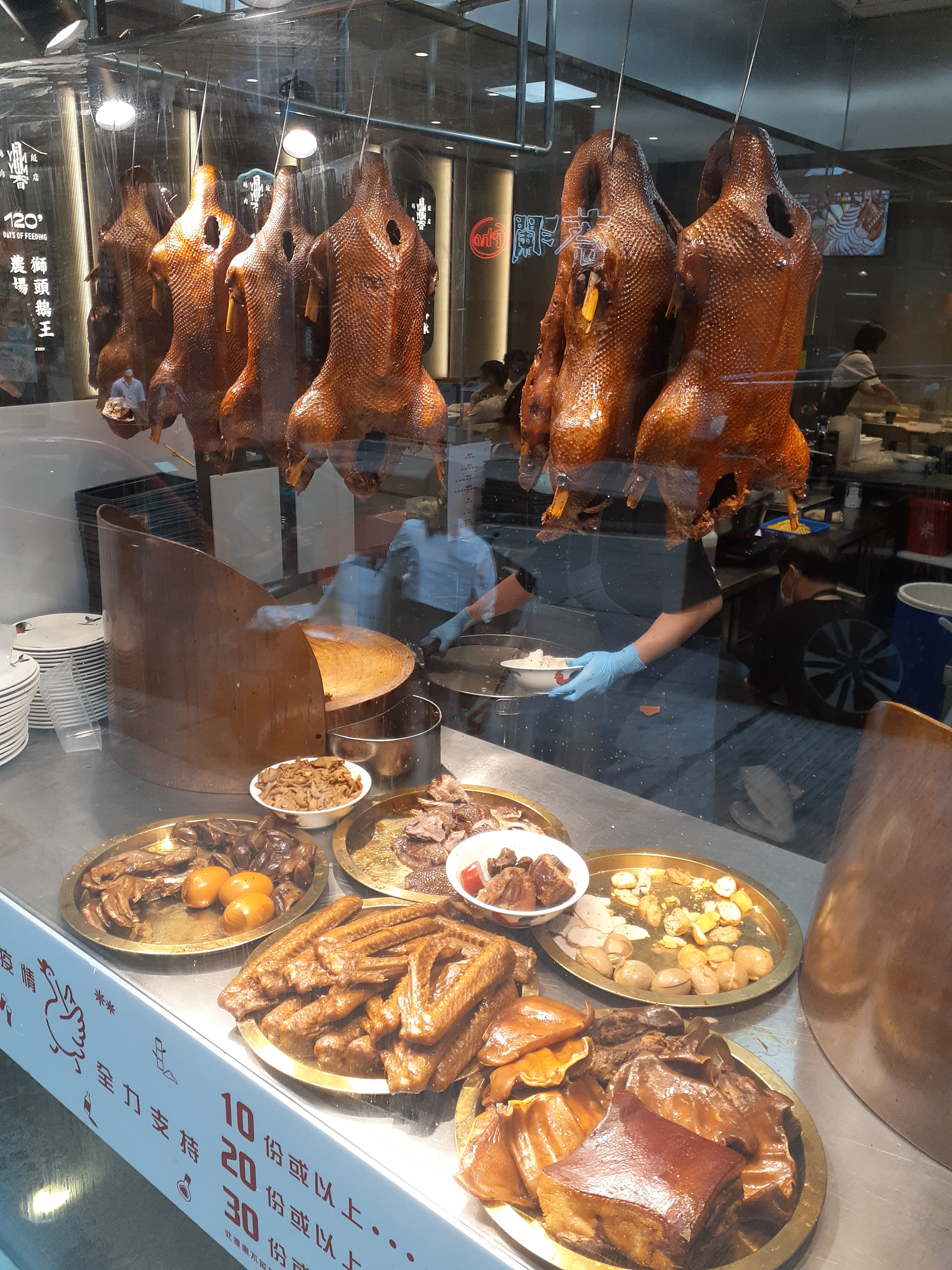
Window display at a restaurant specializing in goose dishes in Hong Kong

=== Hong Kong ===
Roast goose is traditionally popular and remains a common main dish in Hong Kong. Roast goose, as served in Hong Kong, especially in the city of Sham Tseng, is similar to its counterpart in the neighboring Guangdong Province of southern China. Some restaurants offer a similarly prepared roast duck.

== Europe ==
For many European cultures, roast goose is traditionally eaten only on appointed holidays, including Christmas and St. Martin's Day. Roast goose was a traditional Sabbath meal among Jews in Eastern Europe.

=== Britain ===
In Britain, goose became particularly associated with Michaelmas in late September. According to Mrs Beeton in her Book of Household Management (1861):

It is said that the Michaelmas goose is indebted to Queen Elizabeth for its origin on the table at that season. Her Majesty happened to dine on one at the table of an English baronet, when she received the news of the discomfiture of the Spanish Armada. In commemoration of this event, she commanded the goose to make its appearance at table on every Michaelmas.

Hannah Glasse (1751) published a recipe headed "Goose à la Mode", in which a whole chicken stuffed with ox-tongue is placed inside a large goose and the assemblage is gently poached with onions, herbs, ham, red wine, and chopped veal sweetbread, truffles and mushrooms. Mrs Beeton, a century later, specified a plain roast, with sage and onion stuffing.

=== Croatia ===
A traditional dish in Croatia is guščji paprikaš, a noodle and goose meat stew with roots in the areas around Županja. Croatia also has a roasted goose dish, martinjska guska s marunima, which is stuffed with chestnuts; it is often served on the feast of St Martin.

=== Denmark ===
Gaasesteg is a goose roast with apples and prunes, similar to the French Oie à la hambourgeoise. It is usually served with red cabbage and Brunede Kartofler – potatoes browned in butter and sugar.

=== France ===
The goose also features prominently in the cuisine of France. Davidson writes that the Gauls of what is now France were already producing plump geese, fed on barley or millet gruel, before the Romans invaded, and that the French can possibly claim the longest and most faithful devotion to the goose. They were for many years the principal producers of foie gras, goose (or duck) livers artificially enlarged by force feeding, known in France as gavage – considered a delicacy by some and an abuse by others. The French may have been overtaken as producers by eastern European countries and Israel, but remain its principal consumers. The range of French methods of cooking goose is wide, and includes:

French	English	Contents	Ref
À l'agenaise	Agen style	Stuffed with Agen prunes, chopped brined pork, onions, olives and egg yolk, and roast.	
À l'alsacienne	Alsace style	1. Stuffed with pork sausage forcemeat, roast, garnished with sauerkraut braised with goose fat and triangles of lean bacon cooked with the sauerkraut. 2. Stuffed with chopped goose liver, finely chopped shallots, chopped parsley, salt and pepper, and roast. 3. Stuffed with cooked chestnuts and fried onions, and roast.	
A l'anglaise	English style	Stuffed with sage and onion stuffing and then roast; warm apple sauce served separately.	
En aspic (froid)	In aspic (cold)	Browned and braised; when cold the breast is removed, carved, put back into position, whole bird coated with cold thickened gravy mixed with aspic jelly, and when set, glazed with aspic	
Ballotines d'oie	Ballotine of goose	Boned goose leg stuffed with forcemeat made of diced goose leg and liver, with egg white, double cream and chestnuts, braised.	
Bismarck	Bismarck	Roast, dressed on shredded white cabbage braised with goose fat and white wine, garnished with halved cooked apples stuffed with chestnut purée.	
À la bordelaise	Bordeaux style	Stuffed with a mixture of sliced sautéd mushrooms, soaked white bread, chopped goose liver, anchovy butter, green olives, eggs, garlic and seasoning and then roast.	
À la bourguignonne	Burgundy style	Casseroled in red wine with bacon, turnips, onions and garlic.	
Bouillie	Boiled	Boiled in white stock with pot herbs, a larded onion and herbs; served with rice or buttered noodles and served with almond horseradish cream.	
À la champenoise	Champagne style	Casseroled in champagne, with stuffing of onions, parsley, garlic and sausage meat.	
Chipolata	Chipolata	Braised, carved and served garnished with glazed button onions, glazed carrots, chestnuts, bacon and chipolata sausages.	
Oie en civet	Casseroled	Slowly casseroled in the goose's blood and lemon juice or vinegar.	
Oie en civet à la belge	Casserole Belgian style	Casseroled in Belgian beer with chopped onions and brown stock, bound with pig's blood, garnished with small mushrooms and bacon.	
Oie en confit	Confit of goose	Strips of goose, brined, completely covered in goose fat and slowly cooked.	
À la danoise	Danish style	Stuffed with apples and raisins, roast, garnished with baked apples.	
En daube	Slow cooked	Boned, stuffed with pork sausage meat mixed with diced ox tongue, salt pork, truffles and brandy and steamed in oven, served cold in the jellied stock.	
Farcie	Stuffed	Stuffed with apples and chestnuts, braised; the thickened gravy served separately.	
À la flamande	Flanders style	Braised, garnished with braised cabbage balls, carrots, turnips, slices of lean boiled bacon and boiled potatoes, covered with the boiled-down thickened gravy.	
À la française	French style	Cut in pieces, braised with shredded lettuce and green peas.	
Aux griottes	With morello cherries	Browned, braised with mirepoix, red wine and demi-glace, carved, covered with the sauce mixed with stoned cooked morello cherries.	
À la hambourgeoise	Hamburg style	Stuffed with peeled apple wedges simmered in butter and stoned prunes, roast, served with the natural gravy.	
Aux marrons	With chestnuts	Stuffed with pork sausage meat mixed with chestnuts and cooked in stock until more than half done, and then roast, served with the natural gravy.	
À la mecklenbourgeoise	Mecklenburg style	Filled with white bread stuffing mixed with goose fat, raisins, diced sautéd apples and goose liver, braised in brown stock and white wine, garnished with braised red cabbage.	
À la nordique	Nordic style	Seasoned with salt and crushed caraway seeds, stuffed with sliced apples and onions seasoned with marjoram, roast, served with the natural gravy.	
À la normande	Normandy style	Stuffed with a mixture of chopped goose liver, chicken livers, smoked bacon, onion and apples, with breadcrumbs, egg, Calvados and crème fraîche	
À la paysanne	Farmer style	Braised, garnished with small slices of carrots, turnips, celery and onions, green peas and green beans simmered in butter and mixed with thickened gravy.	
À la petite-russienne	Little-Russian style	Stuffed with thick gruel of buckwheat, braised with sliced onions, sauce finished off with sour cream.	
À la provençale	Provence style	Cut into pieces, browned in oil, simmered in white wine with diced tomatoes and garlic, chopped anchovies and blanched black olives.	
Rillettes d'oie	Rillettes	Left-over goose meat, salted and shredded and slowly oven-cooked.	
Rotie mode du Perigord	Roast, Perigord style	Roast with potatoes and hard-boiled eggs.	
À la russe	Russian style	Cut in pieces, poached in white stock with pot herbs and mushroom waste, covered with white sauce prepared with the stock and sour cream and mixed with sliced boletus.	
Salé	Salted	Cut in pieces, rubbed with a mixture of salt, pepper and sugar, placed in an earthenware pot and pickled for a few days, cleaned, cooked in white stock with herbs and a larded onion, served with sauerkraut.	
À la strassbourgeoise	Strasbourg style	Stuffed with apples, roast, served with braised saurkraut mixed with chestnuts.	
À la toulousaine	Toulouse-style	Slowly poached in white wine and chicken stock, with tomatoes and onions.	
À la vaudoise	Vaud style	The goose is stuffed with sauerkraut, gin and juniper berries, roast and finally flambéd.	
À la mode de Visé	Visé style	Boiled in white stock with the giblets and garlic, cut in pieces and kept warm with the degreased stock fat; covered with veloute prepared with the stock, thickened with egg yolks and finished off with sweet cream and purée of garlic cooked in milk.	

=== Germany ===
In Germany roast goose is the traditional Christmas Day dish and is almost always served with red cabbage. In some parts of the country the bird is accompanied by potato dumplings; in other areas noodles are served. Roast goose may be stuffed with chestnuts, prunes and apples ("Gefüllter Gansebraten mit Esskastanie") Stuffed goose neck is considered a delicacy in Germany: a filleted neck is stuffed with goose liver, pork, truffle, onion and fat bacon all minced. The result is sewn at both ends and resembles a fat sausage, which is fried in butter. Goose also features in Schwarzsauer: a stew of goose with pears, prunes and apples.

=== Hungary ===
The "goose region" of Hungary is the southern Great Hungarian Plains. Goose liver is a major export. Ludas kása is a Hungarian dish made with goose meat and rice, pearl barley or millet, similar to the Turkish Kaz Etli Bulgur Pilavı.

=== Italy ===
In the Middle Ages a young goose had the same high prestige as a sucking pig: Piero Camporesi quotes a traditional saying, "Porco d'un mese, oca di tre, è un mangiar da re" – a piglet one month old, and a young goose of three, are food for a king. In Italy, goose used to be the traditional food for the feast of All Saints in early November. The bird would be roast with a stuffing of chestnuts and fruit. Areas in Lombardy and the Veneto, where there is plentiful grazing, have seen a revival of goose gastronomy.

=== Poland ===
Geese have been raised for food in Poland for centuries. In the 1600s and 1700s they were particularly popular for feast and celebration dinners. Czernina soup was traditionally popular. National consumption of goose has decreased, with most geese being consumed on St. Martin's Day.

=== Spain ===
Oca con peras – baby goose with pears, poached in white stock with pine nuts, raisins and parsley – is particularly associated with Gerona and the feast day that marks the winter solstice. Elisabeth Luard calls the dish "one of the great classics of the Catalan kitchen".

=== Sweden ===
In addition to roast goose stuffed with apples and prunes, familiar in other cuisines, there is a Swedish dish called Sprängd gås, in which a goose is immersed in brine for two or three days and then gently poached with carrots, onions, parsley and peppercorns. It may be served either hot or cold.

== North America ==
=== Canada ===
Many indigenous people of North America traditionally depended heavily on goose as a food.

=== United States ===
Goose has generally been replaced by the turkey in the United States; the high price per pound of goose and low ratio of meat to bone and fat makes goose more expensive per serving than turkey. While goose was once a common Christmas dinner in the United States, it has become less popular as the main dish than other meats or fish.

== Oceania ==
Goose is not commonly eaten in Australia, but from 2019 it was raised on the continent and offered in some restaurants.

== Caucasus and the Middle East ==
=== Egypt ===
Feseekh is a traditional Egyptian dish that is usually served during Sham el-Nessim, a spring holiday that dates back to the time of the Pharaohs. Feseekh is made by salting and fermenting fish, often with goose meat added to enhance its flavor and nutrition.

=== Iran ===
In Iran goose meat is often used in ghimeh, a stew of yellow split peas, diced potatoes, and meat cooked in a tomato sauce.

=== Jordan ===
Mansaf is a traditional Jordanian dish often served during weddings and other celebrations; it is usually made with tender pieces of lamb or goat meat cooked with spices, served on top of a bed of rice, and topped with a yogurt sauce, but goose meat is sometimes used as.

=== Turkey ===
Roasted goose is a commonly eaten main dish in parts of Turkey. The Kars region of Turkey specializes in Kars-style roast goose, or Kars kazı ve bulgur pilavı (Kars goose with bulgur pilaf). The Kars goose is also a breed of goose raised in the area specifically for use in this dish. The goose is baked at extremely high temperature in a tandoori-style oven above a dish of bulgur onto which the rendering fat drips.

== Gallery ==
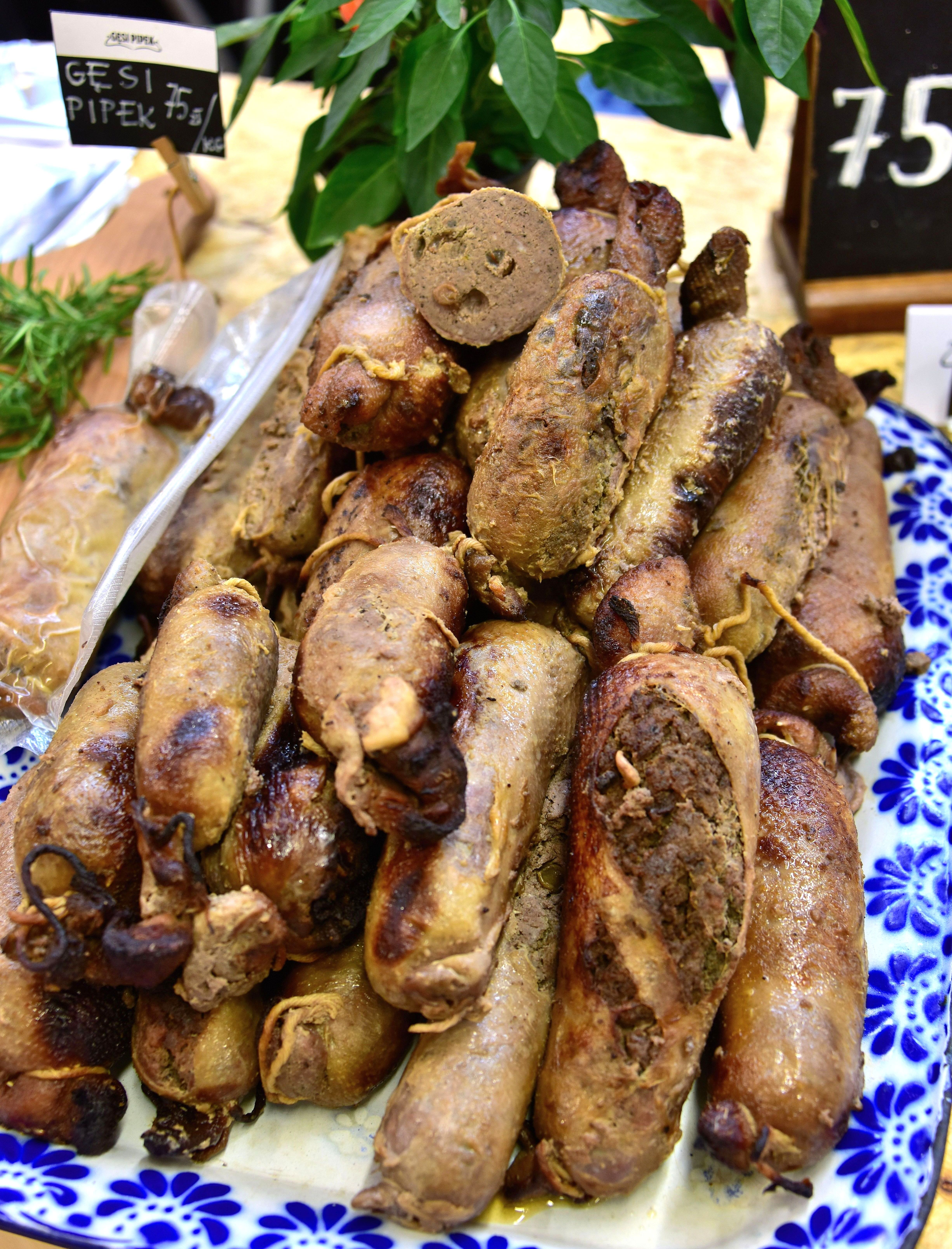
Gęsie pipki (goose necks stuffed with meat)

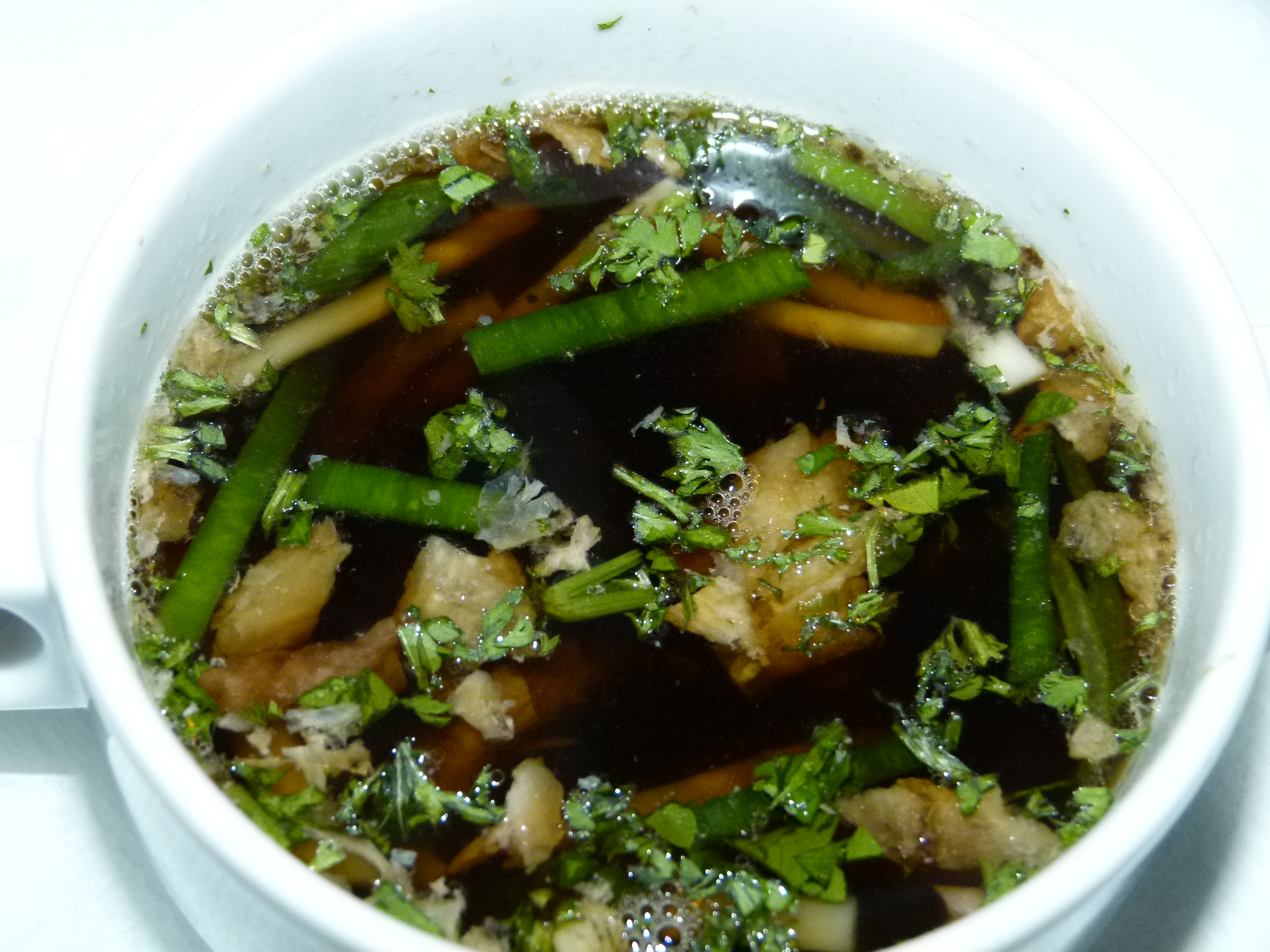
Goose soup with root vegetables

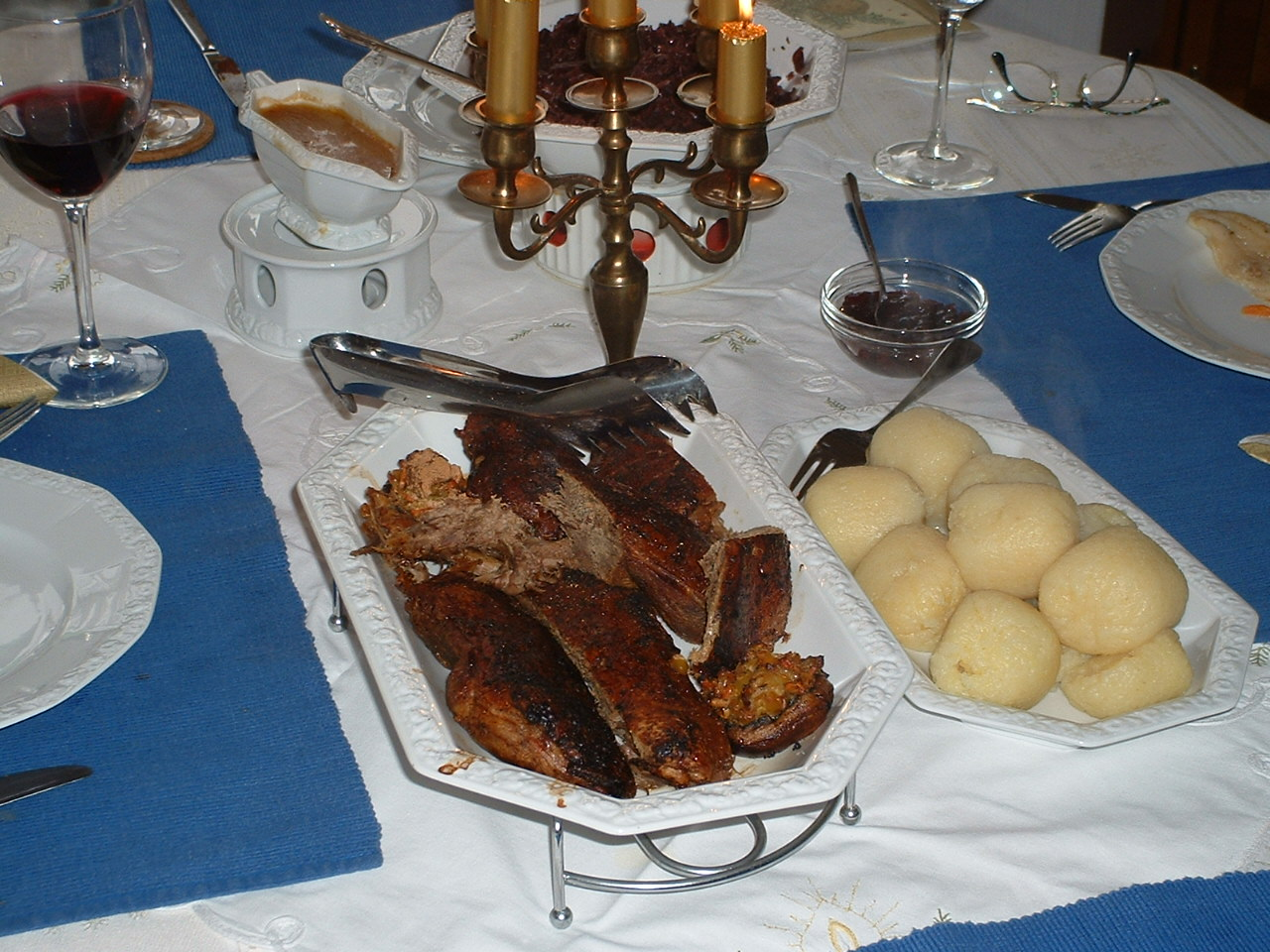
Roast goose with Klöße (dumplings) and red cabbage

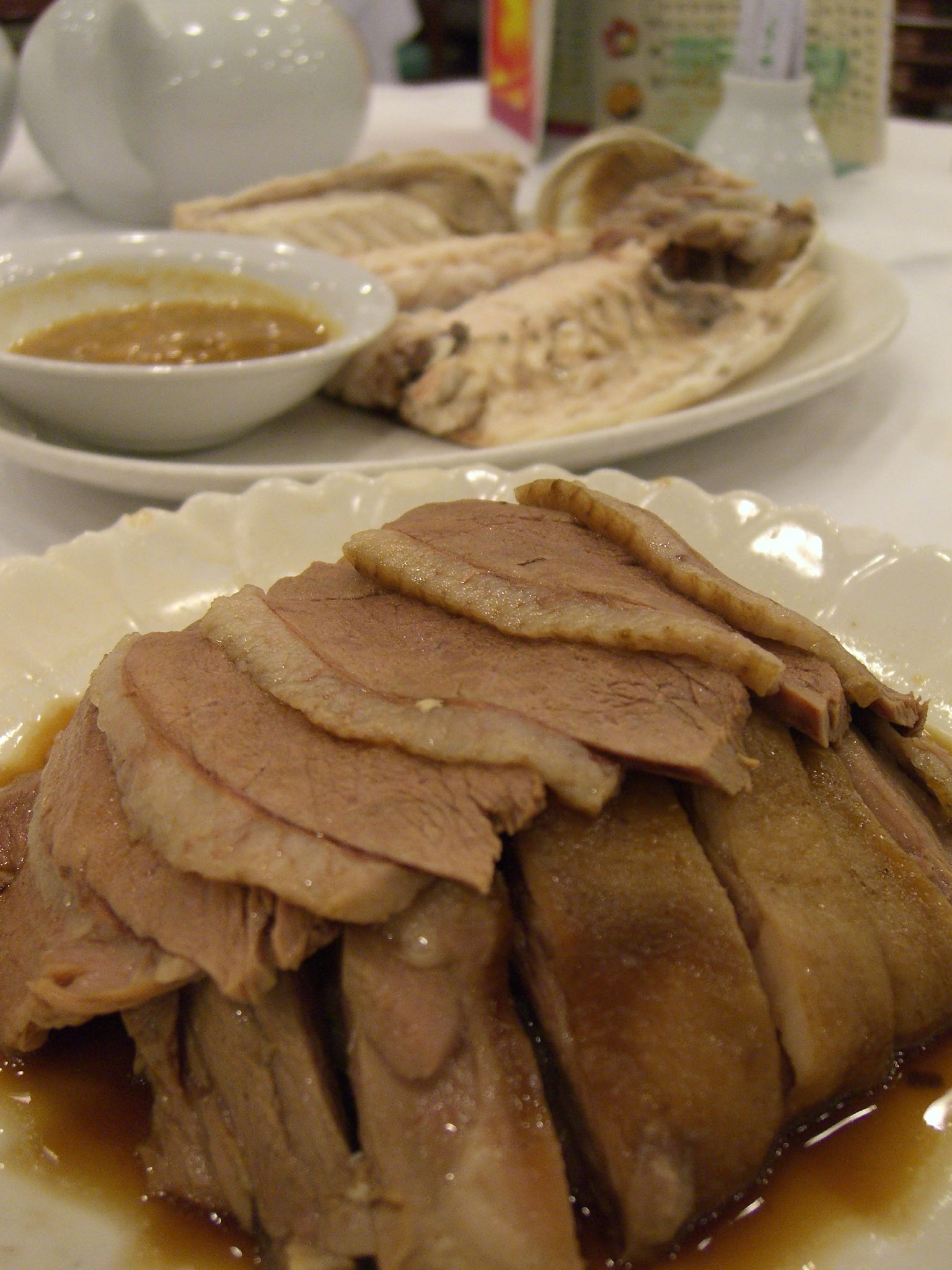
Braised goose

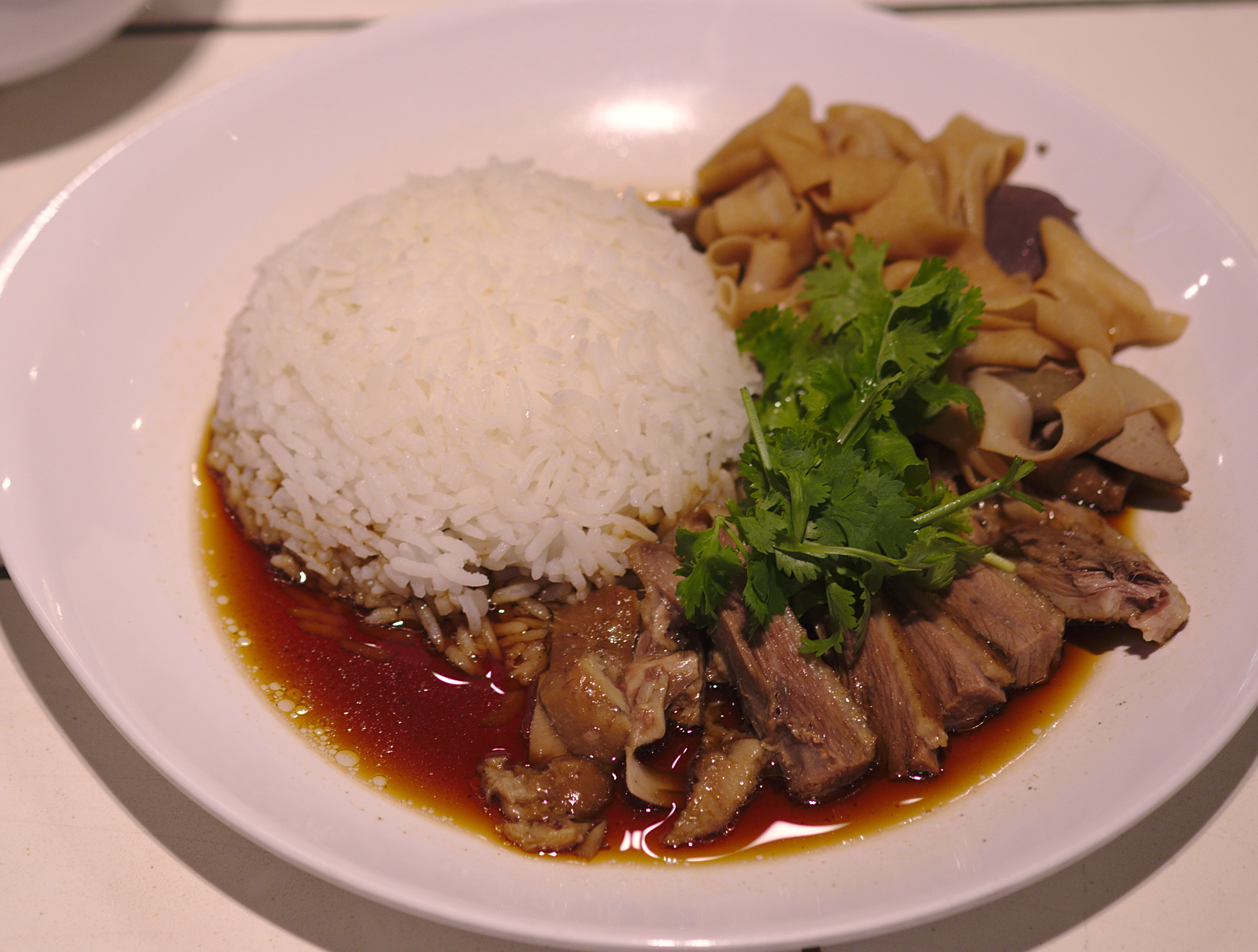
Roast Goose Curry served with rice at a restaurant in Thailand

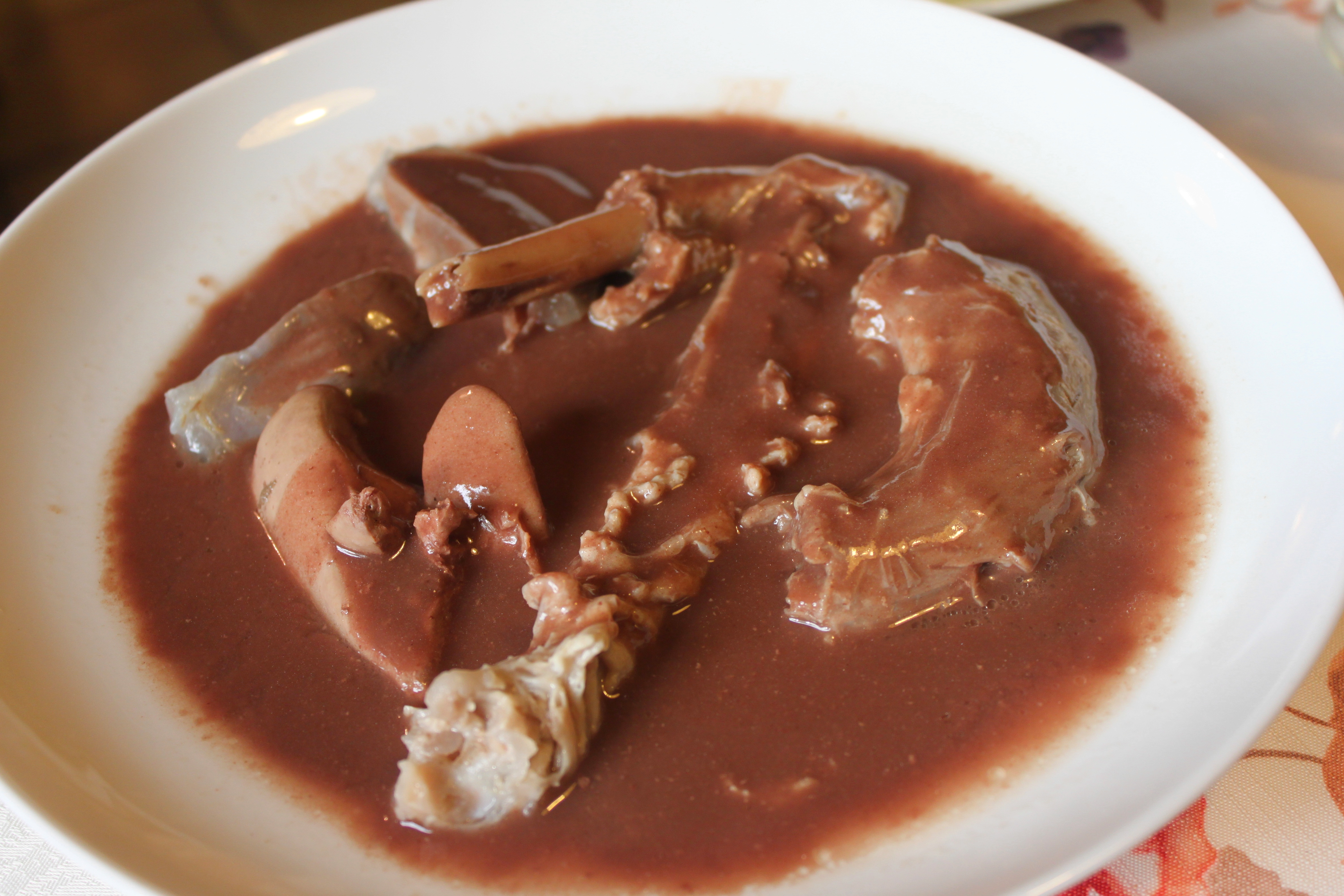
Goose in blood sauce at a restaurant in Willmersreuth

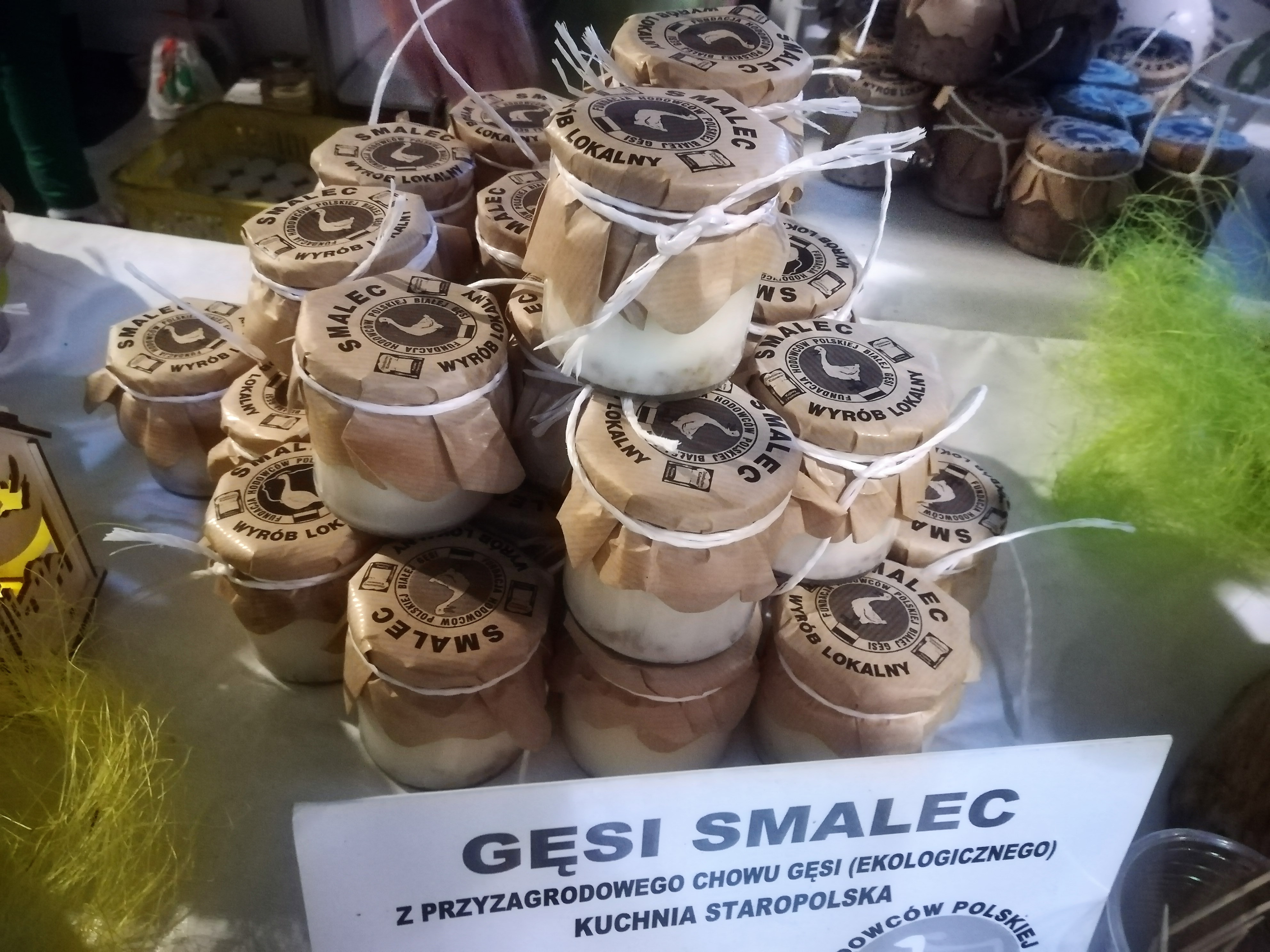
Jars of goose lard

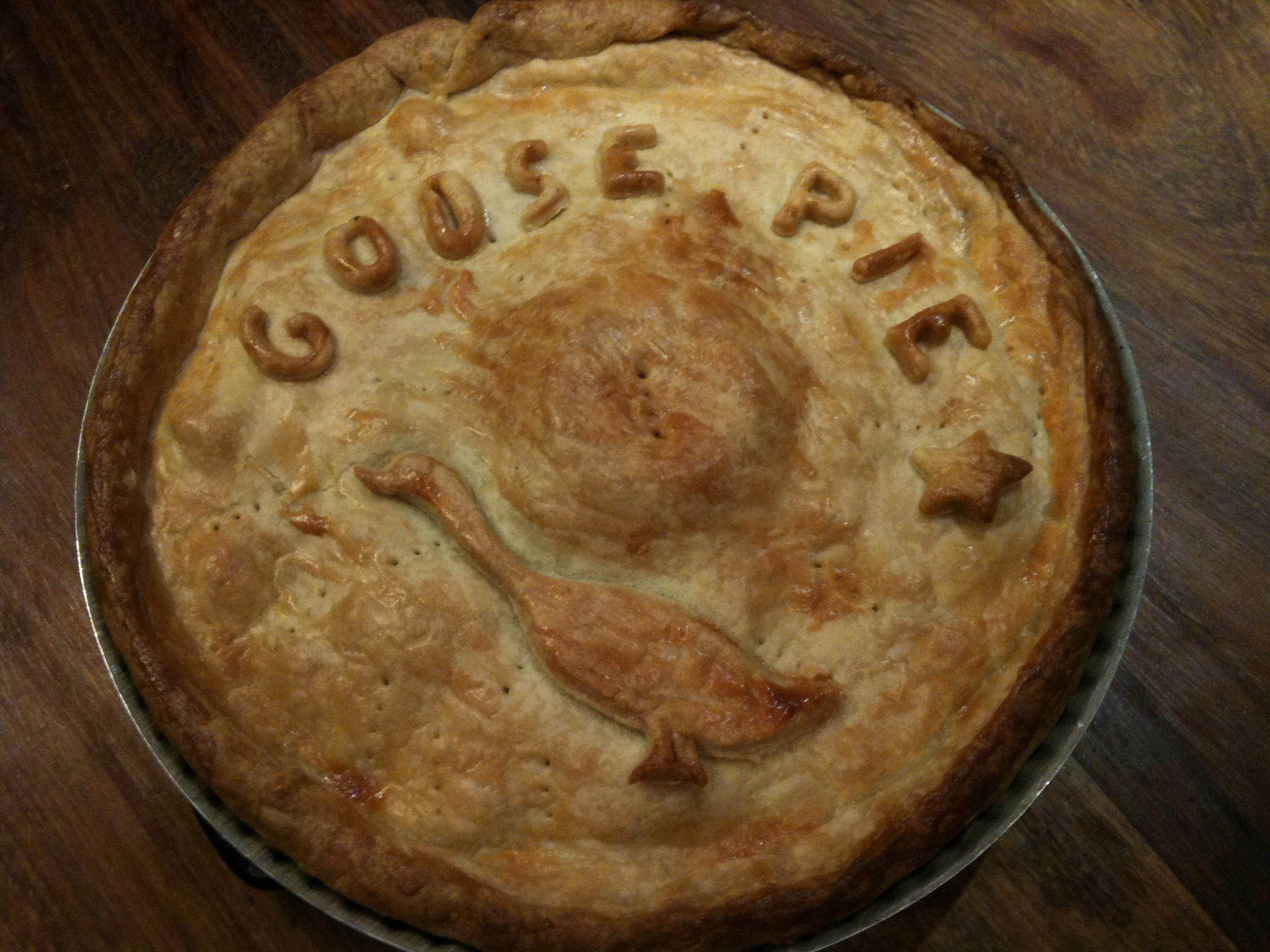
Pie made with leftover goose meat from a roast goose

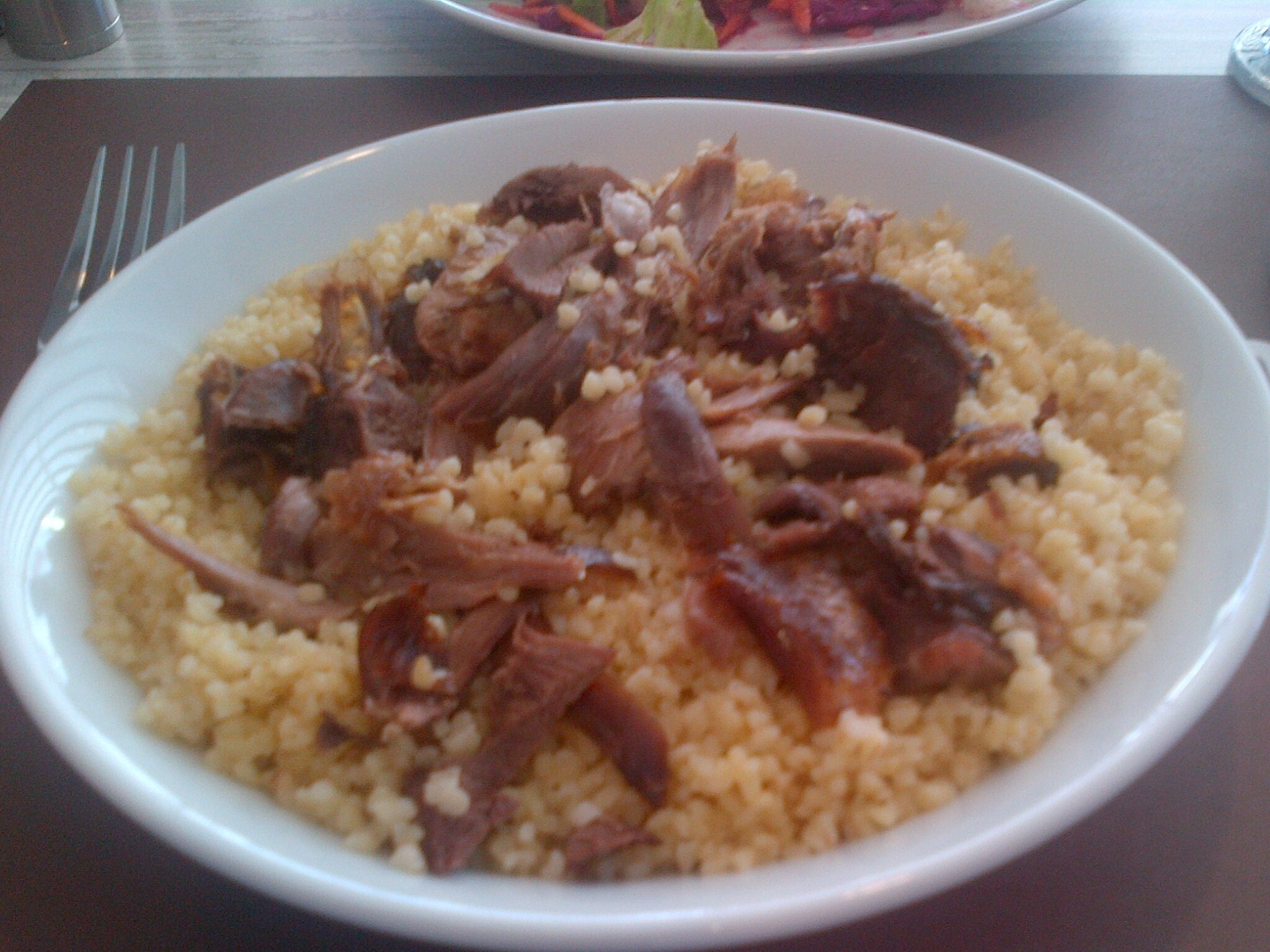
Kaz tiridi, a Turkish specialty of goose meat served over bulgur

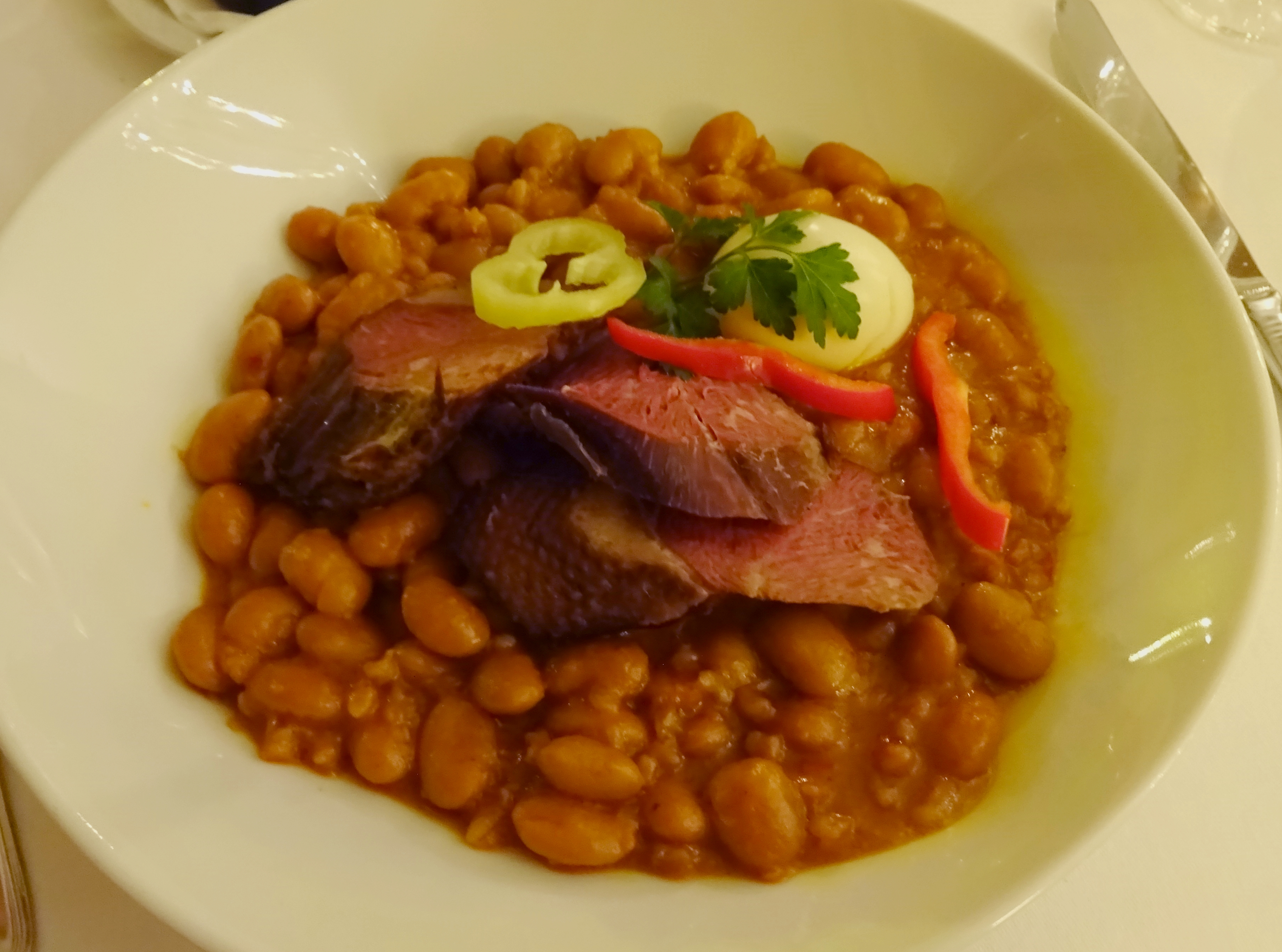
Cholent, a stew of beans topped with smoked goose

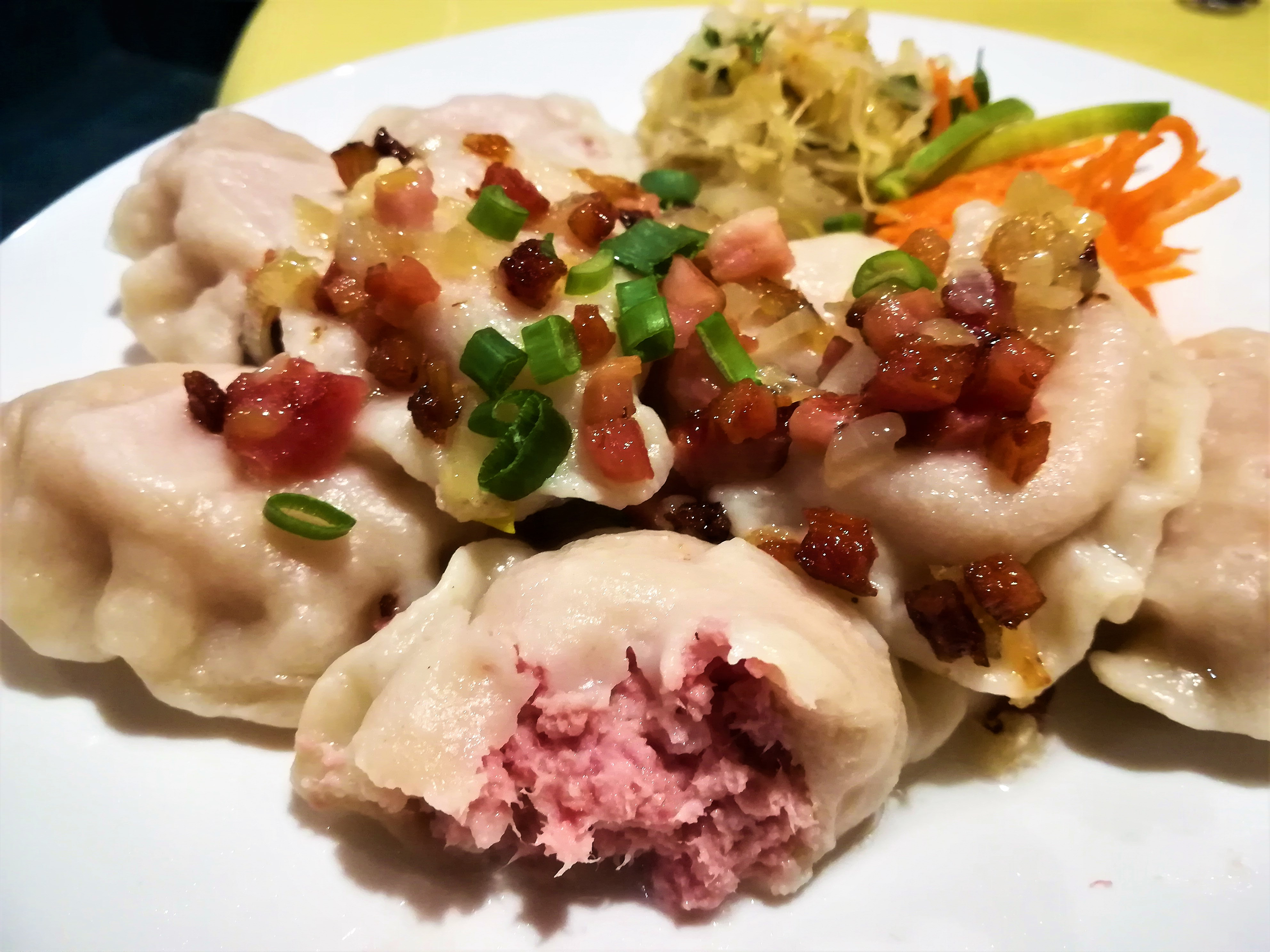
Goose pierogi

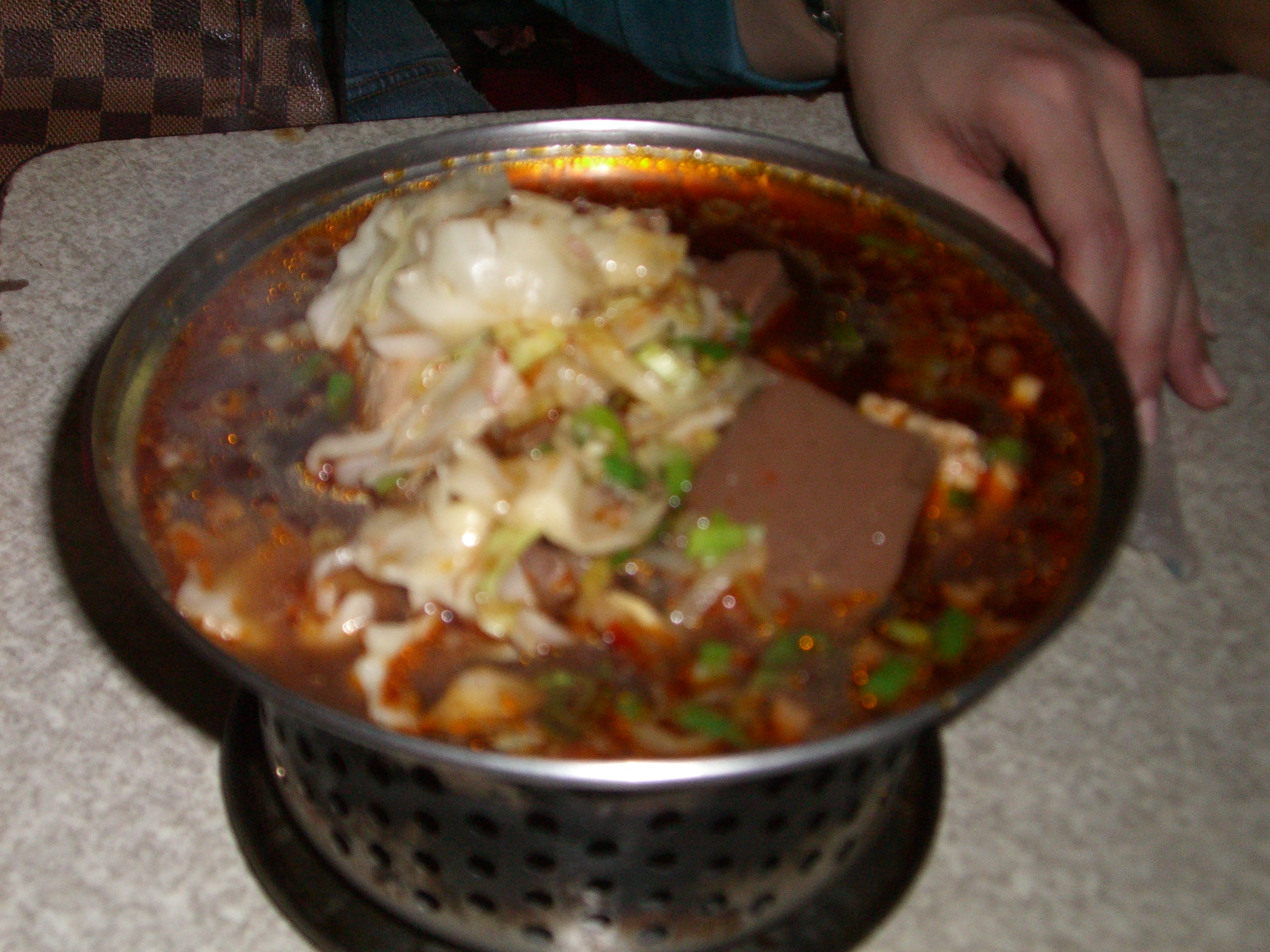
Stinky tofu with goose blood

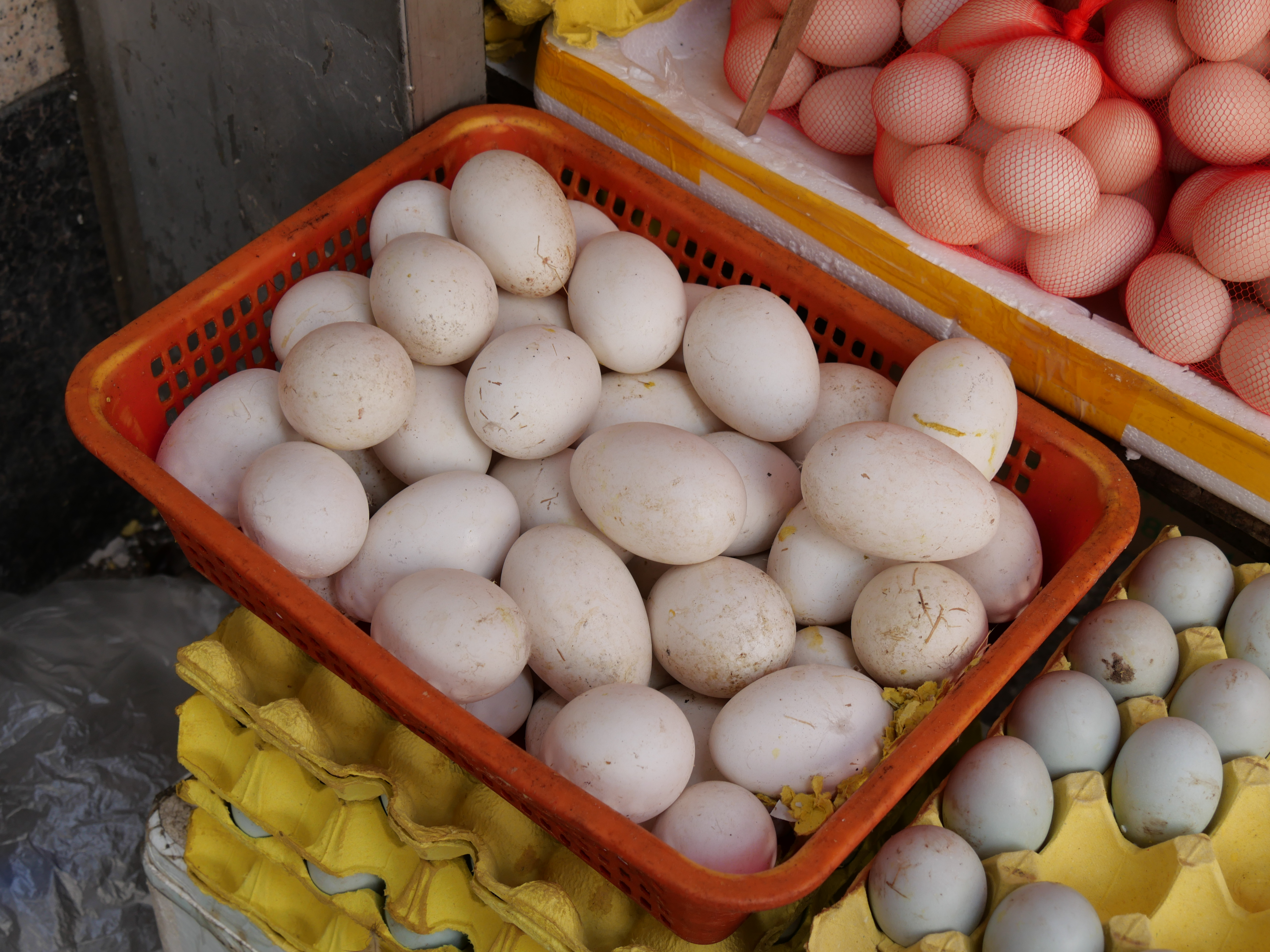
Goose eggs

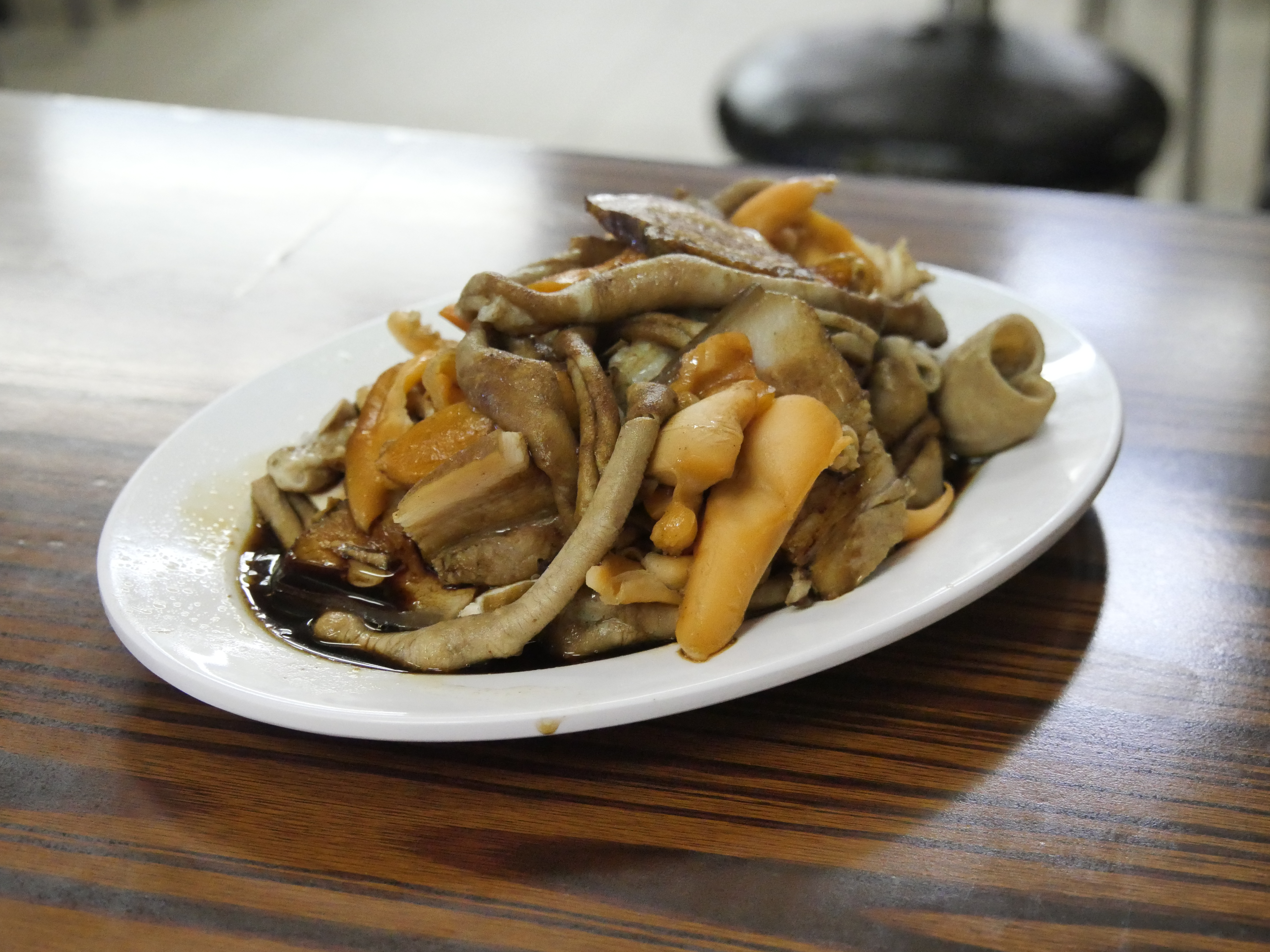
Pork belly with octopus and goose intestines

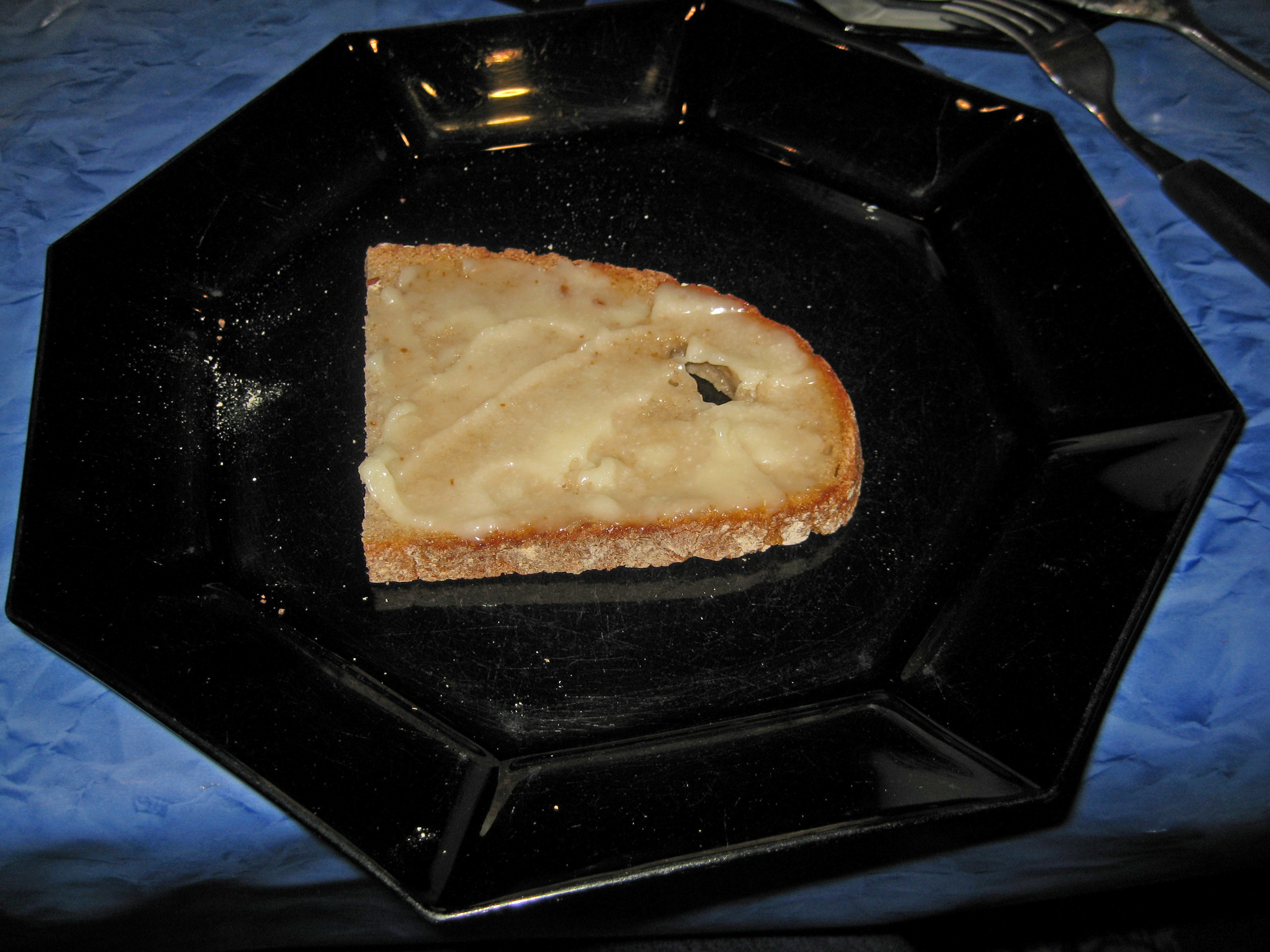
Goose fat as a spread on rye bread

== See also ==
- List of Christmas dishes
- List of goose breeds

== Sources ==
- Beeton, Isabella (1982) [1861]. Mrs Beeton's Book of Household Management. London: Chancellor Press. OCLC 1156425785.
- Bickel, Walter (1989). Hering's Dictionary of Classical and Modern Cookery (eleventh ed.). London: Virtue. ISBN 978-3-8057-0307-9.
- Courtine, Robert (1984). Larousse gastronomique. Paris: Larousse. OCLC 251831003.
- David, Elizabeth (1964). French Provincial Cooking. London: Penguin. OCLC 27037523.
- Davidson, Alan (1999). The Oxford Companion to Food. Oxford: Oxford University Press. ISBN 978-0-19-211579-9.
- Escoffier, Auguste (1934). Ma Cuisine (in French). Paris: Flammarion. OCLC 981486233.
- Glasse, Hannah (1751). The Art of Cookery, Made Plain and Easy (fourth ed.). London: Hannah Glasse. OCLC 1422483872.
- Heberle, Marianna Olszewska (1996). German Cooking. New York: H P Books. ISBN 1557882517.
- Howe, Robin (1983). German Cooking. London: André Deutsch. ISBN 0233975837.
- Luard, Elisabeth (2007). The Food of Spain and Portugal: A Regional Celebration. London: Kyle Books. ISBN 9781904920632.
- Ortiz, Elisabeth Lambert (1989). The Food of Spain & Portugal. Oxford: Lennard. ISBN 1852910372.
- Pedersen, Ruth (1960). Danish Food Cook Book. Solvang: Pedersen Bell. OCLC 16674119.
- Periquet, Jean-Claude (1992). Les Poules, oies et canards (in French). Paris: Editions Rustica. ISBN 9782840380016.
- Perrier-Robert, Annie (1998). L'oie et le canard gourmands (in French). Castelnau-la-Chapelle: L'Hydre. ISBN 2950852467.
- Renfrew, Jane (1993). "Roman Britain". A Taste of History: 10,000 Years of Food in Britain. London: British Museum Press. ISBN 0-7141-1788-9.
- Riley, Gillian (2009). The Oxford Companion to Italian Food. Oxford: Oxford University Press. ISBN 978-0-19-538710-0.
- Widenfelt, Sam, ed. (1965). Swedish Food. Gothenburg: Wezata Forlag. OCLC 1354827644.
