= Ballotine =

Preparation of poultry leg meat

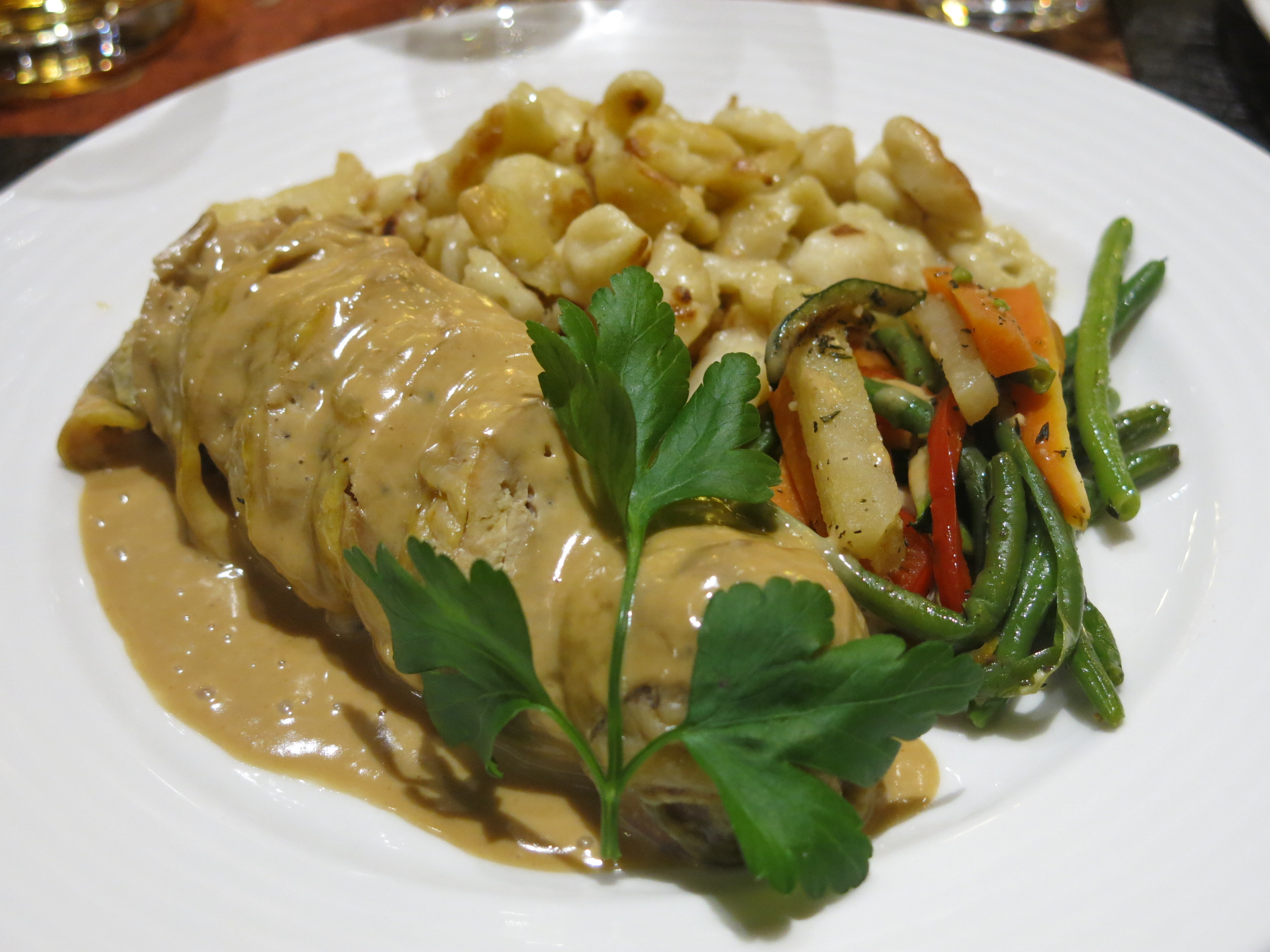
Poultry ballotine

A ballotine (from French balle, 'package') is traditionally a de-boned thigh and/or leg part of the chicken, duck or other poultry stuffed with forcemeat and other ingredients. It is tied to hold its shape and sometimes stitched up with a trussing needle. A ballotine is cooked by roasting, braising or poaching. A ballotine is often shaped like a sausage or re-formed to look like the leg, often with a cleaned piece of bone left in the end.

In today's commercial kitchens a ballotine is often made from other parts of poultry like the leg meat, and may be made using many types of meat other than poultry. Although ballotines are related to galantines, they are distinctive by being single-serving items classified as entrées as opposed to relevés. They are also served hot or cold, whereas a galantine will be served cold.

== See also ==
- Turducken
- List of duck dishes
- List of stuffed dishes
