= Engastration =

Cooking technique

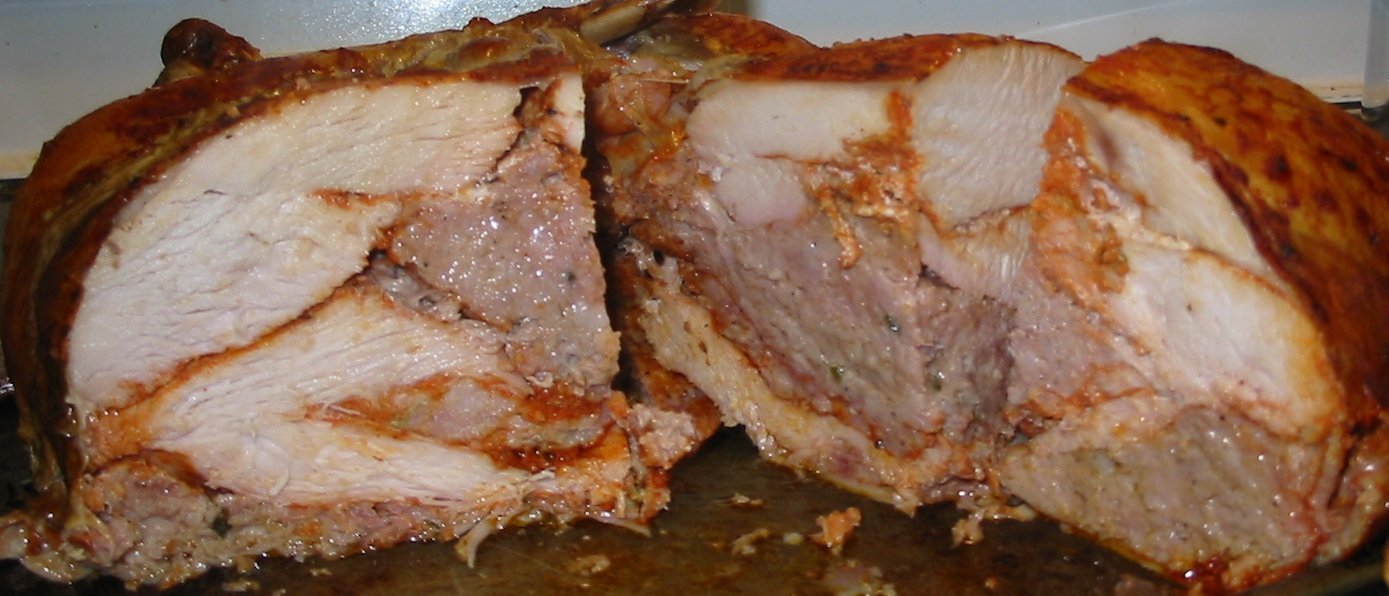
The interior of a sausage-stuffed Turducken

Engastration is a cooking technique in which the remains of one animal are stuffed into another animal. The method supposedly originated during the Middle Ages. Among the dishes made using the method is turducken, which involves placing chicken meat within a duck carcass within a turkey. Some foods created using engastration have stuffing between each layer. The carcasses are normally deboned before being placed together.

== See also ==
- Whole stuffed camel
- Yorkshire Christmas pie
