= Whole stuffed camel =

Fictional dish

A whole stuffed camel or Camalambakicken is a satirical folklore dish consisting of a camel, which is engastrated with a sheep or a lamb, then stuffed with other ingredients.

Reference to this recipe is made in the comedic novel I Served the King of England, first published in 1971 by Czech author Bohumil Hrabal as a traditional Ethiopian dish cooked for a visit to Prague by the Emperor Haile Selassie. The novel Water Music by T. Coraghessan Boyle contains a recipe for camel stuffed with dates, plover eggs, carp, seasoned bustards, and sheep, baked for two days on hot coals in a trench.

Remastered CD versions of the Pink Floyd album Atom Heart Mother contain a card of "Breakfast Tips". On one side is a recipe for a "Traditional Bedouin Wedding Feast", detailing the stuffing of a chicken inside of a lamb, which is stuffed inside a goat, which is then stuffed inside a camel, and cooked over a charcoal fire.

== See also ==
- List of stuffed dishes
- Turducken
