= Bigos =

Polish dish of meat and sauerkraut

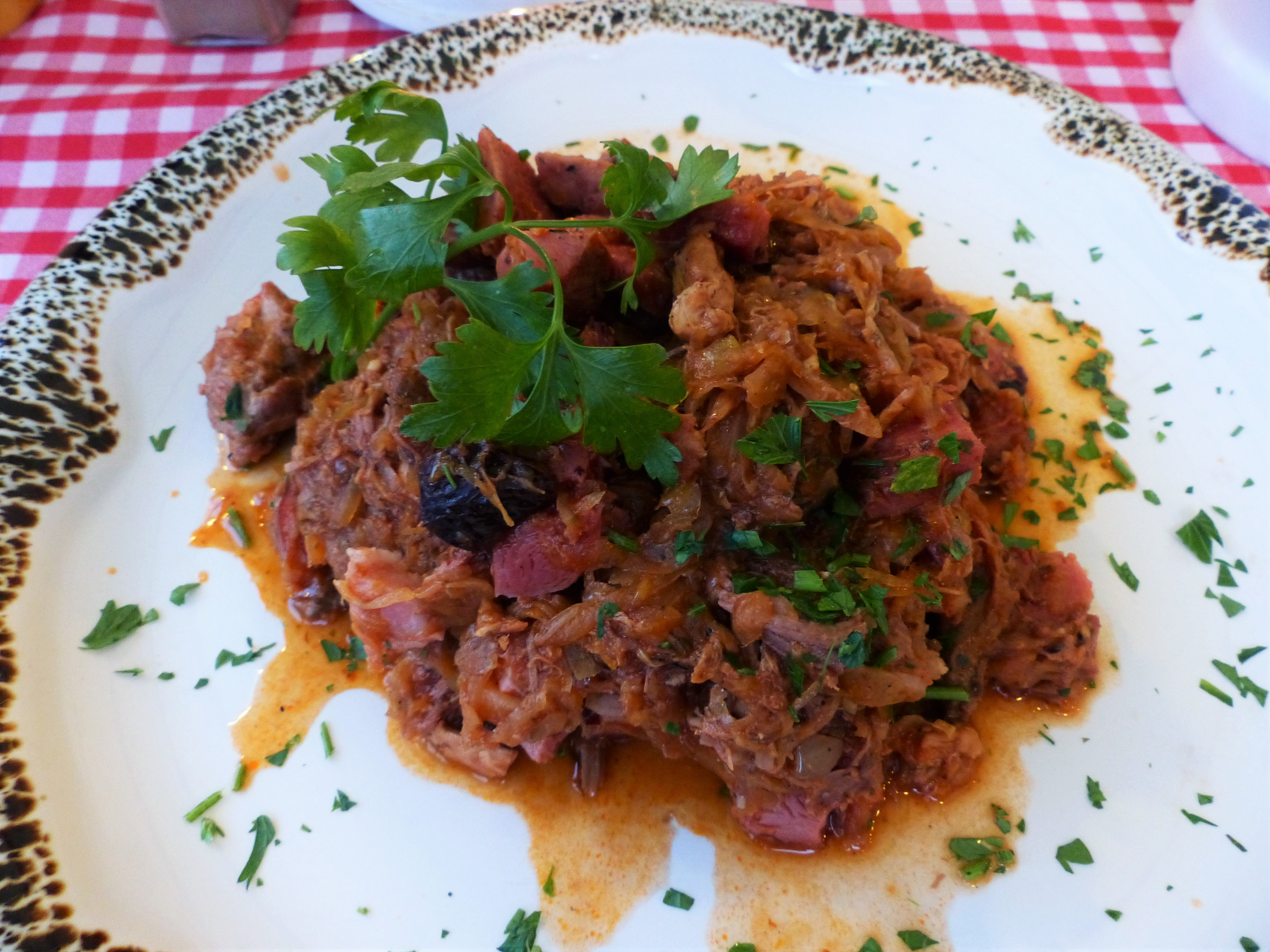
- A plate of bigos
- Type: Stew
- Course: Hot starter or main dish
- Place of origin: Poland
- Region or state: Central Europe and Eastern Europe
- Associated cuisine: Polish
- Serving temperature: Hot
- Main ingredients: Various meats, sauerkraut, cabbage

Bigos (Polish pronunciation: [ˈbʲiɡɔs]), (Note: Ukrainian: бігус; Belarusian: бігас, bihas, or бігус, bihus, Lithuanian: bigusas) or hunter's stew, is a Polish stew of chopped meat of various kinds stewed with sauerkraut, shredded fresh cabbage and spices. It is served hot and can be enriched with additional vegetables and wine. Originally from Poland, the dish also became traditional in the areas of the vast Polish–Lithuanian Commonwealth.

== Etymology ==
The Polish word bigos is probably of Italian or German origin, but its exact etymology is disputed. According to the Polish loanword dictionary edited by Elżbieta Sobol, it may derive from German begossen, meaning "doused" or "basted". Jerzy Bralczyk similarly derives the word from archaic German Beiguss, "sauce". Aleksander Brückner has proposed the German Bleiguss, "piece of lead", as a possible source, referring to a tradition of divining from strangely shaped flakes of molten lead dropped into water. Maria Dembińska rejects this etymology as "doubtlessly erroneous", suggesting instead either archaic German becken, "to chop", or old German bîbôz (Beifuss in modern German), meaning "mugwort" (Artemisia vulgaris), a herb that was popular in medieval cuisine. Andrzej Bańkowski also points to the Italian bigutta, or "pot for cooking soup", as a possible derivation via German.

== Ingredients and preparation ==
The principal ingredients of bigos are assorted kinds of meat chopped into bite-sized chunks and a mixture of sauerkraut and shredded fresh white cabbage. The meats may include pork (such as ham, shoulder, bacon, ribs, and loin), beef and veal, poultry (chicken, duck, goose, turkey) and game, as well as charcuterie, especially various kinds of kiełbasa. The variety of meats is considered essential for good bigos; its preparation may be a good occasion to clean out one's freezer and use up leftovers from other meat dishes. Some of the meats may be roasted before being diced together with other cuts of meat and braised in lard or vegetable oil.

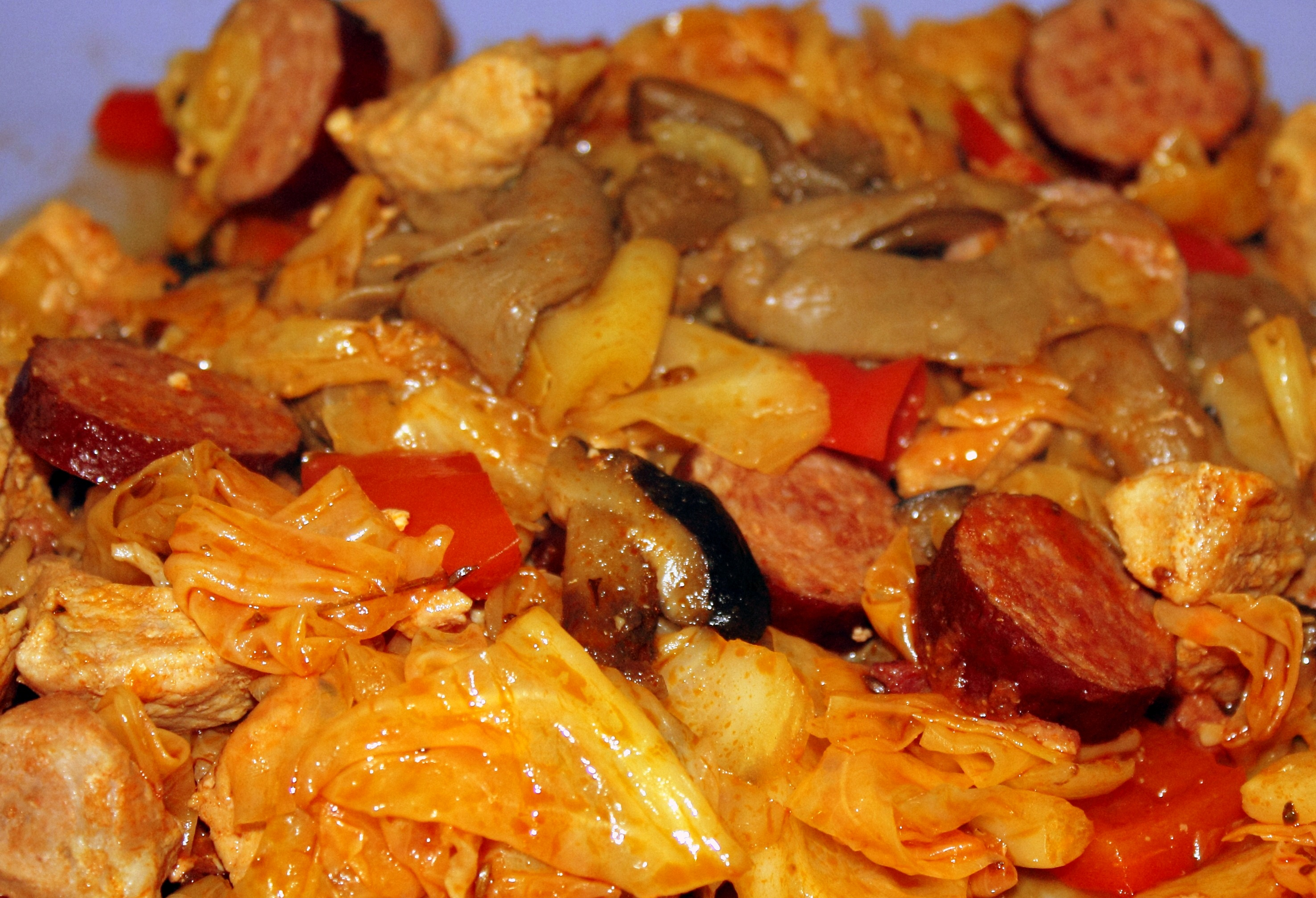
Closeup of bigos

The sauerkraut is often rinsed and drained before being chopped and mixed with shredded fresh cabbage. The proportion depends on the sauerkraut's maturity; the longer it has cured, the more sour it tastes, calling for more fresh cabbage to balance the flavor. Traditionally, cabbage was pickled into sauerkraut in fall, so bigos made at that time could be made with only half-cured sauerkraut, but by early spring, the sauerkraut had to be combined in equal parts with fresh cabbage. The mixture is precooked in a small amount of water before being mixed with the braised meat and left to simmer for several hours. Ideally, the stew should thicken through evaporation alone, but flour, roux, crumbled rye bread or a grated raw potato may be added to it to take up excess moisture.

Other ingredients often added to bigos include onions, diced and browned in lard together with the meat, and dried forest mushrooms that are precooked separately in boiling water. The stew is usually seasoned with salt, black peppercorns, allspice, juniper berries and bay leaves. Some recipes also call for caraway, cloves, garlic, marjoram, mustard seeds, nutmeg, paprika and thyme. The tart flavor of sauerkraut may be enhanced by adding some dry red wine or beet sour (fermented beetroot juice that is also a traditional ingredient of borscht), which may impart a reddish hue to the stew. Bigos is often slightly sweetened with sugar, honey, raisins, prunes or plum butter known in Polish as powidła.

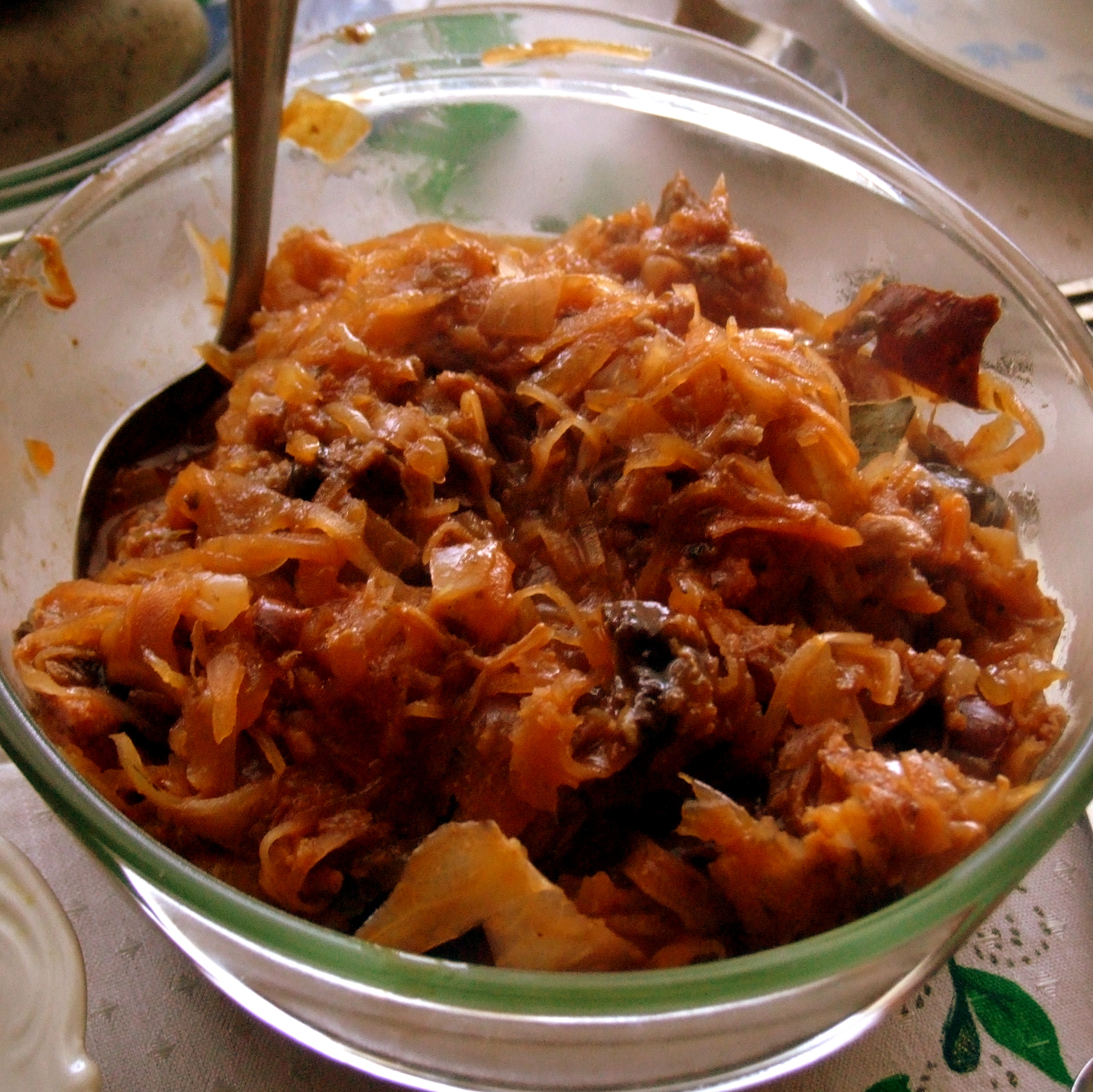
A bowl of bigos

Traditionally, bigos is stewed in a cauldron over an open fire or in a large pot on a stove, but it may also be prepared in an electric slow cooker. The contents should be stirred from time to time, to prevent scorching, which may impart a bitter taste to the entire batch. Bigos is considered best after it has been repeatedly refrigerated and reheated to allow the flavors to fuse.

== Varieties ==
The flexible and forgiving recipe for bigos allows a great number of variants, often simply using what ingredients are at hand. It is often claimed that there are as many recipes as there are cooks in Poland.

In the region of Greater Poland, bigos typically contains tomato paste and is seasoned with garlic and marjoram. Kuyavian bigos is often made from red cabbage as well as white. In Silesia, it is usually mixed with kopytka or kluski, that is, small plain boiled dumplings made from unleavened dough that contains flour and mashed potatoes. A variant that contains julienned apples, preferably with a winey tart taste, such as Antonovka, is known as Lithuanian bigos and is typical for the territory of the erstwhile Grand Duchy of Lithuania (now Belarus, Lithuania and Ukraine).

In bigos myśliwski, or "hunter's bigos", at least part of the meat comes from game, such as wild boar, venison or hare. It is usually seasoned with juniper berries, which help neutralize off-flavors that may be found in the meat of wild animals.

== Serving ==
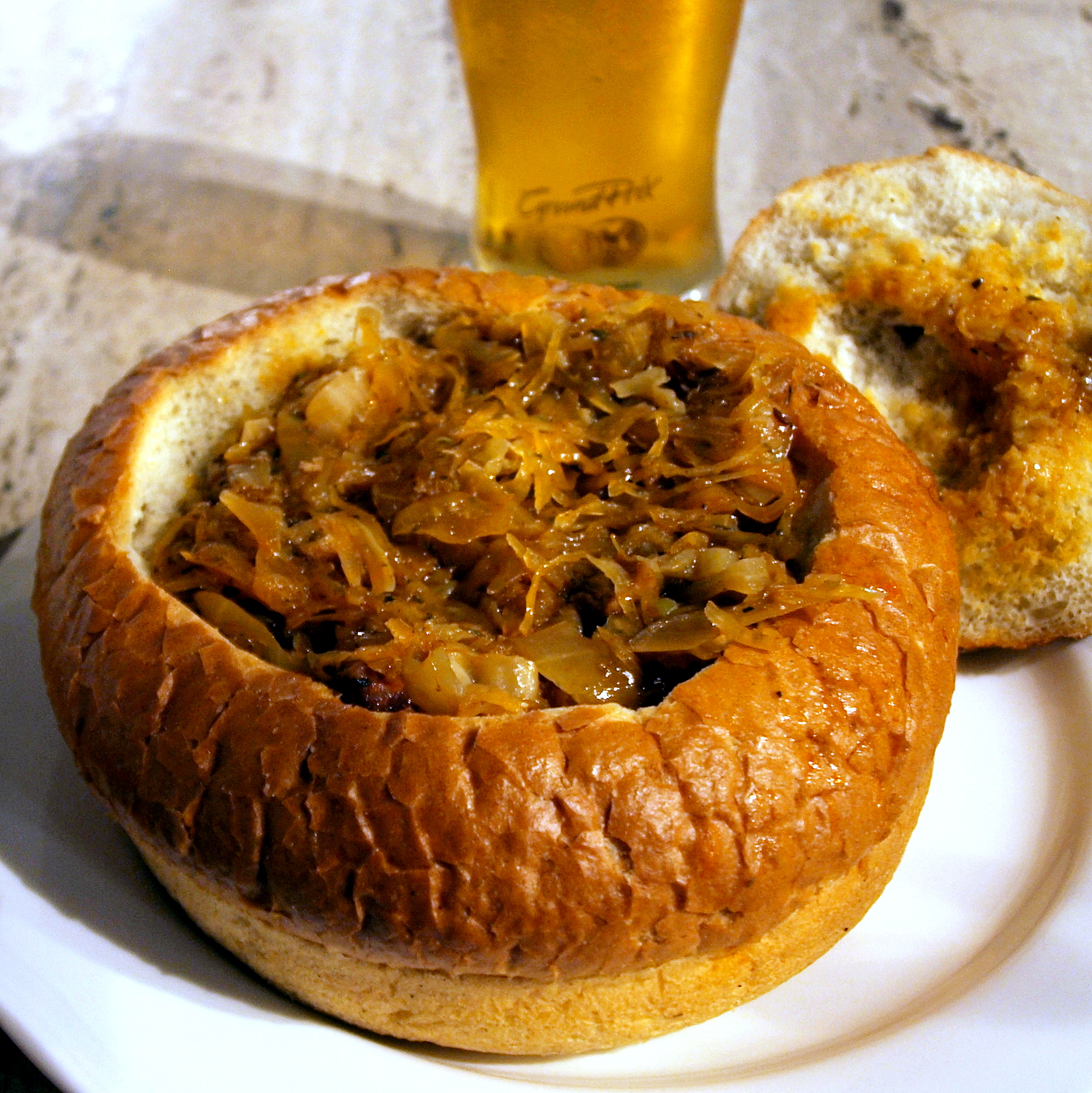
Bigos served in a bread bowl with beer

As a dish that does not spoil quickly and is thought to improve with each reheating, bigos has been traditionally used as a provision for travellers and campers, or consumed at outdoor events, such as a hunt or a carnival sleigh ride known in Polish as kulig. It may also be eaten indoors for breakfast or supper, or as a hot starter served before soup at a dinner party. It is commonly found on the menus of milk bars, pubs and bistros throughout Poland. Bigos is particularly associated with major Catholic holidays, such as Christmas and Easter, as it can be prepared in ample quantities beforehand and only reheated on the holiday itself and the following days. Bigos can be stored for a long time and is often frozen for later consumption, which actually enhances its flavor.

The stew is typically dished up with rye bread or boiled potatoes. In a fancier setting, it may be served in stoneware bowls, puff pastry shells or bread bowls. Bigos, especially when enjoyed outdoors, is traditionally paired with shots of chilled vodka, either clear or flavored. Varieties of flavored vodka that match well with bigos include żubrówka (bison grass), jałowcówka (juniper), piołunówka (wormwood), Goldwasser (various herbs) and starka (oak-aged). If served at home or in a restaurant, the stew may be paired with beer, red wine or Riesling.

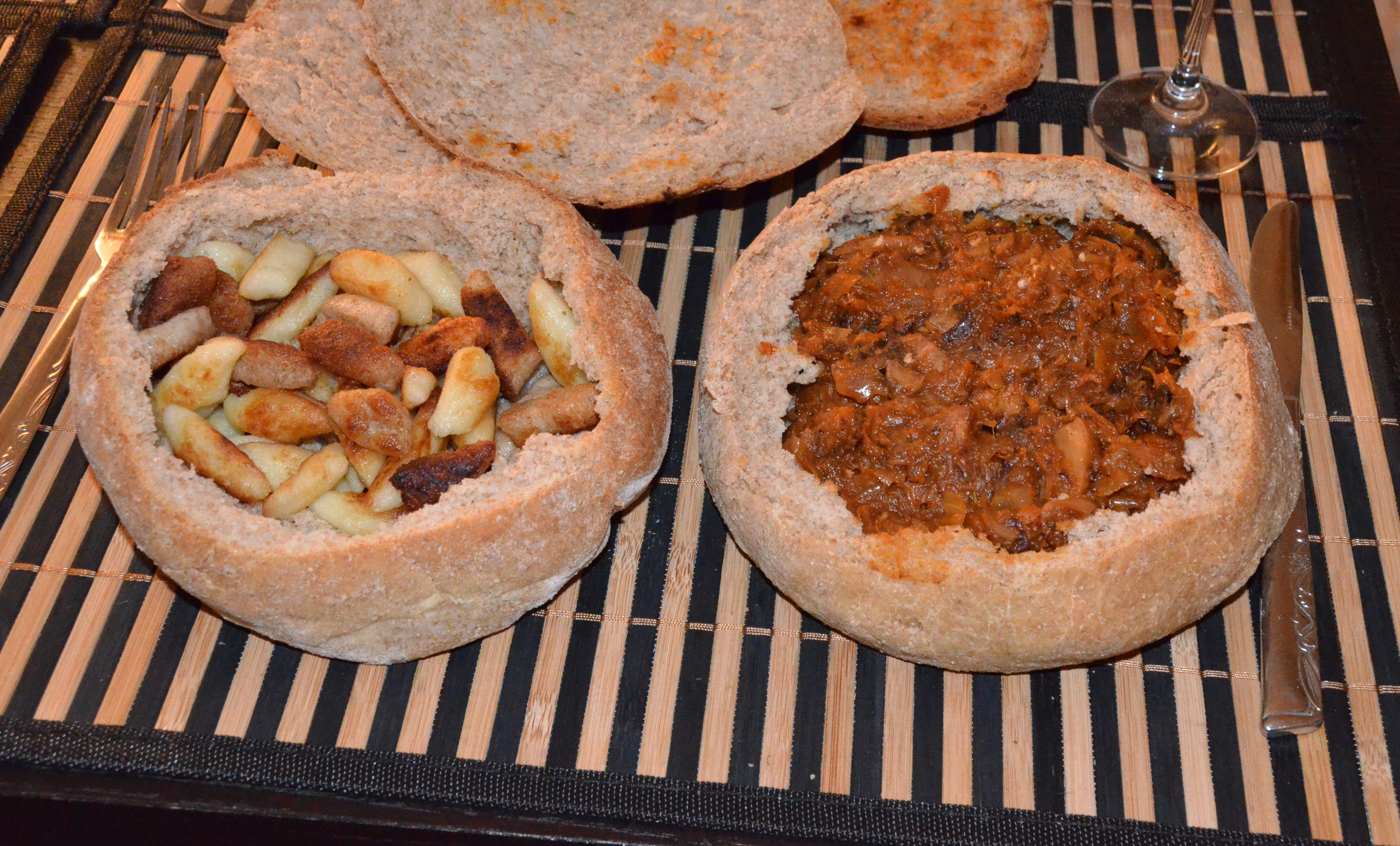
Traditional Polish Bigos with Kopytka as a side dish

== History ==
According to Polish food historian Maria Dembińska, bigos may derive from a medieval dish known in Latin as compositum, or "mixture". It was made from various vegetables, such as cabbage, chard and onions, that were chopped or shredded, layered inside an earthenware three-legged Dutch oven and braised or baked. A remnant of this old procedure may be found in a bigos recipe, in which bacon and cabbage are arranged in layers, from the 19th-century Russian cookbook A Gift to Young Housewives by Elena Molokhovets. It is believed this dish was introduced in the region by Sephardic Jews coming from the Portuguese region of Alentejo, replacing ingredients with regional produce. Similar layered dishes of medieval origin also exist in other European cuisines; they include the Italian mescolanza (known in 16th-century Poland under the Polonized name miszkulancja) and the Alsatian Baeckeoffe (also known as potée boulangère), made from cabbage, leftover meats and fruits. They are reminiscent of a rustic Polish casserole, known in various regions as pieczonka, prażonki, duszonki, maścipula, and other names. It is traditionally made from sliced or diced potatoes, onions, carrots, sausages and bacon arranged in layers inside a cast-iron cauldron greased with lard and lined with cabbage leaves, which is placed in bonfire embers for baking.

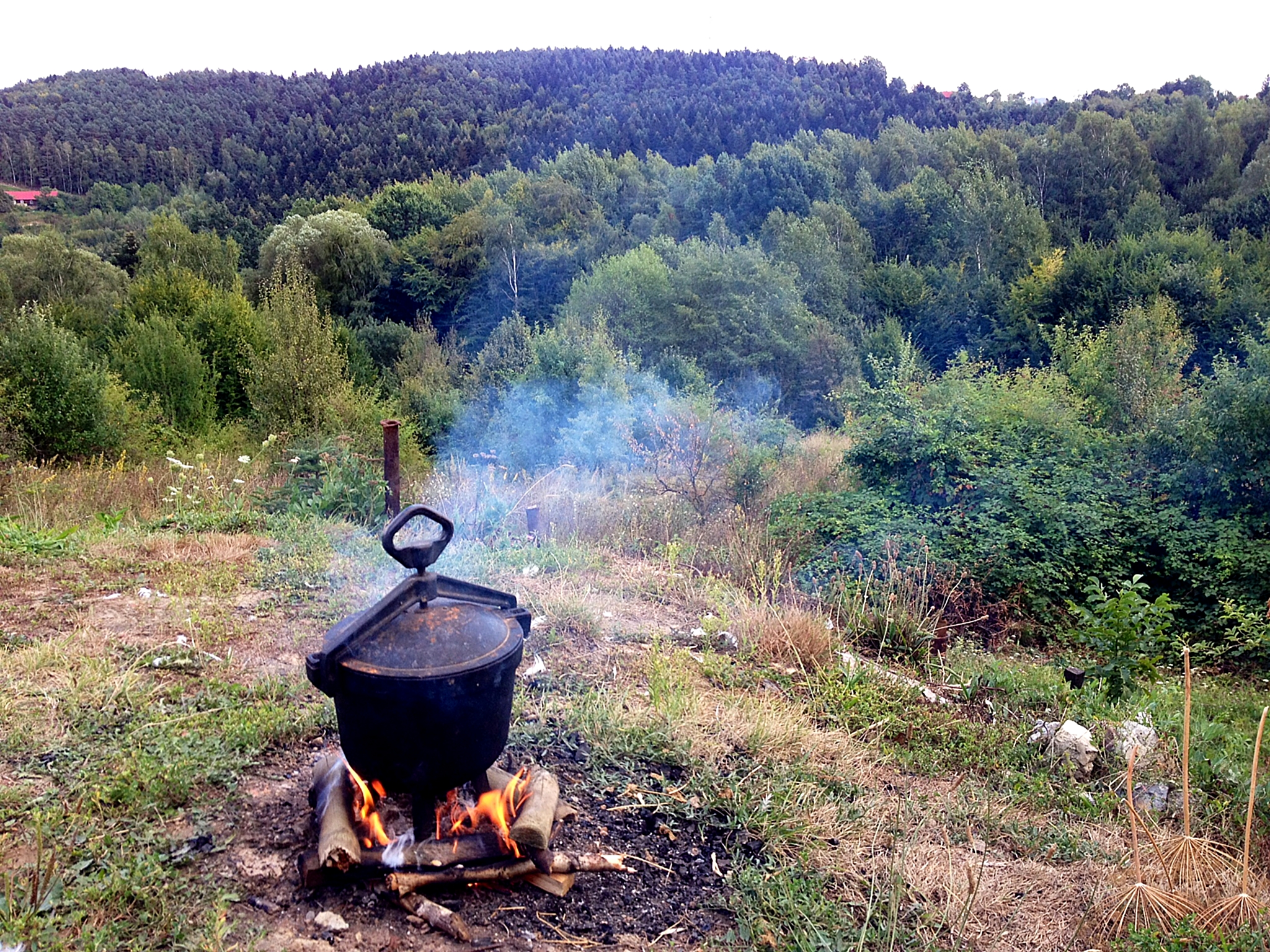
Pieczonka baked in a cast-iron pot over a campfire

The word "bigos" is not attested before the 17th century. At that time, it referred to any dish of finely chopped components, usually meat or fish – but no cabbage – doused generously with melted butter and heavily seasoned with sour, sweet and spicy ingredients. Stanisław Czerniecki, head chef to Prince Aleksander Michał Lubomirski, who consistently used the diminutive form bigosek, included several recipes for it in his Compendium ferculorum (A Collection of Dishes), the oldest surviving cookbook printed and published in Polish, in 1682 (however, around 2019 another old cookbook was found that included recipes from an earlier, i.e. 16th-century, now-lost Polish cookbook). They include bigosek prepared with chopped capon, hazel grouse, carp, pike, and crawfish with beef marrow. Seasonings that appear in most of these recipes include onions, wine vinegar, lemon or lime juice, verjuice, sorrel, sugar, raisins, black pepper, cinnamon, nutmeg, cloves and cumin. A manuscript recipe collection from the Radziwiłł family court, dating back to ca. 1686, contains instructions for cooking bigos of roast beef, fried fish and even chopped crêpes (thin pancakes). Kucharz doskonały (The Perfect Cook), a cookbook published by Wojciech Wielądko in 1783, contains recipes for beef, veal, wether mutton, oyster, as well as root vegetable bigos (the latter was a mixture of carrots, parsnip, rutabaga and celeriac).

Bigos made entirely of meat and exotic spices was affordable only to the affluent Polish nobility. The 18th century saw the development of a poor man's version of the dish, known as bigos hultajski, or "rascal's bigos", in which vinegar and lemon juice were replaced with cheaper sauerkraut as the source of tartness. Sauerkraut and cabbage also acted as a filler allowing to reduce the amount of meat in the dish. Rascal's bigos became common during the reign of King Augustus III of Poland (r. 1734–1763). Over the course of the 19th century, its rise in popularity continued as the proportion of meat decreased in favor of sauerkraut, eventually superseding all other kinds of bigos and losing the disparaging epithet in the process.

== In culture ==
In the pots warmed the bigos; mere words cannot tell
Of its wondrous taste, colour and marvellous smell.
One can hear the words buzz, and the rhymes ebb and flow,
But its content no city digestion can know.
To appreciate the Lithuanian folksong and folk food,
You need health, live on land, and be back from the wood.
Without these, still a dish of no mediocre worth
Is bigos, made from legumes, best grown in the earth;
Pickled cabbage comes foremost, and properly chopped,
Which itself, is the saying, will in one's mouth hop;
In the boiler enclosed, with its moist bosom shields
Choicest morsels of meat raised on greenest of fields;
Then it simmers, till fire has extracted each drop
Of live juice, and the liquid boils over the top,
And the heady aroma wafts gently afar.
Now the bigos is ready. With triple hurrah
Charge the huntsmen, spoon-armed, the hot vessel to raid,
Brass thunders and smoke belches, like camphor to fade,
Only in depths of cauldrons, there still writhes there later
Steam, as if from a dormant volcano's deep crater.

— Adam Mickiewicz (translated by Marcel Weyland),
Pan Tadeusz (Book Four, Diplomacy and the Hunt)

Bigos is considered a Polish national dish, which, according to American food historian William Woys Weaver, "has been romanticized in poetry, discussed in its most minute details in all sorts of literary contexts, and never made in small quantities."

The most famous literary monument to bigos can be found in Pan Tadeusz, a mock-heroic poem venerated as the Polish national epic, extolling the country life of Polish noblemen in the Grand Duchy of Lithuania, written by Adam Mickiewicz in 1834. It describes a group of men out in the woods, enjoying the stew of "wondrous taste, colour and marvellous smell" after a successful bear hunt.

== See also ==
- Cabbage stew
- List of cabbage dishes
- Cassoeula, a Lombard stew of Savoy cabbage with pork
- Choucroute garnie, an Alsatian dish of sauerkraut and large chunks of various meats and potatoes
- Kapusta kiszona duszona, braised sauerkraut usually served as a side dish in Polish cuisine
- Podvarak and svadbarski kupus, Serbian dishes of sauerkraut or cabbage stewed with meat
- List of stews

== Sources ==
- Applebaum, Anne; Crittenden, Danielle (2012). From a Polish Country House Kitchen: 90 Recipes for the Ultimate Comfort Food. San Francisco: Chronicle Books. ISBN 978-1-4521-2425-4.
- Bańkowski, Andrzej, ed. (2000). Etymologiczny słownik języka polskiego [Polish etymological dictionary] (in Polish). Vol. 1. Wydawnictwo Naukowe PWN.
- Bralczyk, Jerzy (2014). Jeść!!! [Let me eat!] (in Polish). BOSZ. ISBN 978-83-7576-218-1.
- Brückner, Aleksander, ed. (1927). Słownik etymologiczny języka polskiego [Polish etymological dictionary] (in Polish). Krakowska Spółka Wydawnicza.
- Chwalba, Andrzej, ed. (2008). Obyczaje w Polsce: Od średniowiecza do czasów współczesnych [Customs of Poland: From the Middle Ages to Modern Times] (in Polish). Warszawa: Wydawnictwo Naukowe PWN. ISBN 978-83-01-14253-7.
- Czerniecki, Stanisław (1682). Compendium ferculorum, albo Zebranie potraw [A Collection of Dishes] (in Polish). Kraków: Drukarnia Jerzego i Mikołaja Schedlów.
- Dembińska, Maria (1999). Weaver, William Woys (ed.). Food and Drink in Medieval Poland: Rediscovering a Cuisine of the Past. Philadelphia: University of Pennsylvania Press. ISBN 0-8122-3224-0.
- Dumanowski, Jarosław; Jankowski, Rafał, eds. (2011). Moda bardzo dobra smażenia różnych konfektów [A Very Good Way of Frying Various Confections]. Monumenta Poloniae Culinaria (in Polish). Warszawa: Muzeum Pałac w Wilanowie. ISBN 978-83-60959-18-3.
- Dumanowski, Jarosław (2012). "Bigos oświeconych" [Bigos of the Enlightened]. naTemat.pl.
- Dumanowski, Jarosław (2015). "Polish cuisine, or bigos with cabbage". Silva Rerum. Muzeum Pałacu Króla Jana III w Wilanowie. Archived from the original on 2023-05-30.
- Ermochkine, Nicholas; Iglikowski, Peter (2003). 40 Degrees East: An Anatomy of Vodka. Nova Science Publishers. ISBN 978-1-61470-108-8.
- Gloger, Zygmunt (1900). Encyklopedja Staropolska [Old Polish Encyclopedia] (in Polish). Warszawa: P. Laskauer i W. Babicki.
- Kitowicz, Jędrzej (1840). Opis obyczajów i zwyczajów za panowania Augusta III [Description of customs and habits under Augustus III] (in Polish). Poznań: Edward Raczyński.
- Крапіва, Кандрат, ed. (2003). Беларуска-рускі слоўнік (in Belarusian). Vol. 1. Мінск: Беларуская энцыклапедыя імя Петруся Броўкі. Нацыянальная акадэмія навук Беларусі. Інстытут мовазнаўства імя Якуба Коласа. ISBN 985-11-0271-7.
- Мартынаў, В. У., ed. (1978). Этымалагічны слоўнік беларускай мовы (in Belarusian). Vol. 1. Мінск: Навука і тэхніка.
- Kuroń, Maciej (2004). Kuchnia polska: Kuchnia Rzeczypospolitej wielu narodów [Polish Cuisine: Cuisine of the Commonwealth of Many Nations] (in Polish). Czarna Owca. ISBN 83-89763-25-7.
- Lemnis, Maria; Vitry, Henryk (1979). W staropolskiej kuchni i przy polskim stole [Old Polish Traditions in the Kitchen and at the Table] (in Polish). Warszawa: Interpress.
- "Lista produktów tradycyjnych" [List of traditional products] (in Polish). Ministerstwo Rolnictwa i Rozwoju Wsi. Archived from the original on 2018-05-24.
- Łozińska, Maja; Łoziński, Jan (2013). Historia polskiego smaku: kuchnia, stół, obyczaje [History of the Polish Taste: Kitchen, Table, Customs] (in Polish). Warszawa: Wydawnictwo Naukowe PWN. ISBN 978-83-7705-269-3.
- Mickiewicz, Adam (2006) [1834]. "Pan Tadeusz". Translated by Weyland, Marcel. Archived from the original on 2017-02-09.
- Monaghan, Gail (2011-02-19). "A Royal Ragout". The Wall Street Journal.
- Olszewska Heberle, Marianna (2005) [1991]. Polish Cooking. Penguin. ISBN 1-55788-477-3.
- Pokhlebkin, William Vasilyevich (2004) [1978]. Natsionalnye kukhni nashikh narodov (Национальные кухни наших народов) [National Cuisines of Our Peoples] (in Russian). Moskva: Tsentrpoligraf. ISBN 5-9524-0718-8.
- Sobol, Elżbieta, ed. (1995). Słownik wyrazów obcych [Loanword dictionary] (in Polish). Wydawnictwo Naukowe PWN. ISBN 978-8-3011-1837-2.
- Spysz, Anna; Turek, Marta (2014). The Essential Guide to Being Polish. Williamstown, Massachusetts: New Europe Books. ISBN 978-0-9850623-1-6.
- Strybel, Robert; Strybel, Maria (2005) [1993]. Polish Heritage Cookery. New York: Hippocrene Books. ISBN 0-7818-1124-4.
- Strybel, Robert (2007) [2003]. Polish Holiday Cookery. New York: Hippocrene Books. ISBN 978-0-7818-0994-8.
- Szymanderska, Hanna (2010). Kuchnia polska: Potrawy regionalne [Polish Cuisine: Regional Dishes] (in Polish). Warszawa: Świat Książki. ISBN 978-83-7799-631-7.
