= Nesselrode pudding =

Chestnut-based frozen dessert

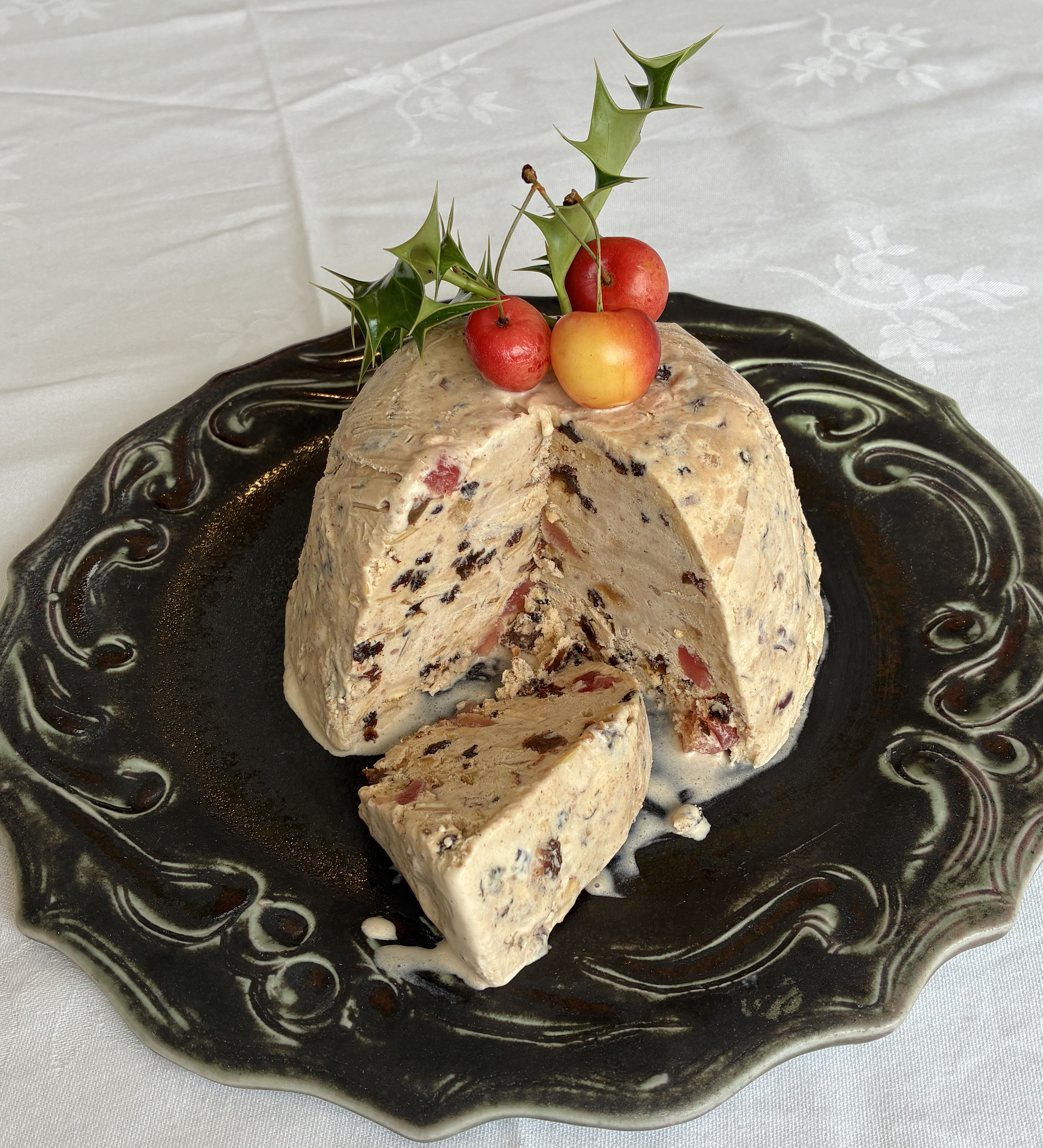
- Nesselrode pudding topped with fresh cherries and holly
- Type: Bombe glacée
- Course: Dessert
- Created by: Chef Mony or Antonin Carême (disputed)
- Main ingredients: Chestnut puree, cream, dried fruit, alcohol
- Similar dishes: Nesselrode pie, Nesselrode consommé, sweetbreads Nesselrode, venison steaks Nesselrode

Nesselrode pudding is a French chestnut-based frozen dessert invented in the first half of the 19th century and named after Russian diplomat Karl Nesselrode. The dish spawned a number of variations, including an American pie; other chestnut-flavored dishes also received Nesselrode's name, not only desserts but also savory dishes such as consommé and sweetbreads.

== Origin ==
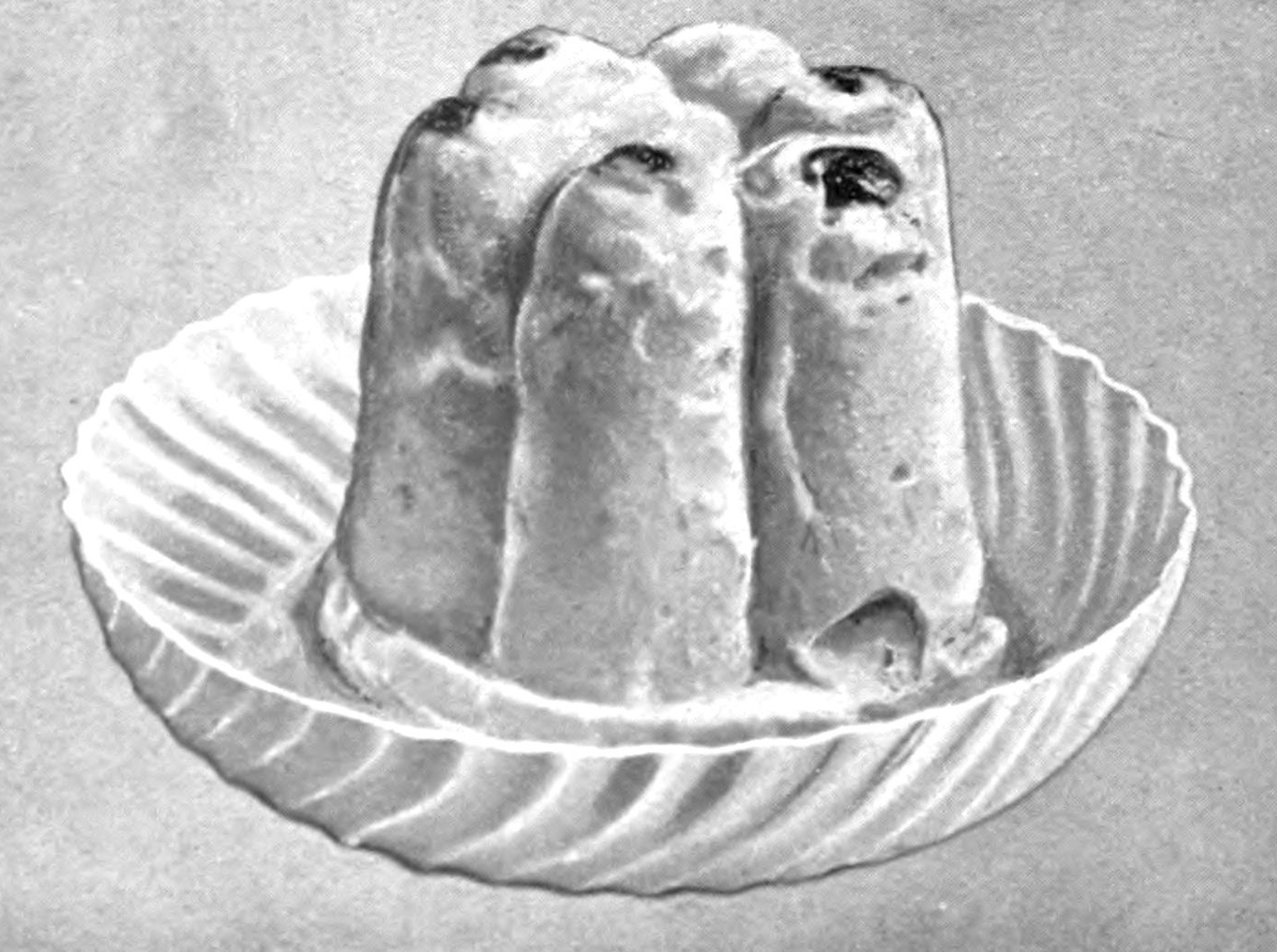
Nesselrode pudding from the 1907 edition of Mrs. Beeton's Book of Household Management by Isabella Beeton

The invention of Nesselrode pudding is disputed. Several sources attribute the invention to Chef Mony (or Muny, Munie, Monni or Mouy), who is claimed to have made the pudding before 1840 while working for the Russian diplomat Karl Nesselrode. Author Patricia Bunning Stephens dates the invention by Mony to the Congress of Vienna in 1814–15. According to Jane Grigson, Mony passed the recipe to Jules Gouffé, who published it in his 1867 book Livres de Cuisine and attributed it to Mony. Author Ian Kelly also attributes the invention to Mony.

However, cookbook writer Gail Monaghan attributes the creation of the pudding to Antonin Carême, chef to French diplomat Charles Talleyrand, also involved in Congress of Vienna. Carême himself wrote in 1828 that his friend Mony derived the idea from a pudding recipe Carême had already published in an earlier edition of one of his cookbooks.

== Preparation and consumption ==
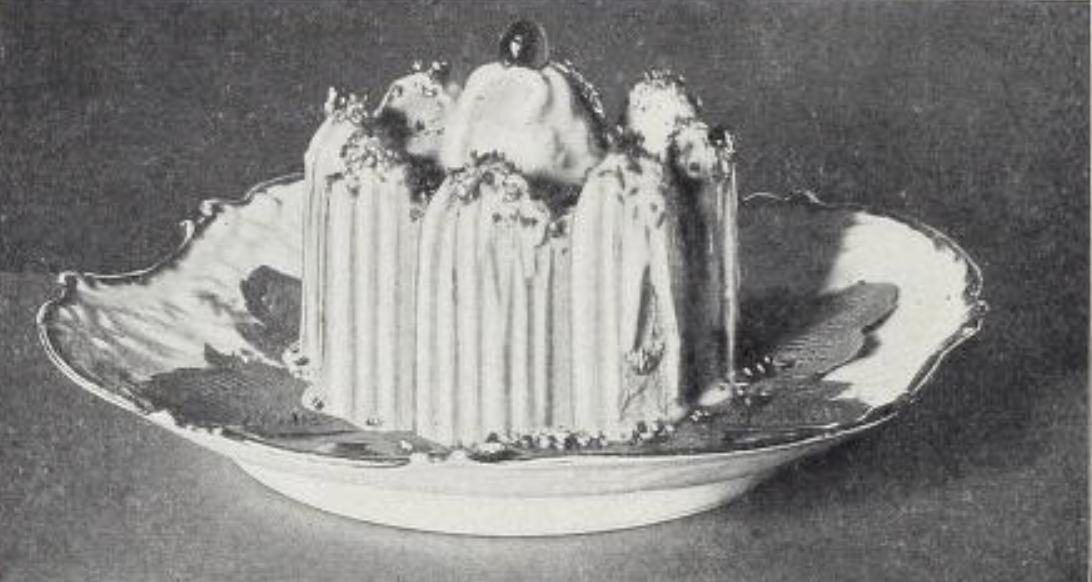
Nesselrode pudding from The Boston Cooking School magazine, 1905

The dessert is generally agreed to contain pureed chestnuts, mixed with cream or egg custard, flavoured with dried fruit, including currants, raisins and dried cherries, candied peel and brandy or other spirits. While it was generally presented as a frozen dessert, in some recipes it was set with gelatin instead. An 1897 recipe published in The Boston Cooking-School Cook Book by American writer Fannie Farmer was a pineapple–chestnut ice cream with candied fruit and raisins, served with maraschino syrup.

== Variations ==
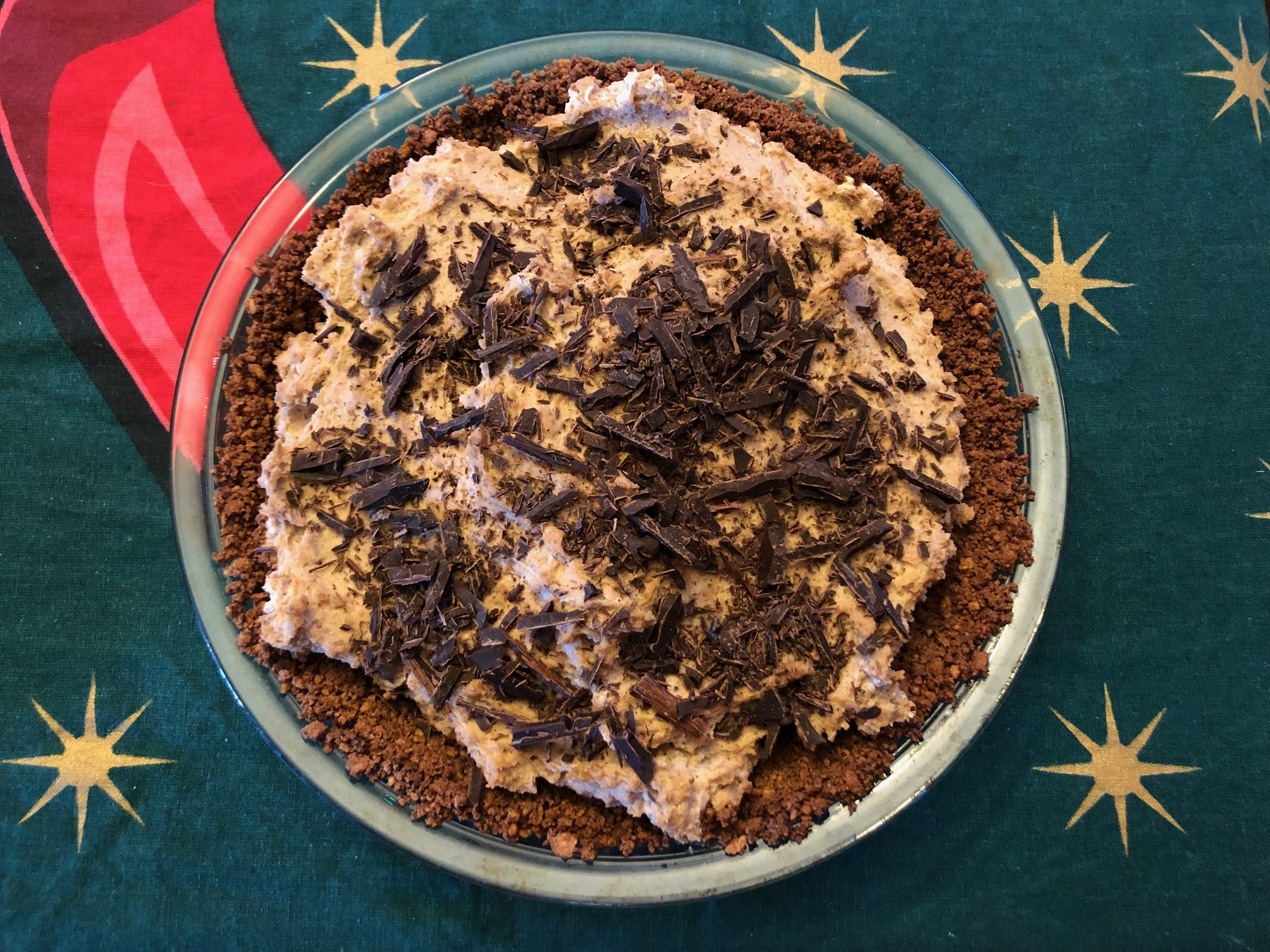
Nesselrode pie

The dessert was popular in Victorian times. English writers Eliza Acton and Isabella Beeton published recipes for Nesselrode pudding, Nesselrode cream and iced Nesselrode.

In the 1950s, the pudding was adapted into Nesselrode pie or Nesselrode chiffon pie, in America. Some recipes for this pie omitted chestnuts (and chestnut flavouring) entirely, relying on cherries, rum and sherry for flavour. Other dishes with the name Nesselrode include sweetbreads Nesselrode, venison steaks Nesselrode, and consommé Nesselrode, the common feature to all being that they are flavoured with chestnuts.

== In culture ==
Nesselrode pudding is served at a dinner party in Proust's Remembrance of Things Past. According to P Segal, it is "one of the few dishes served at Proust's interminable dinner parties in Remembrance to merit an exclamation of approval from a guest", with that approval being: "Ah, what's this now? What, another Nesselrode pudding! After such a feast of Lucullus, it will behove me to take the waters at Karlsbad!"

Novelist Susie Boyt, eating Nesselrode pudding for the first time in 2016, reported that "it tasted of Christmas, without any of the disappointment".
