= Trémeau =

Trémeau may refer to:

- Alphonse Trémeau de Rochebrune (1836–1912), French biologist
- Paul Tremo (1734–1810), German-Polish chef
