= Tadeusz Marek =

Tadeusz Marek may refer to:

- Tadeusz Marek, pen name of Tadeusz Żakiej (1915–1994), Polish musicologist
- Tadeusz "Tadek" Marek (1908–1982), Polish-British engineer
