= Paul Tremo =

Polish royal chef, c. 1733–1810

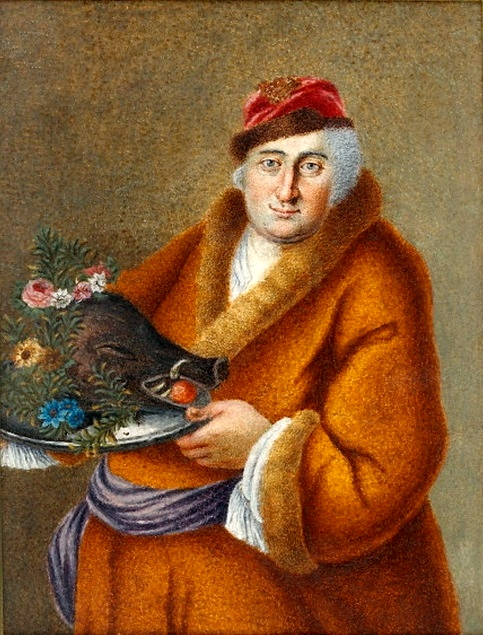
- Portrait of a man carrying a boar's head, painted between 1760 and 1775. Art historian Aneta Biały has suggested his identification as Paul Tremo.
- Born: 1 April 1733 or 1734 (Note: Wojtyńska (1996) gives the date of Paul Tremo's birth as 1 April 1734 (p. 50) and states that he died in 1810 at the age of 76 (p. 51), but notes that, according to Edmund Diehl, Tremo was 77 when he died (p. 55, note 12). Dumanowski (2008) gives Tremo's vital years as 1733–1810 without specifying the dates.); Berlin, Kingdom of Prussia (now in Germany)
- Died: 1810 (aged 76 or 77); Warsaw, Duchy of Warsaw (now in Poland)
- Other names: Tremeau, Tremon, Tremont
- Occupation: Chef

Paul Tremo (c. 1733–1810) was the head chef at the court of King Stanislaus Augustus Poniatowski of Poland. He was born in Berlin, in a family of French Huguenots. As the king's favourite cook, he was responsible for the culinary side of royal banquets, including Thursday Dinners to which Stanislaus Augustus invited Warsaw's leading intellectuals. He followed the king to Saint Petersburg after the latter's abdication in 1795, but returned to Warsaw after his death in 1798. His cooking style combined Polish, French and other west European influences. As a mentor to aspirant Polish chefs and author of recipes which circulated in handwritten copies, he was instrumental in the development of modern Polish cuisine that was more moderate and cosmopolitan than old Polish cookery.

== Life ==
Paul Tremo was born on 1 April 1733 or 1734 in Berlin as the middle son of Elie Tremeau and his wife, Louise Dinant. Elie's father, of the same name, was a Huguenot from the French province of Poitou, who at the turn of the 18th century fled religious persecution in France following the Edict of Fontainebleau and settled in Berlin, encouraged by the Edict of Potsdam. Both Paul Tremo's father and grandfather worked in cotton processing, but two of Elie Junior's sons – the eldest Jacques (1729–1788) and Paul – chose to pursue their careers as cooks. Their family name is variously noted in Berlin church records as Tremeau, Treinau or Tremon, but Jacques and Paul Polonized its spelling to Tremo upon their migration to the Polish–Lithuanian Commonwealth.

In 1762, Paul Tremo landed a job as a court chef to Stanisław Poniatowski, a Polish aristocrat and titular grand pantler of Lithuania. Two years later, in 1764, Poniatowski was elected and crowned king of Poland, taking the regnal name Stanislaus Augustus. Paul Tremo and his brother, Jacques, were employed at the royal court in Warsaw, with their jobs titles variously listed in court payrolls as maître d'hôtel or kuchmistrz (master chef). Of all chefs working at the court, it was Paul Tremo who enjoyed the status of the king's favourite cook, accompanying him in all his travels. This status can be inferred from his salary compared with those of his colleagues; in 1795, he received a payment of 902.15 florins, while two other royal master chefs earned 560 and 144 florins, respectively.

Tremo lived in apartments at the Royal Castle of Warsaw and in the Royal Baths Park. Additionally, in 1789, as a token of royal favour, Tremo was given a manor house in the Warsaw suburb of Grzybów (now the part of Warsaw in the vicinity of Grzybowski Square). While Jacques Tremo was married with at least one daughter and two sons, both of whom served in Polish military formations, Paul Tremo remained single and childless. At home, he employed a female cook who prepared simple meals for him, as he never consumed the dishes he concocted at work.

Following Stanislaus Augustus's abdication brought about by the Third Partition of Poland in 1795, Tremo accompanied the former king to his exile in Grodno and then in Saint Petersburg. After Poniatowski's death in 1798, Tremo declined a job offer from Emperor Paul I of Russia on the pretext of travelling to a spa for health reasons and returned to Warsaw. He died in 1810 in his Grzybów manor and was buried at an unknown location in the cemetery of the Evangelical Reformed (Calvinist) Church in Warsaw.

== Work ==
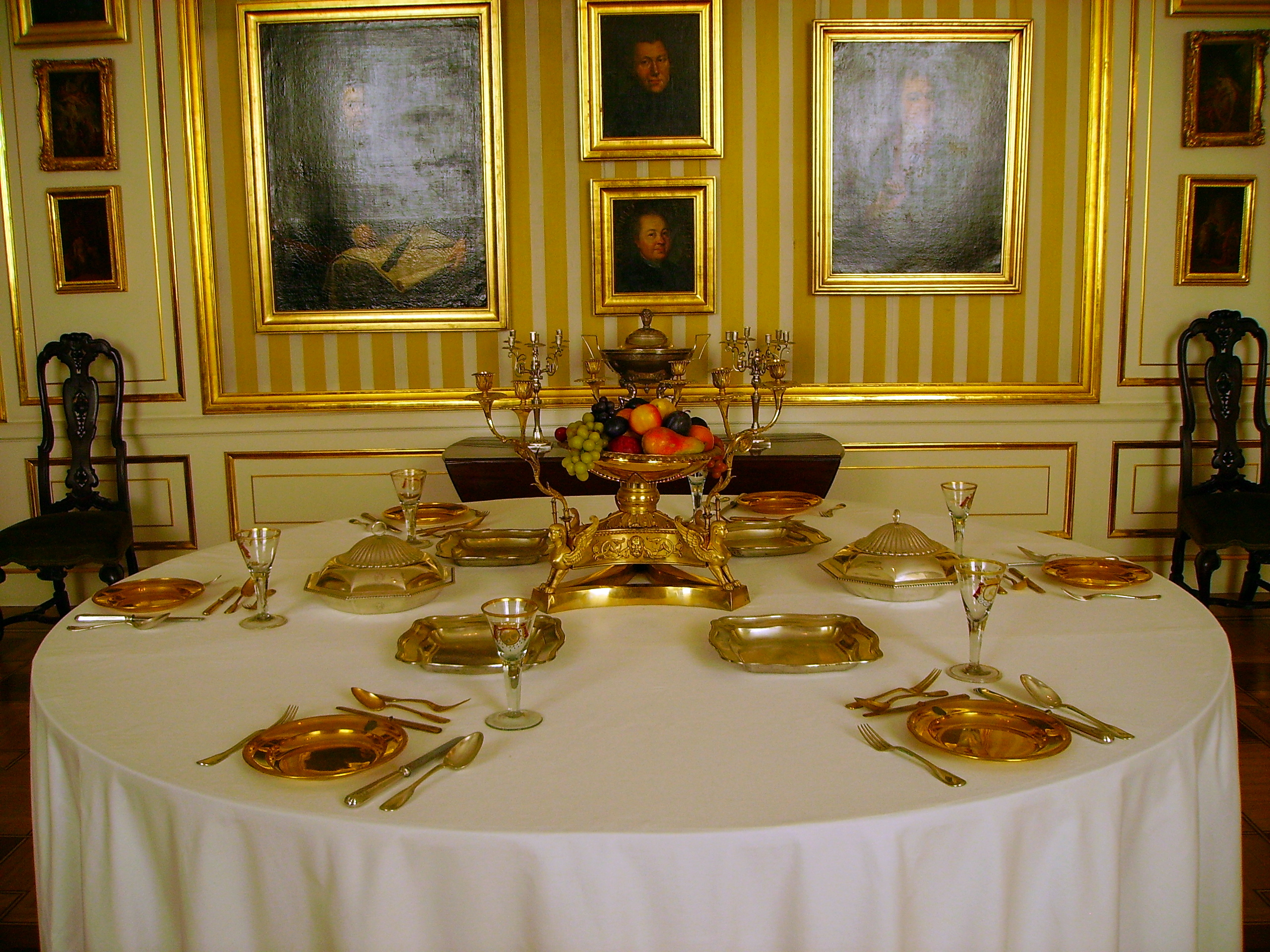
A dining table, set with turn-of-the-19th-century silverware, in the Yellow Room of the Royal Castle of Warsaw, where Thursday Dinners were held during the reign of Stanislaus Augustus

Tremo gained Poniatowski's trust as the cook able to satisfy both his palate and his dietary requirements. The teetotal king suffered from gastric ailments from an early age. He usually started his day with a cup of hot chocolate or bouillon. His favourite dish was roast or stewed mutton, which he washed down with spring water. Tremo often consulted royal menus with the court physician and occasionally prepared separate dishes specifically for the king to accommodate his sensitive stomach. Tomatoes, for example, were considered detrimental to the monarch's health and were never used in Tremo's recipes.

In the royal kitchen, Tremo oversaw all stages of meal preparation, from procuring ingredients to composing menus, directing the work of cooks and kitchen boys, to personally seasoning the dishes before serving. To broaden his culinary knowledge, he studied classic cookbooks, such as the ancient Roman Apicius, and also set out on international learning trips, which familiarized him with contemporary German, French and English cooking practices. He introduced novel French flavours and cooking techniques to Polish cuisine, making it lighter and more moderate in the use of fat, sugar, vinegar, salt and expensive exotic spices. His repertoire combined old Polish dishes with French specialities. The former included clear borscht (beetroot soup) served over uszka (ear-shaped stuffed dumplings), Polish tripe soup, roast capon, and pike in the Polish style; the latter, soupe bourgeoise, roast duck, and bœuf à la mode. At royal banquets, such as the Thursday Dinners to which Stanislaus Augustus invited Warsaw's leading intellectuals, he served the king's favourite mutton, cold cuts, pâtés, as well as game bird dishes, such as larded hazel grouse, wood grouse with red cabbage or black grouse with braised beetroots.

In Warsaw, Tremo enjoyed the reputation of being one of the finest chefs in Europe. However, some of his contemporaries complained that his meats were too tough, his sauces too heavy, and his idea of west European culinary trends not always up-to-date. British traveller Elizabeth Craven could not conceal her amusement when, at a banquet given by the Polish king, she was served meat and fish doused generously with melted butter, supposedly in the English style. German-Polish traveller Georg Forster was surprised when a peasant boy whom he had given Tremo's almond cake, did not enjoy the treat.

Tremo wrote at least two books in Polish, which he failed to publish during his lifetime. His Botanika kuchenna (Kitchen Botany), about the culinary uses of various vegetables, fruits and herbs, has not survived. The other was a cookbook with about 86 recipes, which was widely circulated in manuscript copies, at least two of which have been preserved. One of them, which bears a long, Baroque title translating as The exact study of the methods of cooking and preparing dishes of meat, fish, vegetables, flour, as well as seasoning of various sauces, making punch essence, etc., (Note: In Polish: Nauka dokładna sposobów warzenia i sporządzania potraw z mięsiwa, ryb, jarzyny, mąki, jako też przyprawiania rozmaitych sosów, robienia esencji ponczowej, etc.) contains the author's humorous motto, "not everyone thinks, but everyone eats." (Note: In Polish: Nie każdy myśli, ale każdy jada.) Both copies were published in 1991 in two independent editions.

He also influenced the development of modern Polish cuisine by helping raise the next generation of Polish chefs, many of whom worked with him as apprentices. Tremo's and his brother's signatures can be found on a master craftsman's diploma issued in Warsaw in 1783. One of Tremo's apprentices was Jan Szyttler, who went on to become a prolific food writer, best known for his Kuchnia myśliwska (Hunter's Cuisine); published in 1845, it is the first Polish cookbook devoted solely to game dishes.

== Publications ==
Tremo's cookbook has been published posthumously in two independent editions, based on two surviving manuscript copies, in the following volumes:

- Dębska, Danuta; Dębski, Henryk (1991). Kuchnia królewska [Royal cuisine] (in Polish). Wrocław: Condor. ISBN 8385071105.
- Kowecki, Jerzy, ed. (1991). Kuchnia na sześć osób podług przepisu JP Tremona, pierwszego kuchmistrza Stanisława Augusta króla Polskiego [Cooking for six according to recipes by the Hon. Lord Tremo, first master chef to King Stanislaus Augustus of Poland] (in Polish). Prefaced by Marek Kwiatkowski. Warszawa.

== Sources ==
- Dumanowski, Jarosław (2008). "Kuchmistrz króla Stasia" [Master chef to King Stanislaus]. Silva Rerum (in Polish). Muzeum Pałacu Króla Jana III w Wilanowie.
- Gołębiowski, Łukasz (1830). Domy i dwory [Homes and manors] (in Polish). Warszawa: N. Glücksberg.
- "King's Apartment". The Royal Castle in Warsaw – Museum.
- Lemnis, Maria; Vitry, Henryk (1979). W staropolskiej kuchni i przy polskim stole [Old Polish Traditions in the Kitchen and at the Table] (in Polish). Warszawa: Interpress.
- Łozińska, Maja; Łoziński, Jan (2013). Historia polskiego smaku: kuchnia, stół, obyczaje [History of Polish taste: Kitchen, table, customs] (in Polish). Warszawa: Wydawnictwo Naukowe PWN. ISBN 978-83-7705-269-3.
- Strybel, Robert; Strybel, Maria (2005) [1993]. Polish Heritage Cookery. New York: Hippocrene Books. ISBN 0-78181124-4.
- Wiercińska, Iza. "Starszy mężczyzna niosący głowiznę..." [Elderly man carrying head meat]. Muzeum Narodowe w Warszawie (in Polish).
- Wojtyńska, Wanda (1996). "Paul Tremo – kucharz Stanisława Augusta" [Paul Tremo – the cook to Stanislaus Augustus]. Kronika Zamkowa (in Polish). 33. Warszawa: Arx Regia: 50–56. ISSN 0239-4898.
