= Kopytka =

Potato dumpling in Polish, Belarusian, and Lithuanian cuisines

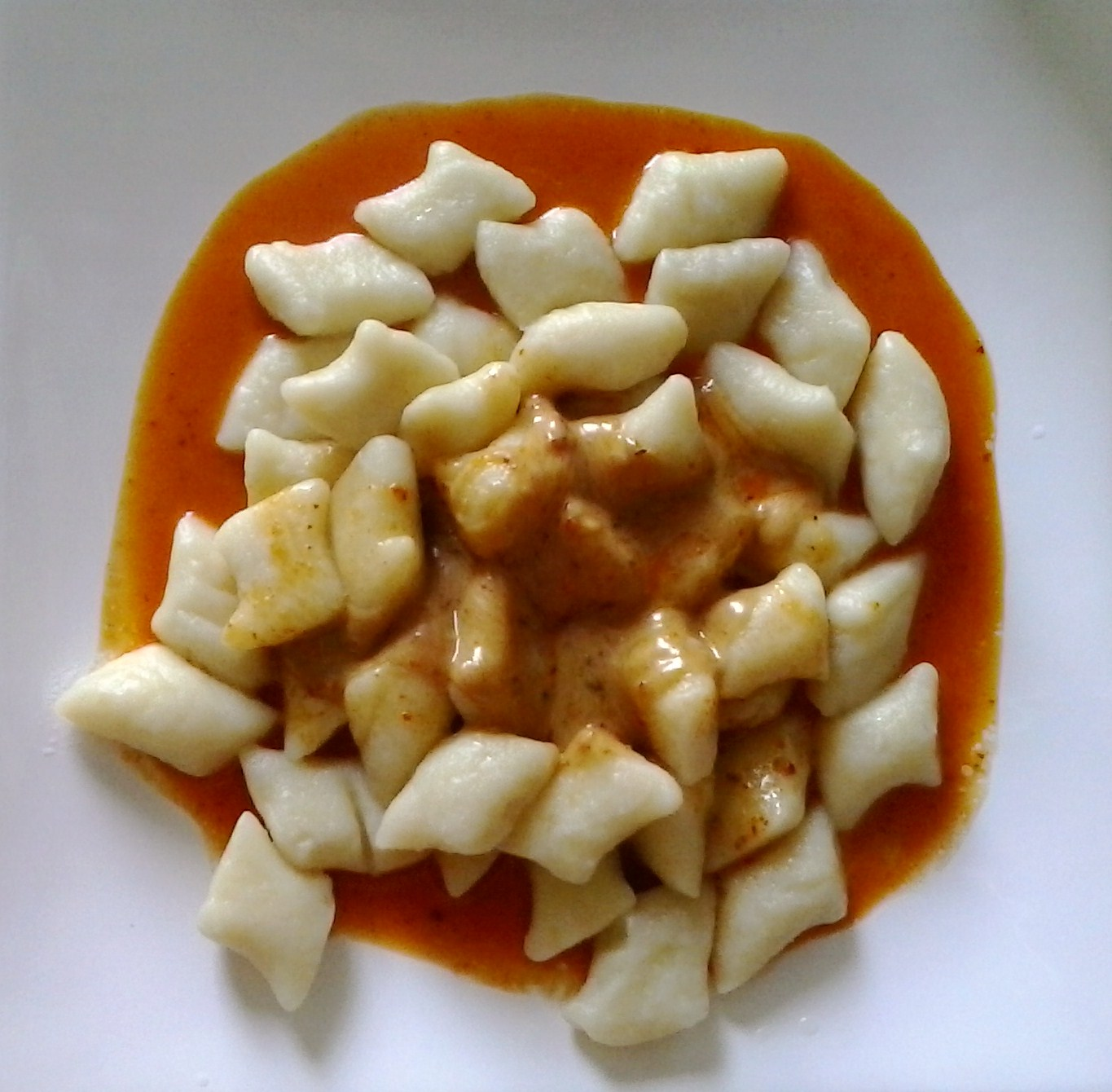
- Kopytka in tomato sauce
- Alternative names: Kapytki (Belarus, Lithuania), Szagówki (Poznań dialect)
- Type: Dumpling
- Place of origin: Poland
- Region or state: Poland, Belarus, Lithuania
- Main ingredients: Potatoes, flour, cheese, fried bacon or onion

Kopytka or kopitka (literally "little hooves") are a kind of potato dumpling in Polish, Belarusian, and Lithuanian cuisines.

== Preparation and serving ==
The typical ingredients are boiled potatoes and flour, but may also include eggs, salt, and other seasoning. The Polish dish is usually cooked in salted water, whereas in Belarusian and Lithuanian cuisines kapytki is baked first, then stewed or boiled in water.

Kopytka can be either a main dish or served on the side. Kopytka can be served savoury (baked with cheese, fried bacon, fried onion, or with a variety of sauces such as goulash or mushroom sauce); they can also be served sweet (with melted butter and sugar, cinnamon, or sweetened quark), or sugar with sour cream.

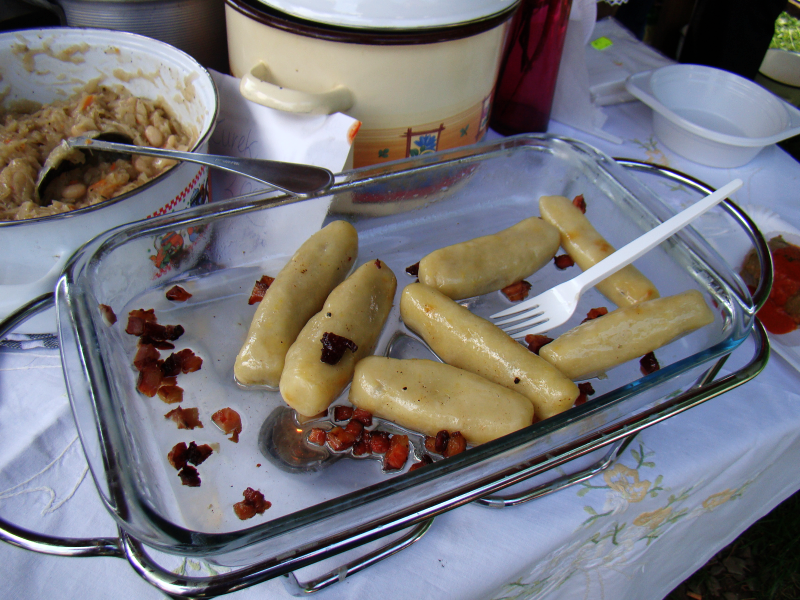
Kluski with fried bacon (in Galicia, Poland)

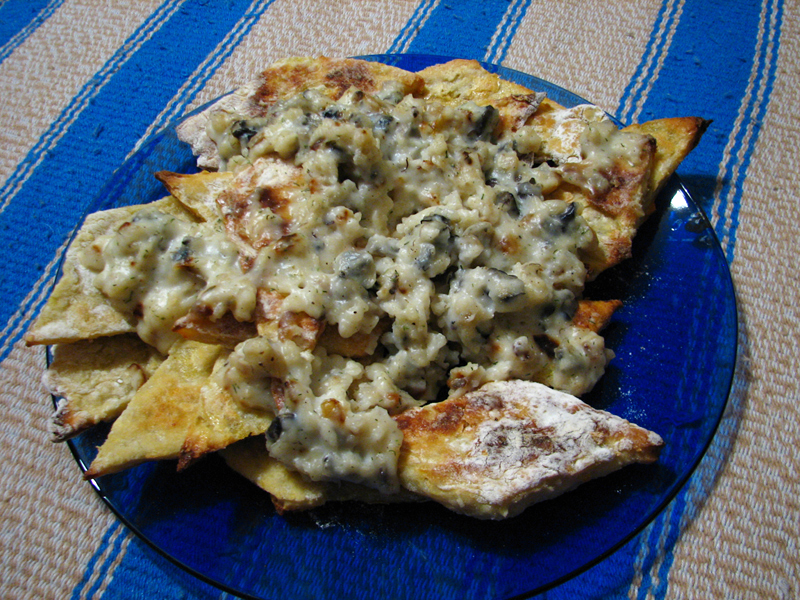
Lithuanian kapytki in a mushroom sauce (Lithuanian: švilpikai)

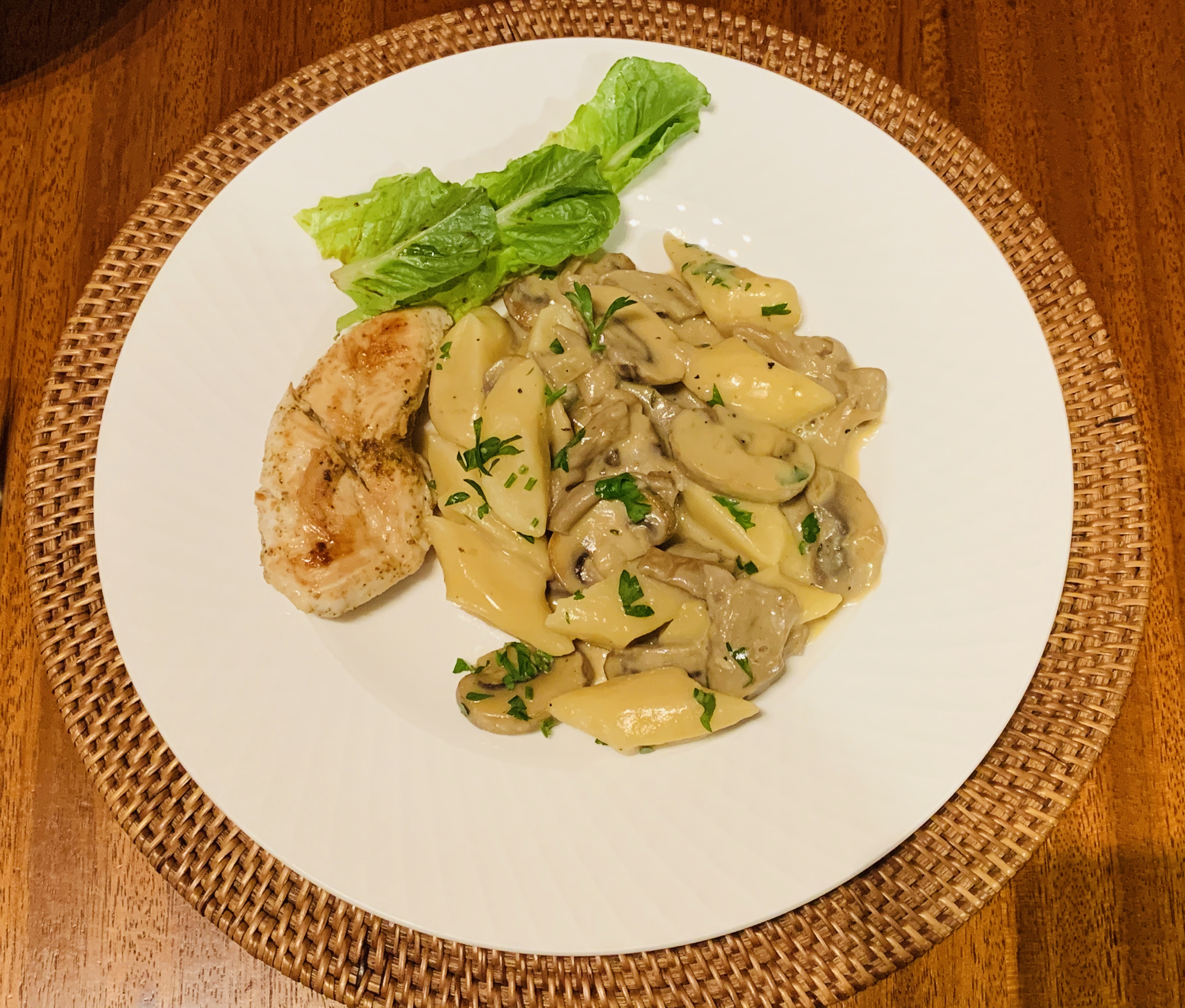
Kopytka in creamy mushroom sauce

== Etymology ==
The word kopytka [kopyto "hoof", kopytko "little hoof", neuter singular nouns] is Polish for "little hooves," such as those of a small hoofed animal (for example, a goat). Kapytki is the Belarusian word for the same concept. Both refer to the structure of these dumplings, which are formed in the shape of hooves.
