= List of French consommés =

In French cuisine there are very many variants of consommé, including those in the list below.

== French consommés ==
| French | English | Contents | Ref |
|---|---|---|---|
| Abatis, aux | With giblets | Chicken consommé with giblets and diced root vegetables. | |
| Adéle | Adele | Chicken consommé with peas, pearls of carrots and chicken quenelles. | |
| Adelina Patti | Adelina Patti | Chicken consommé with peas, pearls of carrots and cubes of royale, (Note: a royale, also known as a règence, is a French garnish: a quenelle made of chicken, game, vegetables or fish according to the main content of the dish it accompanies.) with chestnut purée. | |
| Africaine, à l' | African | Beef consommé with rice, diced artichoke hearts, and small puffs of cream puff paste seasoned with curry powder. | |
| Ailerons | Wings | Chicken consommé, garnished with fowls' wings, boned, stuffed and braised. | |
| Albion 1 | Albion 1 | Fish consommé slightly thickened with tapioca, garnished with lobster quenelles and strips of truffle. | |
| Albion 2 | Albion 2 | Chicken consommé garnished with shredded truffles, asparagus tips, chicken and goose liver quenelles and cockscombs. | |
| Alexandra | Alexandra | Chicken consommé slightly thickened with tapioca, garnished with shredded lettuce, chicken quenelles and strips of white chicken meat. | |
| Allemande | German style | Consommé thickened with tapioca flavoured with juniper, garnished with julienne of red cabbage, roundels of Frankfurter sausages with grated horseradish. | |
| Alsacienne | Alsace style | Consommé garnished with noodles and profiteroles stuffed with foie gras purée. | |
| Ambassadeurs | Ambassador | Chicken consommé with dice of royale, chopped truffles, mushrooms and chicken breast. | |
| Ambassadrice | Ambassadress | Chicken consommé with chopped black truffle, tomato, green peas, julienne of chicken and mushrooms. | |
| Americaine, à l' | American style | Clear chicken broth with rice, crushed peeled tomatoes and cubes of chicken meat. | |
| Amiral, à l' | Admiral style | Fish consommé with fish quenelles, diced lobster, mushrooms and rice. | |
| Ancienne, à l' | Old fashioned | Beef consommé, garnished with dry slices of French bread coated with the vegetables used for the soup, mashed and sprinkled with grated cheese, gratinated in the tureen in which the soup is served. | |
| Andalouse | Andalusia style | Consommé blended with diced royale, tomato purée, garnished with dice of tomato, julienne of ham, boiled rice and vermicelli, with strands of egg. | |
| Anjou | Anjou | Game consommé garnished with asparagus tips, rice and game quenelles. | |
| Arenberg | Arenberg | Chicken consommé, garnished with balls of carrots, turnips, truffles, peas, small round chicken quenelles, and roundels of asparagus chicken. | |
| Arlequin, à l' | Harlequin | Beef consommé garnished with vermicelli and quenelles in three colours: yellow, green and red. | |
| Artagnan | Artagnan | Beef consommé strongly flavoured with essence of grouse, garnished with strips of grouse meat and peas. | |
| Aulagnier | Aulagnier | Beef consommé garnished with peas and strips of cabbage. | |
| Aurore, à l' | Aurora | Beef consommé flavoured with tomato juice, slightly thickened with tapioca, garnished with strips of white chicken meat. | |
| Baigneuse, à la | With stuffed lettuce | Beef consommé garnished with small balls of stuffed lettuce. | |
| Balmoral | Balmoral | Clear mock turtle soup garnished with diced calf's foot and veal quenelles. | |
| Baron Brisse | Baron Brisse | Beef consommé garnished with rice and cubes of royale in three colours: cream, spinach and truffle. | |
| Béatrice | Beatrice | Consommé garnished with semolina, roundels of minced chicken blended with tomato. | |
| Béhague | Béhague | Chicken consommé with poached egg and chervil. | |
| Belle fermière, à la | Farmer's wife style | Rich beef consommé garnished with strips of cabbage, diced green beans and small squares of cooked noodles. | |
| Belle Gabrielle | Beautiful Gabrielle | Consommé thickened with tapioca garnished with rectangles of chicken, mousseline and crayfish tails. | |
| Bénévent | Bénévent | Beef consommé flavoured with tomato, garnished with strips of ox tongue, ox palate and cooked macaroni. | |
| Berchoux | Berchoux | Game consommé, garnished with cubes of quail and chestnut royale, diced mushrooms and truffles. | |
| Bergère, à la | Shepherdess style | Beef consommé thickened with tapioca, garnished with asparagus tips, diced mushrooms, tarragon and chervil. | |
| Berny | Berny | Beef consommé thickened with tapioca, garnished with pommes dauphine, mixed with chopped almonds and truffles shaped into small balls and fried. | |
| Bismarck | Bismarck | Strong beef consommé slightly thickened with arrow root, flavoured with Port, garnished with diced mushrooms and Cheddar cheese. | |
| Blanc-Manger | White food | Chicken consommé garnished with green peas and shredded chervil, served with small tartlets filled with minced chicken. | |
| Bohémienne | Bohemian | Chicken consommé thickened with tapioca and garnished with dice of chicken blended with foie gras purée; profiteroles served separately. | |
| Boieldieu | Boieldieu | Chicken consommé garnished with small foie gras quenelles, chicken quenelles and truffle quenelles. | |
| Bonaparte | Bonaparte | Chicken consommé garnished with chicken quenelles. | |
| Bonne femme, à la | Housewife style | Beef consommé garnished with diced potatoes cooked in stock, strips of leek and carrots, with croûtons. | |
| Bouchère, à la | Butchers | Strong beef consommé garnished with small braised balls of cabbage and blanched beef marrow. | |
| Bouquetière, à la | Flower girl style | Beef consommé garnished with peas, diced French beans, asparagus tips and balls or small cubes of carrots and turnips. | |
| Bourbon | Bourbon | Consommé thickened with tapioca, garnished with sago and large quenelles decorated with truffles representing fleurs-de-lis, with shredded chervil. | |
| Bourdalou | Bourdalou | Chicken consommé garnished with four different kinds of royale tomato, green asparagus, chicken and carrots. | |
| Braganza | Braganza | Beef consommé garnished with nizam pearls (a kind of sago), very small pearls of cucumber and royale in four colours. | |
| Brésilienne, à la | Brasilian | Beef consommé garnished with vegetable julienne, strips of pimiento and rice | |
| Bretonne | Breton | Beef consommé garnished with julienne of leek, celery, onion, mushrooms and shredded chervil. | |
| Briand | Briand | Chicken consommé garnished with dices of chicken, ham and veal and shredded chervil. | |
| Brieux | Brieux | Chicken consommé thickened with tapioca, garnished with chicken made with pistachio powder and cut into stars dice of truffles and japon perles. | |
| Brighton | Brighton | Beef consommé flavoured with sherry, garnished with veal quenelles, strips of cooked calf's head and julienne of vegetables. | |
| Brillat Savarin | Brillat Savarin | Chicken consommé flavoured with celery, slightly thickened with arrowroot, garnished with strips of truffles, mushrooms and carrots. | |
| Britannia | Britannia | Chicken consommé garnished with foie gras quenelles, asparagus tips, strips of truffles and tomato royale cut in triangular shapes. | |
| British | British | Fish consommé garnished with neatly cut strips of truffles and cubes of lobster royale. | |
| Brunoise | Brunoise | Rich beef consommé garnished with braised finely diced carrots, leeks, turnips, celery, onions and French beans peas and chervil. | |
| Camerani | Camerani | Beef consommé garnished with braised diced carrots, celery and leeks with cooked broken spaghetti; grated Parmesan cheese is served separately. | |
| Camino | Camino | Unsweetened pancake dough mixed with grated Parmesan cheese strained through, à colander into boiling beef consommé. | |
| Cancalaise | Cancalaise | Fish consommé thickened with tapioca, garnished with oysters, julienne of fillets of sole, quenelles of whiting. | |
| Capucine, à la| | Capuchins | Chicken consommé garnished with shredded lettuce and spinach; profiteroles filled with chicken purée served separately. | |
| Cardinal | Cardinal | Fish consommé flavoured with lobster, garnished with lobster quenelles. | |
| Carême | Carême | Rich chicken and veal consommé garnished with round slices of carrots and turnips, shredded lettuce and asparagus tips. | |
| Carlton | Carlton | Rich beef consommé garnished with cubes of cream royale, quenelles and small crisp puffs of grated cheese. | |
| Carmélite | Carmelite | Fish consommé slightly thickened with arrowroot, garnished with cubes of fish forcemeat and rice. | |
| Carmen | Carmen | Consommé clarified with tomato purée and sweet red peppers, garnished with chicken | |
| Caroline | Caroline | Chicken consommé garnished with lozenges of chicken, rice and chervil. | |
| Castellane | Castellane | Game consommé flavoured with woodcock, garnished with roundels of a creamed mixture of woodcock purée and lentil purée, yolk of eggs chopped and thickened, served with a julienne of woodcock fillets. | |
| Catalane, à la | Catalonian | Beef consommé garnished with rice, diced poached tomatoes and strips of green peppers. | |
| Cauchoise, à la | Caux style | Beef consommé garnished with slices of braised vegetables and diced cooked bacon and lamb. | |
| Cavour | Cavour | Chicken consommé garnished with green peas, cooked broken macaroni and baked "peas" (unsweetened pancake mixture strained through, a coarse colander into hot fat and fried). | |
| Céleri au | With celery | Beef consommé flavoured with celery. | |
| Celestine | Celestine | Beef or chicken consommé garnished with strips or thin unsweetened pancakes mixed with chopped chervil. | |
| Cendrillon | Cinderella | Chicken consommé with truffles, chicken kidneys and rice. | |
| Chancelière, à la | Chancellor's | Beef consommé garnished with round slices of pea royale, strips of white chicken meat, truffles and mushrooms. | |
| Charivari | Charivari | Beef consommé garnished with strips of braised carrots, turnips, celeriac, onions and cabbage. | |
| Charley | Charley | Beef consommé thickened with tapioca, garnished with asparagus tips, poached eggs and shredded chervil. | |
| Charolaise 1 | Charolais | Petite marmite consommé, garnished with small glazed onions, carrot balls, roundels of braised cabbages and small sections of oxtail. | |
| Charolaise 2 | Charolais | Clear oxtail soup garnished with small braised onions, pearls of carrots, small pieces of oxtail and very small stuffed cabbage leaves shaped into balls. | |
| Chartreuse, à la | Charterhouse | Beef consommé slightly thickened with tapioca, garnished with poached diced tomatoes and small raviolis, stuffed with spinach purée, goose liver and with mushrooms mixed with chicken forcemeat. | |
| Chasseur | Hunter style | Game consommé flavoured with Port, garnished with julienne of mushrooms and game quenelles served with profiteroles stuffed with game purée. | |
| Chatelaine 1 | Chatelaine | Chicken consommé thickened with tapioca, garnished with royale of onion and artichoke purée cut in cubes, and chicken quenelles stuffed with chestnut purée with cheese croûtons. | |
| Chatelaine 2 | Chatelaine | Chicken consommé garnished with slices of chicken royale and semolina royale and short strips of white chicken meat and truffles. | |
| Cherbourg | Cherbourg | Beef consommé flavoured with Madeira wine, garnished with strips of truffles and mushrooms, ham quenelles and poached eggs. | |
| Cheveux d'Anges | Angel hair | Chicken consommé garnished with very small vermicelli. (separately) grated Parmesan. | |
| Chevreuse | Chevreuse | Chicken consommé garnished with large quenelle of chicken, stuffed with asparagus purée and julienne of truffles. | |
| Choiseul | Choiseul | Beef consommé garnished with fancy cut cream royale and asparagus tips. | |
| Christoph Colomb | Christopher Columbus | Chicken consommé flavoured with tomatoes, slightly thickened with tapioca, garnished with cubes of tomato royale and chicken quenelles. | |
| Cincinnati | Cincinnati | Chicken consommé garnished with pearls of carrots, turnips, potatoes and profiteroles stuffed with chicken purée. | |
| Claremont | Claremont | Beef consommé garnished with fried onion rings and round slices of cream royale. | |
| Cléopâtre | Cleopatra | Chicken consommé garnished with diced tomatoes. | |
| Clothilde | Clothilde | Beef consommé garnished with button onions cooked in broth. | |
| Colbert | Colbert | Beef consommé garnished with printanier of vegetables and small poached eggs. | |
| Colombine | Colombine | Chicken consommé garnished with pearls of carrots and turnips, strips of pigeon meat and poached pigeons eggs. | |
| Comtesse | Countess | Chicken consommé thickened with tapioca, garnished with asparagus royale, chicken quenelles decorated with truffles to imitate, a countess's coronet and shredded lettuce. | |
| Crécy | Crécy | Chicken consommé thickened with tapioca garnished with lozenges of chicken, blended with purée of carrots, brunoise of carrots and chervil shreds. | |
| Croute au pot | Crust in the pot | Rich beef consommé garnished with neatly cut vegetables cooked in the soup and diced beef; shortly before serving, crusts of toasted French bread placed on top; usually served in earthenware or fire proof china pot. | |
| Croûte-au-pot, à l'ancienne | Old fashioned soup | Beef consommé garnished with cubes of chicken and beef cooked with the broth, diced pot vegetables, served with slices of fried French bread with poached beef marrow. | |
| Cussy | Cussy | Game consommé flavoured with partridges garnished with roundels of chicken made with chestnut purée and partridges quenelles, julienne of truffles, half-glass of Madeira and brandy when about to serve. | |
| Cyrano | Cyrano | Duck consommé; quenelles of duck forcemeat half, à teaspoonful size, cooked, covered with supreme sauce, sprinkled with cheese and gratinated in the oven, are served extra. | |
| Dame Blanche | White lady | Chicken consommé thickened with tapioca, garnished with dice of chicken made with almond milk, stars of chicken and japon perles. | |
| Danoise, à la | Danish | With strips of truffles and ox tongue and quenelles coloured with saffron. | |
| D'Aremberg | Aremberg beef broth | Beef consommé with peas, pearls of carrots, turnips and truffles, chervil. | |
| D'Assas | Assas Style | Chicken consommé garnished with very small balls of stuffed lettuce and carrot royale cut in cubes. | |
| Daudet | Daudet | Chicken consommé garnished with cubes of chicken and ham royale, lobster quenelles and strips of celeriac. | |
| Daumont | Daumont | Beef consommé thickened with tapioca, garnished with rice, strips of beef palate and mushrooms. | |
| Delavergne | Delavergne | Chicken consommé garnished with cubes of royale, asparagus tips and very small soft boiled eggs. | |
| Delice de dames | Ladies' delight | Rich chicken consommé flavoured with celery, garnished with thin strips of celery, hard-boiled egg whites and diced tomatoes, served slightly jellied. | |
| Delriche | Delriche | Chicken consommé garnished with vermicelli, blanched slices of beef marrow and croûtons. | |
| Demidoff | Demidov | Chicken consommé garnished with printanier of vegetables, truffles, quenelles with fine herbs and chervil shreds. | |
| Deslignac | Deslignac | Chicken or beef consommé thickened with tapioca, garnished with dice of ros-ale, roundels of stuffed lettuces and chervil shreds. | |
| Diablotins, aux | Imp style | Chicken consommé with devilled cheese croûtons sprinkled with cayenne pepper. | |
| Diane, à la | Diana | Partridge consommé garnished with game quenelles, truffle slices cut in half moon shapes, flavoured with sherry or Madeira. | |
| Dijonnaise, à la | Dijon style | Chicken consommé thickened with tapioca, garnished with game quenelles and strips of ox tongue. | |
| Diplomate | Diplomat | Chicken consommé thickened with tapioca and garnished with roundels of chicken forcemeat blended with crayfish butter, julienne of truffles. | |
| Diva | Diva | Chicken consommé garnished with large chicken quenelles decorated with truffles and cubes of lobster royale. | |
| Divette | Divette | Chicken consommé garnished with round slices of crayfish royale, fish quenelles and truffle pearls. | |
| Dolores | Dolores | Chicken consommé garnished with strips of white chicken meat and saffron rice. | |
| Dom Miguel | Dom Miguel | Game consommé garnished with game quenelles and cubes of cream royale. | |
| Dominicaine | Dominican | Consommé with Italian pasta and fresh peas, thickened with egg yolks or vegetable purée or chicken velouté. Served with grated cheese. | |
| Don Carlos | Don Carlos | Beef consommé garnished with cubes of royale, diced poached tomatoes, rice and shredded chervil. | |
| Doria | Doria | Chicken consommé garnished with printanier and cucumber, large macaroni, filled with tomatoed chicken forcemeat, poached and cut into short lengths; profiteroles. | |
| D'Orsay, à la | D'Orsay | Chicken consommé garnished with poached yolks, pigeon quenelles, strips of pigeon meat and chervil. | |
| Douglas | Douglas | Chicken consommé garnished with diced artichoke hearts, asparagus tips and cubes of braised sweetbread. | |
| Dounou | Dounou | Chicken consommé flavoured with turtle herbs, thickened with tapioca, garnished with chicken quenelles, diced artichoke hearts and truffles; small puff paste patties filled with chicken purée served extra. | |
| Dubarry | Dubarry | Beef consommé slightly thickened with tapioca, garnished with cubes of cauliflower royale and cauliflower buds. | |
| Dubourg | Dubourg | Chicken consommé garnished with rice, cubes of chicken royale and shredded chervil. | |
| Duchesse | Duchess style | Chicken consommé, garnished with perles du japon, dice of royal and julienne of lettuces. | |
| Dufferin | Dufferin | Fish consommé, slightly curried, garnished with curried fish quenelles, rice and strips of sole fillets. | |
| Dumesnil | Dumesnil | Beef consommé garnished with vegetable julienne, sliced blanched beef marrow and shredded chervil. | |
| Dumont | Dumont | Beef consommé garnished with strips of cabbage, ox tongue and mushrooms. | |
| Dupré | Dupré | Chicken consommé garnished with pearls of carrots and turnips, quenelles and croûtons. | |
| Duse | Duse | Chicken consommé garnished with pearl shaped chicken quenelles flavoured with tomato, poached tortelini and fancy shaped noodles. | |
| Ecossaise | Scottish style | Mutton broth garnished with dice of boiled mutton, pearl lanky and large brunoise of vegetables. | |
| Edouard VII | Edward VII | Chicken consommé slightly flavoured with curry, garnished with rice, small puff paste patties filled with chicken purée served extra. | |
| Egyptienne, à l' | Egyptian | Mutton broth flavoured with saffron, garnished with rice, diced aubergines and okra. | |
| Elisabeth | Elisabeth | Beef consommé garnished with strips of leeks, vermicelli and diced artichoke hearts; grated cheese served separately. | |
| Emanuel | Emanuel | Chicken consommé with grated Parmesan cheese, garnished with pieces of spaghetti, strips of chicken meat and cubes of tomato royale. | |
| Ephémères | Ephemera | Chicken consommé garnished with large julienne of carrots, asparagus heads, peas and grated Parmesan, arrowroot, 3 eggs yolks, cream, pepper, nutmeg, garnished with chicken formed into the shape of buttons from a piping bag and poached in consommé. | |
| Épicuriens, des | Epicurean | Chicken consommé garnished with shredded, blanched almonds and shredded chervil. | |
| Escargot, à l' | Snail | Chicken consommé flavoured with snail broth, garnished with small snails, diced root vegetables and fine herbs; croûtons served separately. | |
| Estragon, à l' | With tarragon | Beef consommé flavoured with essence of tarragon, garnished with tarragon leaves. | |
| Faisan | Pheasant | Pheasant consommé garnished with strips of pheasant meat and croûtons. | |
| Fanchonnette | With pancakes | Chicken consommé garnished with small round pieces of pancake stuffed with chicken purée and chopped truffles. | |
| Fausse tortue claire | Mock-turtle, clear | Rich beef consommé flavoured with turtle herbs, celery, mushrooms, Madeira wine and cayenne pepper, garnished with diced calf's head and quenelles. | |
| Fausse tortue, à la souveraine | Mock-turtle sovereign style | Rich beef consommé flavoured with turtle herbs, celery, mushrooms, cayenne pepper and Madeira wine, garnished with chicken quenelles, asparagus tips and diced calf's head. | |
| Favorite | Favourite | Consommé thickened with tapioca, garnished with potato balls, julienne of artichoke hearts and mushrooms, chervil shreds. | |
| Fédéral | Federal | Chicken consommé seasoned with cayenne pepper, garnished with sliced truffles and cubes of plain royale. | |
| Fermière, à la | Farmer style | Beef consommé garnished with strips of root vegetables and diced potatoes. | |
| Filateur, à la | Spinner's | Beef consommé garnished with noodles cut in very thin strips. | |
| Flamande, à la | Flemish | Beef consommé garnished with sprouts royale, peas and shredded chervil. | |
| Fleury | Fleury | Chicken consommé garnished with small, flat round chicken quenelles and peas. | |
| Floréal, à la | Floreal | Chicken consommé garnished with carrots and turnips cut in shape of marguerites, peas, asparagus tips and quenelles with pistachios cut into imitation leaves and chervil. | |
| Florentine, à la | Florence style | Chicken consommé with three sorts of quenelles. | |
| Française, à la | French | Chicken consommé garnished with shredded lettuce, chicken quenelles and chervil. | |
| Francatelli | Francatelli | Chicken consommé garnished with chicken royale, goose liver quenelles, cockscombs and kidneys. | |
| Francfortoise, à la | Frankfurt style | Beef consommé flavoured with juniper berries, strips of red cabbage boiled in beef broth, slices of Frankfurter sausage; grated cheese served separately. | |
| Francillon | Francillon | Ring of chicken forcemeat piped on soup plates,, à very small raw egg placed in the centre, slightly poached in the oven, hot chicken consommé poured over. | |
| Franklin | Franklin | Beef consommé garnished with balls of carrots and turnips, profiteroles and cubes of royale with vegetable purée. | |
| Frou-frou | Frou-frou | Chicken consommé garnished with pearls of carrots, small crisp profiteroles and shredded chervil. | |
| Gabrielle | Gabrielle | Chicken consommé with egg yolks garnished with cubes of chicken royale and diced crayfish tails. | |
| Galloise or gauloise, à la | Gallic style | Chicken consommé garnished with cockscombs and kidneys and ham royale in cubes. | |
| Garibaldi | Garibaldi | Beef consommé with diced poached tomatoes and strips of spaghetti. | |
| Gauloise | Gallic style | Chicken consommé thickened with yolk of eggs garnished with cocks combs and kidneys, and roundels of ham chicken. | |
| Gelée au vin, en | Jellied with wine | Rich chicken consommé flavoured with Madeira, sherry, marsala, malvasier etc. Served slightly jellied. | |
| George Sand | George Sand | Fish consommé garnished with fish quenelles with crayfish butter, cooked diced morels and carps soft roes on small fried croûtons served separately. | |
| Germaine | Germaine | Chicken consommé garnished with chicken quenelles, cubes of pea royale and chervil. | |
| Germinal | Germinal | Consommé flavoured with tarragon, garnished with peas, diced French beans, asparagus tips, quenelles of tarragon and chervil, with giblets. | |
| Girondine | Gironde style | Consommé garnished with lozenges of chicken and chopped ham, julienne of carrots. | |
| Gourmet | Gourmet | Chicken consommé garnished with diced game meat. Goose liver and ox tongue, small round slices of poached chicken forcemeat and shredded pistachios. | |
| Grande Duchesse | Grand Duchess | Chicken consommé garnished with chicken quenelles, julienne of chicken supreme, tongue, and asparagus tips. | |
| Grenade | Grenade | Beef consommé garnished with ham royale cut grenade shape, diced poached tomatoes and chervil. | |
| Grimaldi | Grimaldi | Consommé clarified with fresh tomato purée, garnished with dice of chicken and julienne of celery. | |
| Gutenberg | Gutenberg | Beef consommé garnished with asparagus tips, peas, diced mushrooms and braised root vegetables with slices of Frankfurter sausage. | |
| Hodge-Podge | Hodge-podge | Mutton broth garnished with pearl barley, peas, brunoise of vegetables and dice of cooked mutton. | |
| Hongroise | Hungarian style | Consommé flavoured with tomato and paprika, garnished with roundels of chicken forcemeat and quenelles of calf's liver. | |
| Huîtres, aux | With oysters | Oysters poached in white wine, diced, mixed with fish forcemeat, seasoned, stuffed in small rounds of noodle dough, poached and served in strong fish consommé. | |
| Impératrice (A) | Empress | Chickcn consommé garnished with cocks' combs and kidneys, asparagus heads and roundels of chicken. | |
| Impératrice (B) | Empress style | Chicken consommé garnished with roundels of chicken forcemeat made in the shape of a black pudding and inserted with French beans, sticks of truffles and carrots. | |
| Imperial | Imperial | Chicken consommé slightly thickened with tapioca. Garnished with small round slices of poached chicken forcemeat, slices of cockscombs and kidneys, small bright green peas and chervil. | |
| Indienne, à l' | Indian | Chicken consommé flavoured with curry powder, garnished with cubes of coconut royale and rice. | |
| Infante (A) | Infanta | Chicken consommé thickened with tapioca, garnished with grooms coated with vegetable purée and gratinéed. | |
| Infante (B) | Infanta | Same as above with profiteroles stuffed with foie gras and served separately. | |
| Irlandaise, à l' | Irish | Duck consommé garnished with duck quenelles, braised diced root vegetables and strips of cabbage cooked in broth. | |
| Irma | Irma | Beef consommé garnished with curried quenelles and strips of mushrooms. | |
| Isabella | Isabella | Chicken consomme ganished with quenelles of creamed chicken, garden peas and julienne of truffle. | |
| Isoline | Isoline | Chicken consommé garnished with chicken quenelles stuffed with asparagus purée, strips of mushrooms, chicken meat and truffles. | |
| Italienne, à l' | Italian | Beef consommé garnished with cubes of spinach and tomato royale, and macaroni cooked in broth and cut in very small pieces; grated Parmesan cheese served separately. | |
| Jacobine | Jacobin | Beef consommé garnished with diced carrots, green beans, trunips, truffles and peas. | |
| Jacqueline | Jacqueline | Chicken consommé garnished with braised, fancy cut carrots. Pastilles of cream royale, peas, asparagus tips, rice and chervil. | |
| Jambon, à l'andalouse | Andalusian ham broth | Beef broth strongly flavoured with ham, garnished with rice and cubes of royale with tomato purée. | |
| Jenny Lind | Jenny Lind | Game consommé flavoured with quails, garnished with quail breasts and diced mushrooms. | |
| Jockey Club | Jockey Club | Chicken consommé garnished with rounds of carrots and pea and chicken royale. | |
| Johore | Johore | Chicken consommé flavoured with curry, garnished with strips of chicken meat, rice and curried royale. | |
| Joinville | Joinville | Chicken consommé garnished with quenelles of three different flavours and colours, green, red and white. | |
| Jouvencelle | Jouvencelle | Consommé thickened with tapioca, garnished with stuffed lettuce leaves rolled cigarette shape and poached separately) round croûtons coated with carrot purée sprinkled with cheese and set to gratin. | |
| Juanita | Juanita | Chicken consommé garnished with cubes of cream of rice royale, diced poached tomatoes and sieved hard egg yolks. | |
| Judic | Judic | Rich chicken consommé garnished with truffle rings, rosette shaped chicken quenelles and very small braised lettuces, usually served separately. | |
| Julia | Julia | Chicken consommé thickened with tapioca, garnished with cubes of royale and small crisp profiteroles. Julienne. | |
| Julienne | Julienne | Beef consommé garnished with root vegetables cut in small strips and braised, peas and chervil. | |
| Juliette | Juliette | Chicken consommé garnished with small round chicken quenelles, cubes of spinach royale and strips of hard-boiled egg whites. | |
| Kléber | Kléber | Beef consommé garnished with peas, diced celeriac, goose liver quenelles and chervil. | |
| Labourdane | Labourdane | Duck consommé garnished with cauliflower buds, cubes of pea royale, royale with duck purée and shredded chervil. | |
| Lady Morgan | Lady Morgan | Fish consommé flavoured with oysters, garnished with crayfish quenelles, strips of truffles, mushrooms, fillets of sole and bearded oysters. | |
| Laffite | Laffite | Chicken consommé flavoured with Madeira wine, garnished with strips of cockscombs and kidneys, mushrooms and truffles, cucumber pearls and small pitted olives. | |
| Lagrandiere | Lagrandiere | Chicken consommé garnished with strips of chicken meat and crisp profiteroles filled with purée of artichoke hearts. | |
| Laguipierre | Laguipierre | Game consommé garnished with game royale and poached pigeons eggs. | |
| Laitues, aux | With lettuce | Beef consommé garnished with shredded lettuce. | |
| Leo XIII | Leo XIII | Beef and veal consommé garnished with royale cut in papal tiara and cross shapes. | |
| Léopold | Leopold | Consommé with semolina and garnished with shreds of lettuce, sorrel and chervil | |
| Lesseps | Lesseps | Beef consommé garnished with cubes of calf's brain royale and chervil.with lettuce. | |
| Lilloise, à la | Lille style | Rich beef consommé flavoured with tarragon and chervil, garnished with strips of truffles, mushrooms and roasted almonds. | |
| Londonderry | Londonderry | Beef consommé thickened with tapioca, garnished with quenelles and cubes of calf's head, flavoured with Madeira wine. | |
| Londonienne, à la | London style | Rich beef consommé flavoured with turtle herbs garnished with cubes of calf's head and rice. | |
| Longchamps | Longchamps | Beef consommé garnished with fine noodles, strips of sorrel and shredded chervil. | |
| Lord Chesterfield | Lord Chesterfield | Rich beef consommé flavoured with turtle herbs, cayenne pepper and sherry wine, garnished with chicken, crayfish and truffle quenelles. | |
| Lorette | Lorette | Chicken consommé spiced with paprika, garnished with asparagus tips, strips of truffles, chervil; small balls of lorette potatoes served separately. | |
| Lucullus | Lucullus | Beef consommé garnished with cauliflower buds, pearls of carrots and turnips, and three different sorts of quenelles, red, white and yellow. | |
| Macaroni, au | With macaroni | Beef consommé garnished with macaroni cut in small pieces, grated Parmesan cheese served separately. | |
| Macdonald | Macdonald | Consommé, garnished with roundels of chicken made with brain purée, dice of cucumber and small raviolis. | |
| Macédoine | With macedoine | Beef consommé garnished with diced, braised vegetables. | |
| Madeleine, à la | Magdalena | Chicken consommé garnished with cubes of celery, shredded lettuce, almond shaped chicken quenelles; crisp profiteroles served separately. | |
| Madrilène, à la | Madrid style | Rich chicken consommé coloured with very ripe, unpeeled tomato. If served hot it is accompanied by cheese straws lightly sprinkled with paprika; may also be served cold and slightly jellied in hot weather. | |
| Madrilène en gelée | Jellied madrilène | Madrid consommé with additional strength, lightly jellied when cold. | |
| Magenta | Magenta | Chicken consommé thickened with arrowroot, garnished with truffle quenelles, strips of mushrooms, truffles and diced tomatoes. | |
| Mancelle | Mancelle | Game consommé garnished with very small poached chestnuts and cubes of game royale. | |
| Margot | Margot | Chicken consommé garnished with two sorts of quenelles: chicken and chicken mixed with spinach purée. | |
| Marguerite | Marguerite | Chicken consommé, garnished with marguerites made with chicken forcemeat, poached and cut into thin roundels and stamped with fancy cutter to the shape of marguerite yolk of egg in the middle in imitation of the flower centre asparagus heads. | |
| Maria | Maria | Chicken consommé thickened with tapioca, garnished with roundels of chicken made with bean purée and printanier of vegetables. | |
| Marie Louise | Marie Louise | Chicken consommé garnished with cubes of plain royale and peas. | |
| Marie Stuart | Mary Stuart | Beef consommé garnished with chicken quenelles decorated with truffles, thickened with tapioca. | |
| Marigny | Marigny | Chicken consommé garnished with chicken quenelles, peas, strips of cucumber and chervil. | |
| Marly | Marly | Chicken consommé garnished with strips of leek, celery, chicken, shredded lettuce, chervil and cheese croûtons. | |
| Marquise (A) | Marchioness style | Consommé with celery flavour, garnished with roundels of veal amourettes and quenelles of chicken mixed with chopped hazelnuts. | |
| Marquise (B) | | Chicken consommé, garnished with tomato chicken quenelles, julienne of lettuce and truffles. | |
| Marquise (C) | Marquise | Beef consommé highly flavoured with celery, garnished with slices of blanched calf's marrow and chicken quenelles mixed with finely chopped hazelnuts. | |
| Martinière | Martinière | Chicken consommé garnished with slices of stuffed, braised cabbage, peas, chervil and square shaped diablotins. | |
| Mécène, à la | Maecenas | Chicken consommé garnished with diced celeriac, game quenelles and chicken royale. | |
| Medicis | Medici | Beef consommé slightly thickened with tapioca, garnished with purée of peas and purée of carrots royale and shredded sorrel. | |
| Mégère | Shrew | Consommé, garnished with gnocchi made with potato, shredded lettuces large vermicelli. | |
| Meissonier | Meissonnier | Beef consommé garnished with diced artichoke hearts and tomatoes, peas and chervil. | |
| Mercédès | Mercedes | Beef consommé flavoured with sherry wine, garnished with rings of pimentoes and stars of cockscombs. | |
| Messaline | Messaline | Chicken consommé flavoured with tomato, garnished with julienne of sweet pimentos, cocks kidneys and rice. | |
| Metternich | Metternich | Pheasant consommé garnished with strips of pheasant meat and cubes of artichoke-heart royale. | |
| Mignon | Mignon | Fish consommé garnished with fish quenelles, truffle pearls and shrimps. | |
| Mikado | Mikado | Chicken consommé strongly flavoured with tomatoes, garnished with diced white chicken meat and tomatoes. | |
| Milanaise, à la | Milanese | Chicken consommé garnished with small pieces of macaroni mixed with béchamel, dipped in bread crumbs and fried; grated Parmesan cheese served separately. | |
| Mimosa (A) | Mimosa | Chicken consommé, garnished with pink, green and yellow chicken (carrots, green peas, hard yolks). | |
| Mimosa (B) | | Chicken consommé, garnished with hard boiled yolk of eggs pressed through a large sieve. | |
| Mireille 1 | Mireille | Chicken consommé with semolina, round slices of chicken forcemeat with tomato purée and cubes of plain royale. | |
| Mireille 2 | Mireille | Chicken consommé garnished with slices of poached chicken forcemeat with purée of tomatoes and saffron rice. | |
| Mirette | Mirette | Petite marmite consommé, garnished with chicken quenelles, shredded lettuce and chervi, served with cheese croûtons. | |
| Moelle, à la | With marrow | Rich beef consommé garnished with slices of blanched beef marrow; fried croûtons served separately. | |
| Mogador | Mogador | Chicken consommé thickened with tapioca, garnished with goose liver royale and white chicken meat, ox tongue and truffles cut in shape of lozenges. | |
| Moldave, à la | Moldavian | Fish consommé with pickled cucumber brine flavoured with Madeira wine, garnished with strips of mushrooms, diced sturgeons' meat and vesiga, and peeled, sliced lemon. | |
| Molière | Molière | Rich beef consommé garnished with small dumplings made of fried bread crumbs, chopped shallots, parsley and eggs; blanched marrow on toast served separately. | |
| Mona Lisa | Mona Lisa | Rich beef consommé garnished with chicken quenelles and peas. | |
| Monaco | Monaco | Chicken consommé, garnished with pea-shaped truffles, carrots, turnips, and profiteroles. | |
| Monselet | Monselet | Beef consommé garnished with strips of ox tongue, slices of poached beef marrow, peas, chervil and fried croûtons. | |
| Monte-Carlo | Monte-Carlo | Chicken consommé garnished with pea-shaped chicken quenelles, shredded lettuce and chervil; hazelnut sized, very crisp profiteroles served separately. | |
| Montesquieu | Montesquieu | Beef consommé garnished with strips of chicken meat, ham and mushrooms and cauliflower buds. | |
| Montmorency | Montmorency | Chicken consommé thickened with tapioca, garnished with asparagus tips, chicken quenelles, rice and chervil. | |
| Montmort | Montmort | Consommé, garnished with roundels of chicken forcemeat, mixed with chopped truffles and tongue, dice of green chicken (pea park) carrots and turnips, crescent shaped, asparagus heads and chervil. | |
| Mosaïque | Moses style | Consommé, garnished with various shapes of chicken and chicken forcemeat of various flavours. | |
| Moscovite | Moscow style | Consommé of stales or sturgeon and cucumber essence, garnished with julienne of salted mushrooms and dice of vesiga poached in consommé. | |
| Moules, aux | With mussels | Strong fish consommé flavoured with mussel juice, garnished with small poached and bearded mussels and fried croûtons. | |
| Mousseline | Mousseline | Chicken consommé, garnished with small chicken mousseline poached in grooved moulds. | |
| Mouton, à la turque | Pilaw soup, turkish styles | Mutton consommé garnished with rice cooked in fat mutton broth. | |
| Murillo 1 | Murillo | Chicken consommé garnished with very thin noodles, diced tomatoes and chervil. | |
| Murillo 2 | Murillo | Fish consommé flavoured with tomato, garnished with fish quenelles. | |
| Nansen | Nansen | Rich beef consommé slightly flavoured with vodka; very small caviar canapes served separately. | |
| Nantaise | Nantes style | Chicken consommé garnished with peas, pearl barley and strips of chicken meat. | |
| Napoléon | Napoleon | Chicken consommé garnished with triangular shaped raviolis stuffed with purée of goose liver. | |
| Napolitaine, à la | Naples style | Beef consommé flavoured with tomato juice, garnished with strips of ham and celeriac, macaroni cut in small pieces and chervil; grated Parmesan cheese served separately. | |
| Navarin | Navarin | Beef consommé garnished with cubes of pea royale, small crayfish tails and chopped, blanched parsley. | |
| Neige de Florence | Snow of Florence | Consommé garnished with special italian paste. | |
| Nelson | Nelson | Fish consommé thickened with arrowroot, garnished with rice separately) serve small bouchées filled with dice of lobster americaine. | |
| Nemours | Nemours | Chicken consommé, thickened with tapioca, garnished with crecy chicken with dice of carrots, perles du japon, julienne of truffles. | |
| Nesselrode | Nesselrode | Game consommé flavoured with grouse, garnished with chestnut royale, strips of grouse and diced mushrooms. | |
| New yorkaise, à la | New York style | Beef consommé garnished with game quenelles, cubes of onion royale and tomato royale and chervil. | |
| Nicoise, à la | Nice style | Chicken consommé garnished with cubes of tomato and green bean royale, diced potatoes and shredded chervil. | |
| Nids d'Hirondelles | Swallow's nest | Chicken consommé, flavoured with herbs and Madeira, garnished with swallow nests, thoroughly cleaned and poached. | |
| Nilson | Nilson | Chicken consommé thickened with tapioca, garnished with three sorts of quenelles chicken and chopped ham, chicken and chopped truffles, chicken and chopped chives, peas and chervil. | |
| Ninon | Ninon | Chicken consommé garnished with pearls of carrots, turnips and truffles; small tartlets of chicken forcemeat stuffed with hashed chicken, decorated with truffle star served separately. | |
| Nivernaise | Nivernaise | Beef consommé garnished with pearls of carrots and turnips, cubes of onion royale and chervil. | |
| Noailles | Noailles | Chicken consommé garnished with strips of ox tongue and chicken, cubes of artichoke bottom royale and chervil. | |
| Nouilles, à l'andalouse | Andalusian noodle soup | Beef consommé flavoured with tomato, garnished with vermicelli and cubes of cooked ham. | |
| Olga | Olga | Consommé with Port wine flavour, garnished with julienne of leeks, celeriac, salted gherkins and carrots. | |
| Orge perlé, à l' | With pearl barley | Beef consommé garnished with pearl barley cooked in broth. | |
| Orientale, à l' | Oriental | Mutton consommé flavoured with tomato juice and saffron, garnished with rice, brain royale cut in shape of half moons and hard-boiled egg yolks strained through, à sieve. | |
| Orléanaise, à l' | Orleans style | Beef consommé garnished with chicory royale, diced French beans, flageolets and chervil. | |
| Orléans | Orléans style | Consommé, thickened with tapioca, garnished with quenelles made in three different colours (white with chicken, red with tomato, green with spinach). | |
| Orsay | Orsay | Chicken consommé, garnished with poached yolk of eggs, quenelles of pigeon, julienne of pigeon breast, asparagus heads. | |
| Ostendaise, à l' | Ostend style | Rich fish consommé flavoured with oyster liquor, garnished with poached bearded oysters. | |
| Palermitaine, à la | Palermo style | Chicken consommé garnished with pieces of spaghetti, cubes of tomato royale and diced chicken meat, grated Parmesan cheese served separately. | |
| Palestine | Palestine | Beef consommé garnished with pearls of carrots and turnips, peas and diced beans. | |
| Palestro | Palestro | Beef consommé garnished with strips of root vegetables, shredded lettuce, rice and cubes of tomato royale. | |
| Parfait | Perfect | Chicken consommé thickened with tapioca, flavoured with Madeira, garnished with cubes of royale. | |
| Parisienne, à la (1) | Paris-style | Chicken consommé garnished with cubes of royale with minced root vegetables, braised, diced vegetables and chervil. | |
| Parisienne, à la (2) | Paris style | Chicken consommé garnished with julienne of potatoes and leeks. | |
| Parmesane | Parmesan | Consommé, garnished with Parmesan biscuits. | |
| Pascale, à la | Easter | Chicken consommé garnished with peas, cubes of carrots and turnips royale, sprinkled with chopped fennel green. | |
| Pâtes d'Italie, aux | With Italian pasta | Beef consommé garnished with small noodles of different shapes. | |
| Pâtes diverses | Various pastas | Consommé, garnished with vermicelli, gina paste, italic alphabet . | |
| Patti | Patti | Chicken consommé thickened with tapioca. Garnished with diced artichoke hearts and truffles. | |
| Paysanne, à la | Rustic style | Beef consommé with braised vegetables cut in small thinslices, served with slices of fried French bread. | |
| Pecheurs, des | Anglers' soup | Strong fish consommé garnished with mussels, peas and diced tomatoes. | |
| Petit-duc | Little duke | Beef consommé thickened with tapioca, garnished with strips of chicken meat, truffles and chervil. | |
| Petite mariée | Bride's | Chicken consommé garnished with purée of chicken royale with almond milk and chervil shreds. | |
| Petite marmite | Small pot | Rich beef consommé garnished with nicely cut pot vegetables and small pieces of boiled beef, usually served in individual earthen soup pots; fried slices of French bread with blanched beef marrow served separately. | |
| Petite marmite béarnaise | Small pot Béarn style | Same as above with the addition of rice and julienne of potatoes. | |
| Petite marmite Kisseleff | Small pot, Kisseleff | Beef broth, not clarified, garnished with diced calf's foot, chicken, turnips, carrots and celeriac, shredded lettuce, cabbage and leeks. | |
| Pétrarque | Petrarch | Beef consommé garnished with shredded leeks, grilled pistachios and diablotins. | |
| Picarde, à la | Picardy style | Beef consommé garnished with shredded leeks and croûtons. | |
| Piémontaise, à la | Piedmont style | Beef consommé flavoured with saffron, garnished with rice, diced ham, piedmont truffles and diced tomatoes; grated cheese served separately. | |
| Pierre le grand | Peter the Great | Beef consommé garnished with strips of celery and turnips, shredded lettuce and tarragon. | |
| Poireaux, aux | With leeks | Beef consommé flavoured with leeks, strips of leek and chervil. | |
| Pois frits, aux | With fried peas | Beef consommé garnished with unsweetened pancake mixture strained through, a colander in hot deep fat and fried. | |
| Poisson, à la russe | Russian fish | Fish consommé garnished with pearls of cucumbers and fish quenelles. | |
| Pojarsky | Pojarsky | Chicken and grouse consommé; small grouse or chicken cutlets served separately. | |
| Polignac 1 | Polignac | Beef consommé garnished with cooked chicken forcemeat with chopped truffles and ox tongue in small round pieces. | |
| Polignac 2 | Polignac | Fish consommé garnished with lobster quenelles and diced mushrooms. | |
| Polonaise, à la | Polish | Chicken consommé garnished with unsweetened pancakes coated with chicken forcemeat, rolled up, cooked and cut in slices. | |
| Pondichéry | Pondicherry | Mutton broth flavoured with curry, garnished with rice and strips of unsweetened pancakes filled with mutton hash. | |
| Portugaise, à la | Portuguese | Rich beef consommé strongly flavoured with tomato juice, spiced with cayenne pepper, served cold in cups. | |
| Potemkin | Potemkin | Rich fish consommé clarified with pounded press caviar and white wine, garnished with asparagus tips and strips of carrot and celery. | |
| Prince de Galles | Prince of Wales | Chicken consommé garnished with asparagus tips and truffled chicken quenelles. | |
| Prince Nicolai | Prince Nicolai | Chicken consommé flavoured with tomato juice and red peppers, garnished with diced red peppers, celery and small crayfish tails. | |
| Princess Alice | Princess Alice | Chicken consommé thickened with tapioca, garnished with shredded lettuce, strips of artichoke hearts and chicken meat. | |
| Princesse, à la | Princess's | Chicken consommé garnished with pearl barley, cubes of pea royale and strips of white chicken meat. | |
| Printanier | Spring | Chicken consommé garnished with pearls or small round strips of braised carrots and turnips, peas, diced French beans, asparagus tips, shredded lettuce and chervil. | |
| Printanier Colbert | Spring with poached eggs | Same as above but with very small poached eggs. | |
| Profiteroles, aux | With profiteroles | Beef consommé served with very small crisp puffs of cream puff paste filled with chicken purée. | |
| Quenelles | Quenelles | Consommé, garnished with quenelles to taste. | |
| Quenelles à la Moelle | Quenelles with marrow | Consommé thickened with tapioca, garnished with quenelles made with marrow. | |
| Quenelles à la Viennoise | Viennese-style quenelles | Same as above with quenelles made with calf's liver and fennel. | |
| Queue de Bœuf | Oxtail | Consommé made with oxtail cut into sections and browned with mirepoix in the oven moisten with stock and clarified in the ordinary manner, garnished with carrots, turnips of the ox-tail a glass of old Madeira when serving. | |
| Rabelais | Rabelais | Game consommé garnished with strips of celery and truffled lark quenelles, flavoured before serving with vouvray wine. | |
| Rachel | Rachel | (separately) croûtons fried in butter and filled with slices of poached marrow garnished with dice of chicken; beef marrow on toast served separately. | |
| Rampolla | Rampolla | Fish consommé flavoured with crayfish and rhenish wine (hock), garnished with strips of eelpout, crayfish tails, oysters and diced mushrooms. | |
| Raphael | Raphael | Beef consommé garnished with cubes of celeriac. | |
| Raspail | Raspail | Rich beef consommé garnished with chicken quenelles and ncnarninim tint. | |
| Raviolis, aux | With ravioli | Consommé garnished with very small ravioli stuffed with spinach or other purée. | |
| Récamier | Recamier | Chicken consommé garnished with sago, truffle balls and chicken quenelles. | |
| Reine, à la | Queen's | Chicken consommé slightly thickened with tapioca, garnished with cubes of chicken royale and strips of white chicken meat. | |
| Réjane | Réjane | Chicken consommé flavoured with chervil, garnished with confetti-shaped carrot royale, filbert and cream royale and raw eggs strained through, à colander into the soup. | |
| Rembrandt | Rembrandt | Chicken consommé garnished with cubes of pea royale and diced white chicken meat. | |
| Remusat | Rémusat | Beef consommé garnished with quenelles mixed with tomato purée, spinach purée, diced root vegetables and chervil. | |
| Renaissance | Renaissance | Chicken consommé, garnished with balls of vegetables and chicken cut into shapes, chervil shreds. | |
| Riche, à la | Rich style | Rich chicken consommé garnished with largetruffled chicken quenelles. | |
| Richelieu | Richelieu | Beef consommégarnished with strips of carrot and turnip, stuffed chicken quenelles and balls of stuffed lettuce. | |
| Richepin | Richepin | Chicken consommé garnished with chicken quenelles stuffed with chicken jelly, strips of carrot. Turnip and stuffed lettuce leaves. | |
| Risi-bisi | Risi-bisi | Beef consommé garnished with rice and green peas; grated Parmesan cheese served separately. | |
| Riso a Fegatini | Rice and liver | Chicken or white consommé when boiling cook rice drop at the last minute small cubes of chicken liver just to be poached (separately) grated Parmesan cheese. | |
| Rivoli | Rivoli | Fish consommé garnished with fish quenelles and small pieces of spaghetti. | |
| Robespierre | Robespierre | Rich beef consommé flavoured with tomato juice, served in cups. | |
| Rohan | Rohan | Game consommé garnished with poached plovers eggs and shredded lettuce, game purée spread on small rounds of toast gratinated and served separately. | |
| Rois, Des | Kings | Chicken consommé with quail flavour, garnished with quail quenelles, quail breasts, asparagus tips and truffle pearls. | |
| Rossini | Rossini | Chicken consommé, thickened with tapioca and flavoured with truffles essence, garnished with profiteroles stuffed with foie gras purée and chopped truffles. | |
| Rothschild | Rothschild | Game consommé, garnished with roundels of chicken made with purée of pheasant, chestnut purée and salmis sauce when about to serve add a glass of sauternes chicken consommé, garnished with cubes of royale, lozenges, etc. | |
| Rotraud | Rotraud | Game consommé flavoured with white wine, garnished with pheasant and chestnut royale and strips of pheasant meat and truffles. | #76/> |
| Royal | Royal | Chicken consommé slightly thickened with tapioca, garnished with cubes of royale. (royale an unsweetened custard of eggs with added egg yolks, broth or cream tomato purée etc. Cut in cubes, round slices, diamonds etc.). | |
| Rubens | Rubens | Chicken consommé flavoured with tomato juice, garnished with hop shoots. | |
| Saint-Hubert | St Hubert | Game consommé with white wine, garnished with chicken of game purée and lentil purée. Julienne of game. | |
| Saint-Saëns | Saint-Saëns | Chicken consommé garnished with pearl barley and potatoes balls. | |
| Salvator | Salvator | Beef consommé flavoured with tomato juice, garnished with diced tomatoes and chervil. | |
| San Remo | San Remo | Chicken consommé garnished with rice and round slices of carrots; grated Parmesan cheese served separately. | |
| Sans-Gêne | Sans-Gêne | Chicken consommé garnished with strips of truffles, cockscombs and cocks' kidneys. | |
| Santa Maria | St Mary | Chicken consommé flavoured with tarragon, garnished with angels hair and quenelles; profiteroles stuffed with mushroom purée served separately. | |
| Santos-Dumont | Santos-Dumont | Chicken consommé thickened with tapioca, garnished with pearls of carrots and turnips and strips of French beans. | |
| Sarah Bernhardt | Sarah Bernhardt | Chicken consommé slightly thickened with tapioca, garnished with chicken quenelles with crayfish butter, sliced beef marrow, asparagus tips and strips of truffles. | |
| Savarin | Savarin | Beef consommé garnished with sweetbread quenelles stuffed with onion purée. | |
| Saxon | Saxon | Beef consommé garnished with strips of ham, ox tongue and sauerkraut cooked in broth and croûtons. | |
| Ségurd | Ségurd | Chicken consommé garnished with strips of chicken meat and smoked ox tongue.with. | |
| Semoule Beatrice | Semolina Beatrice | Beef consommé with semolina, round slices of broiled chicken forcemeat and cubes of tomato royale. | |
| Semoule, au | Semolina | Beef consommé with semolina cooked in the soup. | |
| Severin | Severin | Chicken consommé garnished with small slices of cooked chicken forcemeat. | |
| Sévigné | Sevigne | Chicken consommé garnished with chicken quenelles, braised stuffed lettuce, very green peas and chervil. | |
| Sévillane, à la | Seville style | Beef consommé flavoured with tomato juice, slightly thickened with tapioca, garnished with cubes of tomato royale. | |
| Solange | Solange | Consommé, garnished with pearl barley, squares of lettuce and chicken. | |
| Solferino | Solferino | Beef consommé garnished with pearls of carrots, turnips and potatoes. | |
| Soubise | Soubise | Beef consommé garnished with cubes of onion purée royale. | |
| Soubrette | Maid style | Tomato chicken consommé, seasoned with cayenne pepper garnished with round, flat quenelles decorated in the middle with a roundel of truffle in imitation of a pink shrimp's tail. | |
| Souveraine, à la | Sovereign | Chicken consommé garnished with pearl sized chicken quenelles, peas and braised, diced root vegetables and chervil. | |
| St Charles | St Charles | Beef consommé garnished with small poached eggs and shredded chervil. | |
| St George | St George | Hare consommé flavoured with claret, garnished with hare quenelles, strips of truffles and hare meat. | |
| St Germain | St Germain | Beef consommé garnished with quenelles, peas,shredded lettuce and chervil. | |
| Surprise | Surprise | Chicken consommé flavoured and colored with the juice of red beetroots, garnished with chicken quenelles stuffed with chicken aspic jelly. | |
| Talleyrand | Talleyrand | Chicken consommé flavoured with sherry wine, garnished with diced truffles cooked in sherry. | |
| Talma | Talma | Chicken consommé garnished with rice and almond milk royale. | |
| Tapioca, au | With tapioca | Beef consommé slightly thickened with tapioca. | |
| Tchèque, à la | Czech | Chicken consommé garnished with diced chicken meat, tomatoes, peas and thin strips of unsweetened pancakes. | |
| Tewfik pasha | Tewfik Pasha | Mutton consommé flavoured with tomato and peppers, garnished with rice and strips of red and greenpeppers. | |
| Theodor | Theodor | Chicken consommé garnished with diced chicken meat, asparagus tips and flageolets. | |
| Théodora | Théodora | Chicken consommé garnished with chicken julienne and truffles, garnished with dice of royale and asparagus tips. | |
| Thérèse | Theresa | Cold chicken sonsomme garnished with shredded chervil and filbert-sized balls of chicken mousse. | |
| Tivoli | Tivoli | Chicken consommé with semolina garnished with small baked raviolis. | |
| Tortue au sterlet | Turtle with sturgeon | Clear turtle soup garnished with strips of sturgeon meat cooked in champagne, sturgeon quenelles and slices of eel-pout liver. | |
| Tortue clair | Clear turtle | Made with beef, veal, calve's feet, turtle meat and pot herbs, flavoured with turtle herbs and sherry, garnished with the diced turtle meat. | |
| Tortue Lady Curzon | Turtle Lady Curzon | Clear turtle soup, filled in small cups, covered with curry flavoured whipped cream, glazed rapidely. | |
| Tortue Sir James | Turtle Sir James | Clear turtle soup flavoured with cognac and Madeira, served in small cups. | |
| Tosca | Tosca | Chicken consommé thickened with tapioca, garnished with chicken, goose liver and truffle quenelles and strips of carrots; profiteroles stuffed with chicken purée served separately. | |
| Toscane, à la | Tuscan style | Beef consommé garnished with diced mushrooms and tomatoes, small pieces of macaroni and diced baked aubergines. | |
| Trévise ou Trois Filets | Three fillets | Consommé, garnished with chicken julienne, ox tongue and truffles. | |
| Trianon | Trianon | Chicken consommé thickened with tapioca, garnished with slices of chicken, spinach and carrot royale. | |
| Tsarévitch | Czarevitch | Game consommé flavoured with sherry, garnished with hazelhen quenelles and strips of truffles. | |
| Tunisienne, à la | Tunisian | Mutton consommé flavoured with saffron, garnished with chickpeas, rice, diced tomatoes and green peppers. | |
| Turbigo | Turbigo | Chicken consommé garnished with strips of chicken meat and carrots and vermicelli. | |
| Tzarine | Tsarina | Chicken consommé, flavoured with fennel; garnished with dice of vesiga. | |
| Valencia | Valencia | Beef consommé with semolina, garnished with shredded lettuce, sorrel and chervil. | |
| Valencienne, à la | Valencian | Chicken consommé garnished with chicken quenelles, shredded lettuce and chervil. | |
| Valentino | Valentino | Chicken consommé garnished with strips of chicken meat, truffles and small heart-shaped chicken quenelles. | |
| Valois | Valois | Consommé, garnished with tomato quenelles, pearl barley asparagus heads. | |
| Vatel | Vatel | Fish consommé garnished with diced sole fillets and cubes of lobster royale. | |
| Vaudoise | Vaudoise | Beef consommé with diced beef and root vegetables cooked in the soup; crusts of dried French bread and grated swiss cheese served separately. | |
| Vénitienne, à la | Venice style | Beef consommé flavoured with tarragon, chervil and sweet basil, garnished with rice; very small browned potato dumplings served separately. | |
| Verdi | Verdi | Beef consommé garnished with small pieces of macaroni and spinach, tomato and cream-quenelles. | |
| Vermandoise, à la | With green vegetables | Beef consommé thickened with tapioca, garnished with peas, asparagus tips, diced French beans, shredded lettuce and sorrel. | |
| Vermicelle, au | With vermicelli | Beef consommé garnished with cooked vermicelli. | |
| Véron | Véron | Beef consommé flavoured with truffle juice and port, garnished with strips of red peppers and cubes of purée of flageolet royale. | |
| Vert-pré | Green meadow | Beef consommé thickened with tapioca, garnished with asparagus tips, diced French beans, sorrel and shredded lettuce. | |
| Vesiga, à la russe au | With vesiga | Chicken consommé flavoured with Madeira, garnished with strips of cooked vesiga and three sorts of quenelles. | |
| Victor Emanuel | Victor Emmanuel | Beef consommé garnished with diced tomatoes and macaroni; grated Parmesan cheese served separately. | |
| Victoria | Victoria | Beef or chicken consommé garnished with strips of chicken meat and truffles, chicken quenelles, peas and chervil. | |
| Victoria Regina | Victoria Regina | Fish consommé flavoured with lobster, garnished with asparagus tips and truffle pearls; small puff paste patties filled with lobster ragout served separately. | |
| Viennoise, à la (1) | Viennese | Rich beef consommé not clarified, flavoured with smoked beef, bacon and root vegetables, garnished with rice, pearl barley, very small haricot beans and peas. | |
| Viennoise, à la (2) | | Consommé with pink paprika, garnished with julienne of cheese pancakes and gnocchi, seasoned with paprika. | |
| Villageoise, à la | Village style | Beef consommé garnished with strips of leek and small square shaped noodles.with sago pearls. | |
| Villeneuve | | Chicken consommé, garnished with dice of maple, and lozenges of lettuce coated with chicken forcemeat combined with chopped ham, poached in oven. | |
| Villeroi | Villeroi | Chicken consommé garnished with chicken forcemeat, chopped carrots, onions, and tomatoes added, poached and cut in slices. | |
| Viveur | Viveur | Chicken consommé flavoured and colored with red beetroot garnished with strips of celeriac and diablotins(q. V.). | |
| Viviane | Vivian | Chicken consommé garnished with slices of chicken breast and truffles. | |
| Volaille, à l'Aremberg | Aremberg chicken broth | Chicken consommé garnished with pearls of carrots, turnips and truffles, chicken quenelles, asparagus royale in round slices. | |
| Voltaire | Voltaire | Chicken consommé garnished with diced chicken meat, tomatoes and chicken quenelles. | |
| Westmoreland | Westmorland | Veal and calf's head consommé slightly thickened with arrowroot, flavoured with Madeira, garnished with small slices of gherkins, truffles, chicken quenelles and diced calf's head. | |
| Windsor | Windsor | Rich beef consommé flavoured with turtle herbs and sherry, slightly thickened with arrowroot, garnished with strips of calf's foot. | |
| Xavier | Xavier | Beef consommé flavoured with Madeira, thickened with arrowroot, garnished with thin strips of unsweetened pancake. | |
| Yvette | Yvette | Chicken consommé flavoured with turtle herbs, garnished with chicken quenelles and purée of spinach. | |
| Zingara, à la | Gipsies | Chicken consommé garnished with three different sorts of royale. | |
| Zola | Zola | Beef consommé garnished with small cheese dumplings mixed with chopped white truffles; grated cheese served separately. | |
| Zorilla | Zorilla | Chicken consommé flavoured with tomato juice, garnished with rice and chickpeas. | |

== Notes, references and sources ==
=== Sources ===
- Bickel, Walter (1989). Hering's Dictionary of Classical and Modern Cookery (eleventh ed.). London: Virtue. ISBN 978-3-8057-0307-9.
- Escoffier, Auguste (1965). Ma cuisine. London: Paul Hamlyn. ISBN 0-60-002450-4.
- Saulnier, Louis (1978) [1923]. Le répertoire de la cuisine (fourteenth ed.). London: Jaeggi. OCLC 10867.
