= Gail Monaghan =

American cookbook writer

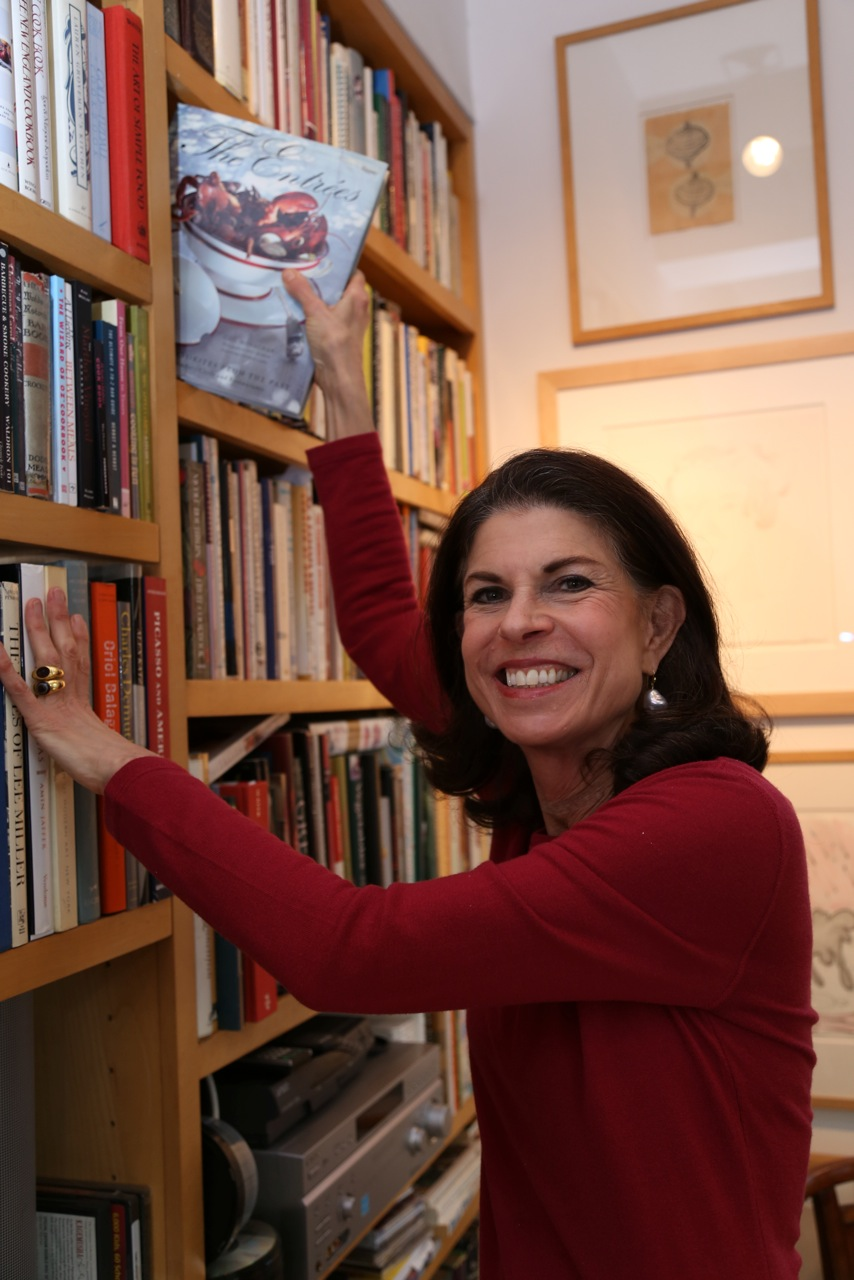
- Author Gail Monaghan with her cookbook The Entrees
- Born: Manhattan, New York
- Education: Wellesley College; Institute of Culinary Education
- Occupations: Author; Food Writer & Columnist; Cooking Teacher

Gail Monaghan is a cookbook author and cooking teacher. She writes for the Wall Street Journal Off Duty section as a feature food columnist and is the host of the Wall Street Journal Digital Network’s Cooking Confidential with Gail Monaghan. She has cooked alongside chefs Mario Batali, Michael Symon, and Carla Hall on ABC's The Chew.

Monaghan is the editor of Lora Zarubin’s James Beard Award-winning cookbook I Am Almost Always Hungry, as well as James Beard Award- winning chef Jeremiah Tower’s Jeremiah Tower Cooks. Her work has been featured in Food and Wine, House and Garden, O, the Oprah Magazine, Food Arts, Martha Stewart Living, and The New York Times.

== Early life and career ==
After some years owning and operating successful design businesses, she turned to food, earning a professional degree from The Institute of Culinary Education in 1991.

In 1992, she established her own gourmet baking business, selling to several New York City eateries including Dean & DeLuca, Felissimo and Petrossian.

She then published her first cookbooks, Perfect Picnics for All Seasons and Some Like It Hot, a cookbook inspired by the movie of the same name. Her more recent works include the highly acclaimed Lost Desserts and The Entrees, which tracked the origins of classic dishes from the past, sweet and savory respectively. Bloomberg's Peter Elliot named Lost Desserts the 'best sweets book of the year.' Publishers Weekly later named "The Entrees" one of the 'best cookbooks of 2010.'

In June 2014, Monaghan revealed to the Huffington Post, that she had been working on her latest cookbook It's All in the Timing, to be published a year or so later by Agate.

== Bibliography ==
- Monaghan, Gail (2010). The Entrees: Remembered Favorites from the Past: Recipes from Legendary Chefs and Restaurants. Rizzoli. ISBN 9780847833924
- Monaghan, Gail (2007). Lost Desserts: Delicious Indulgences of the Past Recipes from Legendary and Famous Chefs. Rizzoli. ISBN 9780847829835
- Monaghan, Gail (1996). The Some Like it Hot Cookbook. Abbeville Press, Inc. ISBN 9780789202444
- Monaghan, Gail (1995). Perfect Picnics For All Seasons. Abbeville Press, Inc. ISBN 9781558598027
