= Tadeusz Żakiej =

Polish musicologist and publicist

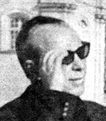
- Born: 13 January 1915; Lemberg, Galicia, Austria-Hungary (now Lviv, Ukraine)
- Died: 6 October 1994 (aged 79); Warsaw, Poland
- Other names: Tadeusz Marek, Maria Lemnis, Henryk Vitry
- Occupations: Musicologist, music publicist, food writer

Tadeusz Żakiej (Polish pronunciation: [taˈdɛ.uʐ ˈʐakʲɛj]; 13 January 1915 – 6 October 1994) was a Polish musicologist and music publicist, as well as a food writer. He used the pen name Tadeusz Marek when writing about music and the double pen name Maria Lemnis and Henryk Vitry for his work on culinary topics.
